= Ukraine and the United Nations =

Ukraine

United Nations membership
- Membership: Full member
- Since: 24 October 1945
- Former name(s): Ukrainian Soviet Socialist Republic (1945–1991)
- UNSC seat: Non-permanent
- Permanent Representative: Andriy Melnyk

Ukraine was one of the founding members of the United Nations when it joined in 1945 as the Ukrainian Soviet Socialist Republic; along with the Byelorussian Soviet Socialist Republic, Ukraine signed the United Nations Charter when it was part of the Soviet Union. After the dissolution of the Soviet Union in 1991, the newly independent Ukraine retained its seat. On 27 February 2022, the United Nations Security Council Resolution 2623 called for the eleventh emergency special session of the United Nations General Assembly on the subject of the Russian invasion of Ukraine.

== Activities in the United Nations ==
From 2016 to 2017, Ukraine served its fourth term as a non-permanent member in the United Nations Security Council in the Eastern European Group, having previously served its terms in 1948–49, 1984–85 and 2000–01. Hennadiy Udovenko was elected the 52nd President of the United Nations General Assembly (for its 1997–1998 session, including Tenth emergency special and Twentieth special sessions).

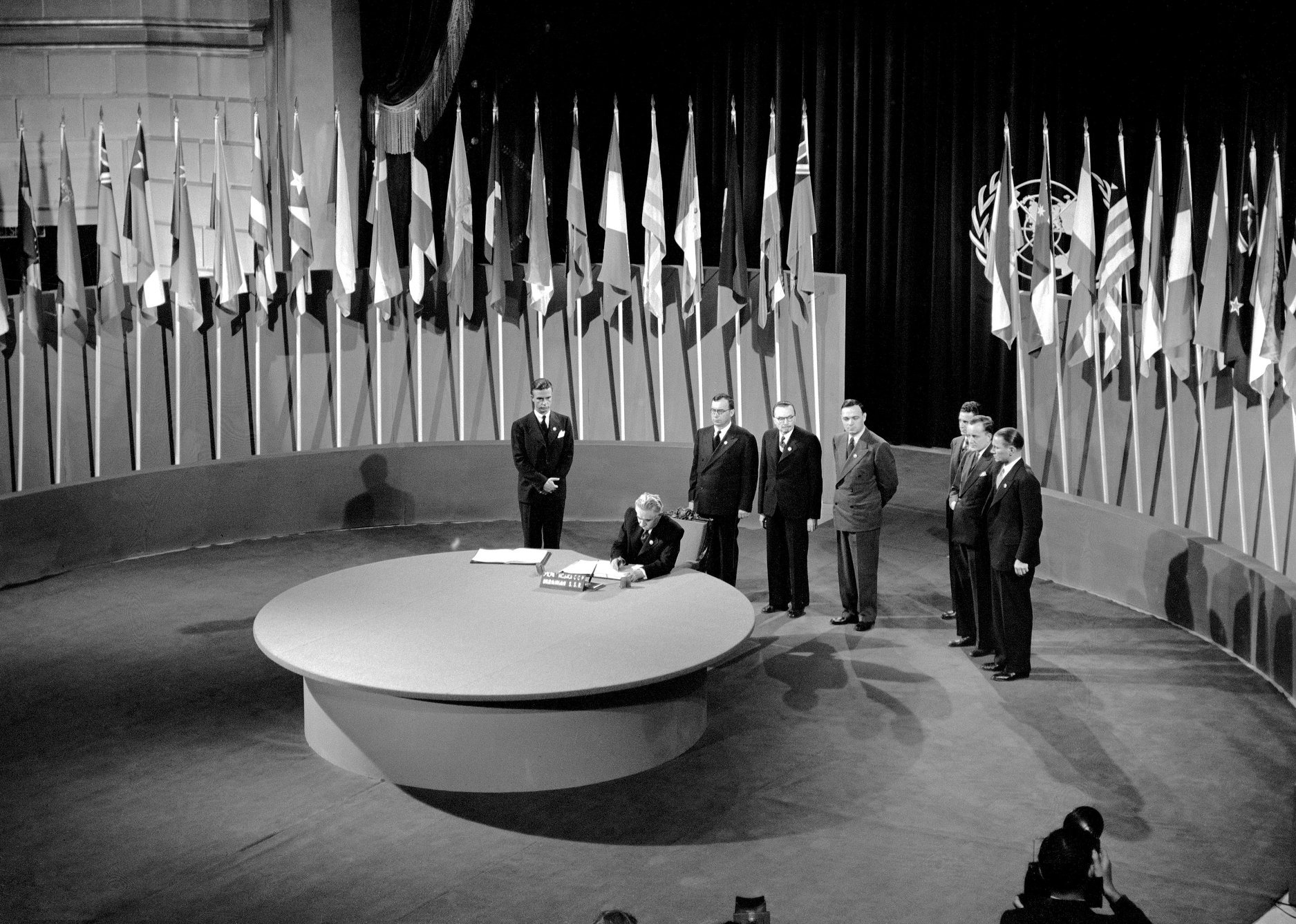
Ukrainian delegation signing of the charter on the establishment of the UN

Following the annexation of Crimea to Russia in 2014, UN member states voted to retain recognition of Crimea as part of Ukraine. At 2022 plenary meeting of the UNGA Eleventh Emergency Special Session the ES-11/4: "Territorial integrity of Ukraine" was adopted in response to five UN member states recognition of DPR and LPR, in addition to two other oblasts, within internationally recognized territory of Ukraine.

== History ==
=== Ukraine in the Soviet Union (1945–1991) ===
Ukrainian Soviet Socialist Republic

United Nations membership
- Membership: Former full member
- Dates: 24 October 1945 – 26 August 1991
- UNSC seat: Non-permanent
- Permanent Representative: Dmitry Manuilsky (1945–52); Anatoliy Baranovsky (1952–54); Luka Palamarchuk (1954–58); Petro Udovychenko (1958–61); Luka Kyzya (1961–64); Sergiy Shevchenko (1964–68); Mykhailo Polyanychko (1968–73); Volodymyr Martynenko (1973–79); Volodymyr Kravets (1979–84); Hennadiy Udovenko (1984–92)

Ukraine signed the Charter of the United Nations as the Ukrainian Soviet Socialist Republic on 26 June, 1945, and it came into force on 24 October, 1945. Ukraine was among the first countries that signed the United Nations Charter, becoming a founding member of the United Nations among 51 countries, being the only Soviet Socialist Republic to do so alongside the Byelorussian SSR. This provided the Soviet Union (a permanent Security Council member with veto powers) with two additional votes in the General Assembly.

Dmitry Manuilsky, head of the Ukrainian delegation at the United Nations Conference on International Organization, held in April–June 1945 in San Francisco, was elected Chairman of the First Committee, which elaborated the Preamble and Chapter 1 (Purposes and Principles) of the United Nations Charter. Until 1958, the permanent mission of Ukraine was led by the Minister of Foreign Affairs rather than the permanent representative.

Another right that was granted but never used until 1991 was the right of the Soviet republics to secede from the union, which was codified in each of the Soviet constitutions. Accordingly, Article 69 of the Constitution of the Ukrainian SSR stated: "The Ukrainian SSR retains the right to willfully secede from the USSR." However, a republic's theoretical secession from the union was virtually impossible and unrealistic in many ways prior to Gorbachev's perestroika reforms.

=== Independent Ukraine (since 1991) ===
Ukraine

United Nations membership
- Membership: Full member
- Since: 26 August 1991 (1945–91 UkrSSR seat subsumed)
- UNSC seat: Non-permanent
- Permanent Representative: Hennadiy Udovenko (1984–92); Victor Batiuk (1992–1993); Volodymyr Khandohiy (1993-1994); Borys Hudyma (1994); Anatoliy Zlenko (1994-1997); Volodymyr Yelchenko (1997–2001); Valeriy Kuchinsky (2001-2006); Viktor Kryzhanivsky (2006-2007); Yuriy Sergeyev (2007-2015); Volodymyr Yelchenko (2015-2019); Sergiy Kyslytsya (2019--2025); Andriy Melnyk (2025–)

During the events of the dissolution of the Soviet Union, on 26 August, 1991, the Permanent Representative of the Ukrainian SSR, Hennadiy Udovenko, informed the office of the Secretary General of the United Nations that his permanent mission to the international assembly would officially be designated as representing Ukraine.

Since 1992, Ukraine has consistently supported peaceful, negotiated settlements to disputes. It has participated in the multilateral talks on the conflict in Moldova and promoted a peaceful resolution to conflict in the post-Soviet state of Georgia. Ukraine also has made a substantial contribution to UN peacekeeping operations.

On March 27, 2014, the UN adopted Resolution 68/262, entitled Territorial integrity of Ukraine, by the sixty-eighth session of the United Nations General Assembly in response to the Russian annexation of Crimea. The non-binding resolution, which was supported by 100 United Nations member states, affirmed the General Assembly's commitment to the territorial integrity of Ukraine within its internationally recognized borders and underscored the invalidity of the 2014 Crimean referendum. Eleven nations voted against the resolution, while 58 abstained, and a further 24 states were absent when the vote took place.

=== Russo-Ukrainian war (2014–) ===
Related UNGA resolutions

- Res. 71/205, 19 December 2016, "Situation of human rights in the Autonomous Republic of Crimea and the city of Sevastopol (Ukraine)."
- Res. 72/190, 19 December 2017, "Situation of human rights in the Autonomous Republic of Crimea and the city of Sevastopol, Ukraine."
- Res. 73/194, 17 December 2018, "Problem of the militarization of the Autonomous Republic of Crimea and the city of Sevastopol, Ukraine, as well as parts of the Black Sea and the Sea of Azov."
- Res. 73/263, 22 December 2018, "Situation of human rights in the Autonomous Republic of Crimea and the city of Sevastopol, Ukraine."
- Res. 74/17, 9 December 2019, "Problem of the militarization of the Autonomous Republic of Crimea and the city of Sevastopol, Ukraine, as well as parts of the Black Sea and the Sea of Azov."
- Res. 74/168, 18 December 2019, "Situation of human rights in the Autonomous Republic of Crimea and the city of Sevastopol, Ukraine."
- Res. 75/29, 7 December 2020, "Problem of the militarization of the Autonomous Republic of Crimea and the city of Sevastopol, Ukraine, as well as parts of the Black Sea and the Sea of Azov."
- Res. 75/192, 16 December 2020, "Situation of human rights in the Autonomous Republic of Crimea and the city of Sevastopol, Ukraine."
- Res. 76/70, 9 December 2021, "Problem of the militarization of the Autonomous Republic of Crimea and the city of Sevastopol, Ukraine, as well as parts of the Black Sea and the Sea of Azov"
- Res. 76/179, 16 December 2021, "Situation of human rights in the temporarily occupied Autonomous Republic of Crimea and the city of Sevastopol, Ukraine"
- The United Nations General Assembly Resolution 77/229, 15 December 2022, titled "Situation of human rights in the temporarily occupied Autonomous Republic of Crimea and the city of Sevastopol, Ukraine"

Related UNSC resolutions

- On 27 February 2022, the United Nations Security Council Resolution 2623 called for the eleventh emergency special session of the United Nations General Assembly on the subject of the Russian invasion of Ukraine. As of April 2025, the session is temporarily adjourned after more than 20 plenary meetings have been sat.
  - Resolutions of the Eleventh emergency special session of the UNGA
- The United Nations Security Council Resolution 2774 was adopted on 24 February 2025.

== See also ==
- Foreign relations of Ukraine
- Permanent Representative of Ukraine to the United Nations
- Eleventh emergency special session of the United Nations General Assembly
- United Nations General Assembly Resolution ES-11/1, "Aggression against Ukraine"
- Ukraine–European Union relations
- Ukraine–NATO relations
