= Kryzhanovsky =

Kryzhanovsky (Russian: Крыжановский) or Kryzhanivsky(i) (Ukrainian: Крижанівський) is a surname. Notable people with the name include:

- Adam Krijanovski, Mayor of Chișinău, Moldova, in 1867–1869
- Anton Kryzhanovsky (born 1995), Russian intersex activist, Russian intersex activist
- Nikolai Kryzhanovsky (1937–2024), Belarusian politician
- Oleg Kryzhanovsky (1918–1997), Russian entomologist
- Viktor Kryzhanivsky (1961–2021), Ukrainian diplomat
- Viktor Kryzhanivskyi (1950–2016), Ukrainian artist
- Volodymyr Kryzhanivsky (born 1940), Ukrainian politician and diplomat

== See also ==
- Krzyżanowski, original Polish spelling of the surname
- Krzhizhanovsky
