= Krzhizhanovsky =

Krzhizhanovsky (feminine: Krzhizhanovskaya) is a Russian surname derived from Polish Krzyżanowski. Notable persons with that name include:

- Gleb Krzhizhanovsky (1872–1959), Soviet economist
- Sigizmund Krzhizhanovsky (1887–1950), Russian short-story writer
- Zinaida Krzhizhanovskaya, (1869–1948), Russian revolutionary

== See also ==
- Krzyżanowski, original Polish spelling of the surname
- Kryzhanovsky
