= Udovychenko =

Udovychenko is a surname. Notable people with the surname include:

- Oleksandr Udovychenko (1887–1975), Ukrainian general
- Petro Udovychenko (1914–1992), Ukrainian politician
