= Batiuk =

Batiuk is a surname. Notable people with the surname include:

- Tom Batiuk (born 1947), American comic artist
- Victor Batiuk (1939–1996), Ukrainian diplomat and poet
- John Batiuk (1923–2005), Canadian politician
