= Nevzorov =

Nevzorov (masculine, Russian: Невзоров) or Nevzorova (feminine, Russian: Невзорова) is a Russian surname. Notable people with the surname include:

- Alexander Nevzorov (born 1958), Russian–Ukrainian blogger, filmmaker, journalist, and politician
- Boris Nevzorov (1950–2022), Russian actor and director
- Boris Nevzorov (born 1955), Russian politician
- Vladimir Nevzorov (born 1952), Russian judoka
- Zinaida Nevzorova (1869–1948), Russian revolutionary
