= Razali Ismail =

Malaysian diplomat (b. 1939)

Yang Berbahagia Tan Sri Dato' Razali Ismail PSM DSDK
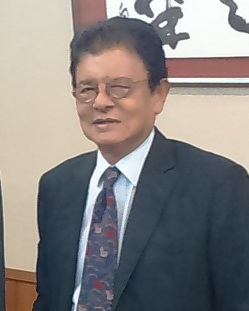
- Razali in 2015

Chairman of Human Rights Commission of Malaysia
- In office 21 June 2016 – 26 June 2019
- Preceded by: Hasmy Agam
- Succeeded by: Othman Hashim

President of the United Nations General Assembly
- In office 17 September 1996 – 15 September 1997
- Preceded by: Diogo Freitas do Amaral
- Succeeded by: Hennadiy Udovenko

Malaysian Ambassador to Poland
- In office 1978–1982
- Monarch: Sultan Ahmad Shah
- Preceded by: Position established

Malaysian High Commissioner to India
- In office 23 May 1982 – 20 May 1985
- Monarchs: Sultan Ahmad Shah; Sultan Iskandar
- Preceded by: Mon Jamaluddin
- Succeeded by: Mohamed Haron

Personal details
- Born: Razali bin Ismail; 14 April 1939 (age 87) Alor Setar, Kedah, Federated Malay States, British Malaya (now Malaysia)
- Citizenship: Malaysian
- Education: Sultan Abdul Hamid College; Malay College Kuala Kangsar
- Alma mater: University of Malaya (BA)
- Occupation: Diplomat

Razali bin Ismail (born 14 April 1939) is a Malaysian diplomat. He is formerly the Chairman of the Human Rights Commission of Malaysia (SUHAKAM) from 2016 to 2019. He was also the 51st President of the United Nations General Assembly from 1996 until 1997.

== Early life and education ==
He received his education at the Sultan Abdul Hamid College and completed his studies in 1956. Then he continued his education at the Malay College Kuala Kangsar (MCKK) for 2 years. He holds a Bachelor of Arts degree with Honors in literature and the humanities from Universiti Malaya and an Honorary Doctorate from Universiti Kebangsaan Malaysia.

== Career and post ==
Razali Ismail first joined the Malaysian Ministry of Foreign Affairs in 1962 and went on to become the Ministry's Deputy Secretary-General in 1985. Before he was appointed to the post, he served as the Malaysia's Assistant High Commissioner in Madras from 1963 to 1964, Second Secretary of Malaysia's Embassy in Paris in between 1966 and 1968, the Counsellor in the Malaysian High Commission in London from 1970 until 1972 and the Chargé d'affaires in Vientiane from 1974 until 1976. He was later the Malaysian Ambassador to Poland from 1978 to 1982 and to India between 1982 and 1985.

After his tenure as Malaysian Ministry of Foreign Affairs' Deputy Secretary-General, he became increasingly involved with the United Nations. In 1989 and 1990, he headed the Malaysian delegation to the United Nations. At the same time, he was the chairman of United Nations Security Council. From 1996 to 1997, he became the President of the United Nations General Assembly.

In the past, he usually headed Malaysian diplomatic delegation to various regional and international bodies such as ASEAN and the Non-Aligned Movement. Until a few years ago, he had been Malaysia's Permanent Representative to the United Nations.

Up until 2005, he was United Nations Secretary-General's Special Envoy to Myanmar and played a pivotal role in releasing Aung San Suu Kyi from house arrest in May 2002. However, his impartiality as a UN Special Envoy was questioned by American officials in an embassy cable that was released via Wikileaks, alleging his business ties with the Burmese military regime. Later however, Myanmar military junta repeatedly denied him entry to Myanmar, contributing to his decision to quit the special envoy status in December 2005.

== Honours ==
=== Honours of Malaysia ===
- Malaysia
  - Commander of the Order of Loyalty to the Crown of Malaysia (PSM) – Tan Sri (1991)
- Kedah
  - Knight Companion of the Order of Loyalty to the Royal House of Kedah (DSDK) – Dato' (1985)

=== Honorary degrees ===
- Malaysia
  - Honorary Doctorate degree from National University of Malaysia

Diplomatic posts
Preceded by Diogo Freitas do Amaral	President of the United Nations General Assembly; 1996–1997	Succeeded by Hennadiy Udovenko
