= Gleb Krzhizhanovsky =

Russian-Soviet scientist, statesman, revolutionary, geographer and writer

- Глеб Кржижановский
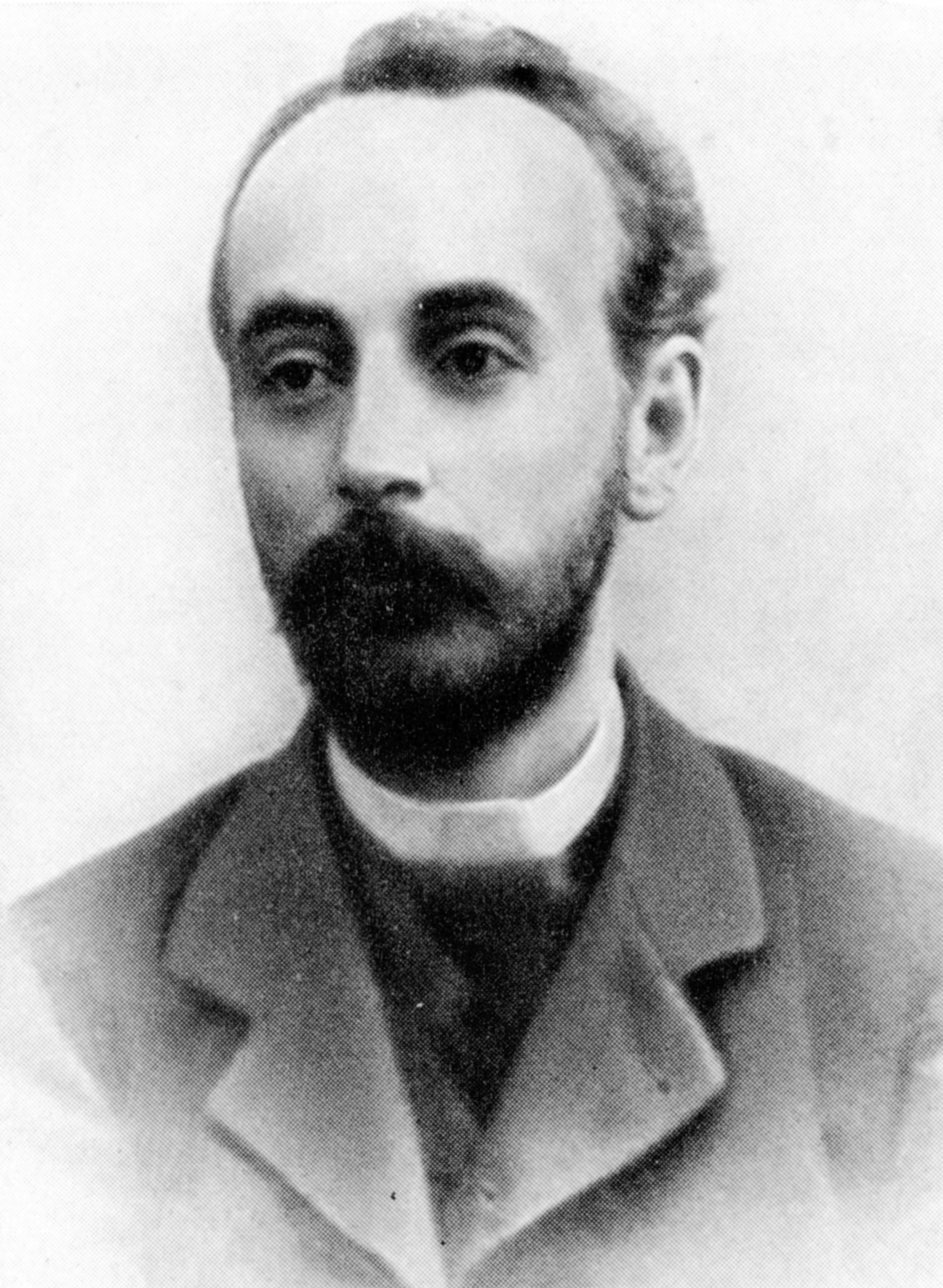
- Krzhizhanovsky in 1904

Chairman of the State Planning Committee
- In office February 1921 – 11 December 1923
- Premier: Vladimir Lenin
- Preceded by: Post established
- Succeeded by: Alexander Tsiurupa
- In office 18 November 1925 – 10 November 1930
- Premier: Alexei Rykov
- Preceded by: Alexander Tsiurupa
- Succeeded by: Valerian Kuybyshev

Personal details
- Born: 24 January 1872 Samara, Samara Governorate, Russian Empire
- Died: 31 March 1959 (aged 87) Moscow Oblast, Russian SFSR, Soviet Union
- Resting place: Kremlin Wall Necropolis
- Party: Russian Social Democratic Labor Party (1898–1903); RSDLP (Bolsheviks) (1903–1918); Russian Communist Party (Bolsheviks) (1918–1959)
- Spouse: Zinaida Nevzorova (m. 1899; death 1948)
- Education: Saint Petersburg State Institute of Technology
- Occupation: Scientist, translator, writer
- Awards: Hero of Socialist Labour

Gleb Maksimilianovich Krzhizhanovsky (Russian: Глеб Максимилианович Кржижановский; 24 January [O.S. 12 January] 1872 – 31 March 1959) was a Soviet scientist, statesman, revolutionary, Old Bolshevik, and state figure as well as a geographer and writer.

Born to the family of a nobleman of Polish descent (Polish surname: Krzyżanowski), he became the longtime chairman of the Gosplan and director of the GOELRO, an Academician of Academy of Sciences of the Soviet Union (1929) and a Hero of Socialist Labour (1957).

== Life and career ==
Krzhizhanovsky was born in 1872 to an intellectual family in Samara. In 1889 he moved to Saint Petersburg, where he attended the Saint Petersburg State Institute of Technology, becoming involved in Marxist circles in 1891. He was a close friend and colleague of Lenin, with whom he edited the newspaper Rabotnik ('The Worker') and, in 1895, he was a co-founder, with Lenin, of the League of Struggle for the Emancipation of the Working Class.

He was arrested with Lenin and others in a police round up of the Union of Struggle in December 1895, and spent 17 months in Butyrka prison, where he wrote the Russian text of the Polish revolutionary song Warszawianka and the Ukrainian song Rage, Tyrants. Afterwards, he was exiled to Minusinsk, in Siberia, near enough to Lenin's place of exile for them to stay in touch. In 1899, he married Zinaida Nevzorova, a fellow Marxist who had shared his time in exile. They settled in Samara, where he worked as a railroad engineer, and they handled distribution of the newspaper Iskra, founded by Lenin, using the aliases 'Clair' and 'The Snail'.

In 1903, Krzhizhanovsky was a member of the organising committee for the 2nd Congress of the Russian Social Democratic Labour Party (RSDLP), in Brussels, at which the party split between the Bolshevik and Menshevik factions, and was elected in his absence to its Central Committee. He travelled to Geneva afterwards hoping to reunite the two factions, but realised that mutual hostility had risen to such a pitch that it was no longer possible. In 1904–5 he was involved in organising the 3rd Congress of the Russian Social Democratic Labor Party.

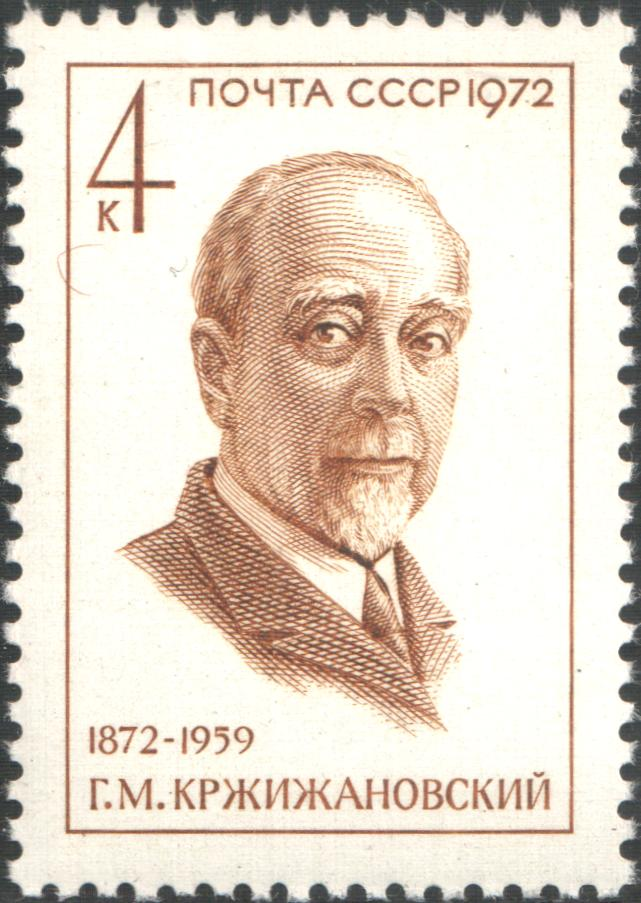
Soviet Stamp commemorating Gleb Krzhizhanovsky on the 100th anniversary of his birth, 1972

Krzhizhanovsky withdrew from revolutionary activity after the failure of the 1905 Revolution. In 1910 he oversaw the construction of a power station near Moscow and proposed the idea of a hydroelectric plant in Saratov. After the February Revolution in 1917, he was appointed director of the fuel section of the Moscow Soviet. Later, he was director of an electric transmission station near Moscow.

Krzhizhanovsky returned to prominence in January 1920, when, with Lenin's encouragement, he published an article in Pravda on entitled 'Tasks of Electrification of Industry'. In February, he was appointed head of Goelro, the hundred strong commission charged with putting into practice Lenin's latest slogan – "Communism is Soviet power plus electrification of the whole country.' When Gosplan was created, in 1921, with Goelro as one its sub-committees, Krzhizhanovsky was appointed its first chairman. He was a member of the Central Committee of the Communist Party of the Soviet Union in 1924–1939.

In 1929–39 he was vice-president of the Academy of Sciences of the Soviet Union. He supervised the cleansing of the academy from "bourgeois specialists" and the work "to fulfill the tasks of the party and the government on bringing the activity of the Academy of Sciences closer to the demands of the socialist economy." In 1930–39, he was head of the Energy Institute of the USSR Academy of Sciences. Krzhizhanovsky was appointed to the editorial board of the Great Soviet Encyclopedia, contributing several articles concerning electricity and planning.

Krzhizhanovsky died in Moscow in 1959. He was cremated and the ashes were placed in an urn in the Kremlin Wall Necropolis on Red Square in Moscow.
