= Valeriy Kuchinsky =

Ukrainian diplomat and politician

- Валерій Кучинський

Permanent Representative of Ukraine to the United Nations
- In office 2001–2006
- Preceded by: Volodymyr Yelchenko
- Succeeded by: Viktor Kryzhanivsky

Personal details
- Born: 25 October 1944 (age 81) Kyiv, Ukrainian SSR, Soviet Union
- Education: Kyiv University

Valeriy Kuchinsky (Ukrainian: Валерій Павлович Кучинський, romanized: Valerii Pavlovych Kuchynskyi; born 25 October 1944) is a Ukrainian diplomat and politician, who has served as Ambassador Extraordinary and Plenipotentiary of Ukraine, and Permanent Representative of Ukraine to the United Nations. He has served on the board of the Ministry of Foreign Affairs of Ukraine, and as Executive Secretary of the Ukrainian National Commission for the United Nations Educational, Scientific and Cultural Organizations (UNESCO). Adjunct Professor of International Relations Columbia University Ukrainian Studies Program.

== Early life and education ==
Born in Kyiv, on 25 October 1944, Kuchinsky graduated from Taras Shevchenko National University of Kyiv, PhD (1967). He is fluent in Ukrainian, English, Russian and French.

== Professional career and experience ==
From 1971 – he has worked for Ministry of Foreign Affairs of Ukraine.

In 1975–1980 – he was a member of the United Nations Secretariat.

in 1990–1992 – Director of the Ministry's Department of Arms Control and Disarmament

In 1992–1997 – deputy Chief of Mission at the Ukrainian Embassy to the United States in Washington, D.C.

In 1997–1998 – He has held posts in the Ministry's Departments of International Organizations and of the Americas

In 1998–1999 – Mr. Kuchinsky is Director-General of the Ministry Department of International Organizations and of the Americas

from December 1999 – he was the First Deputy Permanent Representative.

from November 2000 – he served as acting Permanent Representative to the United Nations

In September 2001 – May 2006 – Permanent Representative of Ukraine to the United Nations, he has also served as Vice-President of the Economic and Social Council from 2003 to 2004.

Was elected Chairman of the Third Committee (Social, Humanitarian and Cultural) for the General Assembly's fifty-ninth session on 10 June 2004.

In 2002–2003 – he has also served as Ukraine's Ambassador to Jamaica and to Trinidad and Tobago.

Adjunct Professor of International Relations Columbia University Ukrainian Studies Program.

== Diplomatic rank ==
- Ambassador Extraordinary and Plenipotentiary of Ukraine.
