= Yuriy Sergeyev =

Ukrainian diplomat and politician

- Юрій Сергеєв
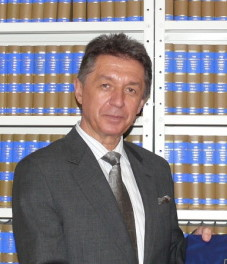
- Sergeyev in 2013

Permanent Representative of Ukraine to the United Nations
- In office 18 April 2007 – 9 December 2015
- Preceded by: Viktor Kryzhanivsky
- Succeeded by: Volodymyr Yelchenko

Ambassador of Ukraine to Bahamas (concurrently)
- Incumbent
- Assumed office 2008
- President: Viktor Yushchenko; Viktor Yanukovych

Ambassador of Ukraine to France
- In office 2003–2007
- President: Viktor Yushchenko; Viktor Yanukovych
- Preceded by: Anatoliy Zlenko
- Succeeded by: Kostiantyn Tymochenko

Ambassador of Ukraine to Greece (Albania concurrently)
- In office 1997–2000
- President: Leonid Kuchma
- Preceded by: Borys Korneyenko

Personal details
- Born: 5 February 1956 (age 70) Leninakan (Armenia)
- Education: Kyiv University

Yuriy Anatoliyovych Sergeyev (Ukrainian: Юрій Анатолійович Сергеєв; born 5 February 1956) is a former Ukrainian diplomat and politician, who has served as Ambassador Extraordinary and Plenipotentiary of Ukraine, and Permanent Representative of Ukraine to the United Nations.

== Early life and education ==
Born on February 5, 1956, in Leninakan (Armenia), Sergeyev graduated from Taras Shevchenko National University of Kyiv, Ph.D. (1981). He was later a Senior Fellow as well as a Lecturer in EU Studies and Political Science at Yale University (2016-2020). He is fluent in English, Russian and French.

== Professional career and experience ==
- 1981–1992 — Assistant, Docent at the Philological Faculty of Taras Shevchenko National University of Kyiv, Deputy Director of the Institute of Ukrainian Studies.
- April 1992 — September 1993 — Director, Press Service of the Ministry of Foreign Affairs of Ukraine.
- August — December 1994 — Director, Secretariat of the Minister for Foreign Affairs of Ukraine.
- December 1994 — January 1997; September 1993 — August 1994 — Director, Directorate for Information of the Ministry of Foreign Affairs of Ukraine.
- January — November 1997 — Counselor-Envoy for the Embassy of Ukraine to the United Kingdom of Great Britain and Northern Ireland.
- November 1997 — December 2000 — Ambassador Extraordinary and Plenipotentiary of Ukraine to Greece and Albania (with the residence in Athens).
- December 2000 — February 2001 — Director-General, Directorate-General for Foreign Policy of the Administration of the President of Ukraine.
- February — July 2001 — Deputy Minister for Foreign Affairs of Ukraine.
- July 2001 — March 2003 — Secretary of State of the Ministry of Foreign Affairs of Ukraine.
- March 2003 — April 2007 — Ambassador Extraordinary and Plenipotentiary of Ukraine to France, Permanent Representative of Ukraine to UNESCO.
- April 2007 — present Permanent Representative of Ukraine to the United Nations
- 2008 — present Ambassador Extraordinary and Plenipotentiary of Ukraine to Commonwealth of the Bahamas (with the residence in New York City)
- 2008 — elected member of the United Nations Human Rights Council
- September 2012 — elected Chair of the Sixth Committee (Legal and Administrative) at the United Nations
- 2015 — non-permanent member to the United Nations Security Council
- On 9 December 2015 Volodymyr Yelchenko replaced Sergeyev as permanent Representative of Ukraine to the United Nations. Early February 2016 Sergeyev announced the end of his diplomatic career.

== Awards and decorations ==
- April 2003 The State "Order of Merit" of Ukraine
- Honorary Decree of the Ministry of Foreign Affairs of Ukraine

== Diplomatic rank ==
- Ambassador Extraordinary and Plenipotentiary of Ukraine.
