= Krzyżanowski =

Krzyżanowski (feminine Krzyżanowska) is a Polish surname. Notable persons with that name include:

- Adam Krzyżanowski, Polish economist, former director of the Polish Academy of Learning
- Adrian Krzyżanowski (1788–1852), Polish mathematician
- Aleksander Krzyżanowski (1895–1951), Polish military officer
- Anton Krzyzanowski (born 1995), Russian intersex activist and sound designer
- Justyna Krzyżanowska (1782–1861), Polish amateur musician, and pianist who became the first music teacher of her son, the virtuoso pianist and composer Frédéric Chopin
- Halina Krzyżanowska (1860–1937), Polish composer
- Konrad Krzyżanowski (1872–1922), Polish painter
- Marcin Krzyżanowski (born 1994), Polish chess grandmaster
- Olga Krzyżanowska (1929–2018), Polish politician
- Rudolf Krzyzanowski (1859–1911), Austrian composer, pupil of Anton Bruckner
- Tadeusz Krzyżanowski (1920–1987), Polish athlete
- Włodzimierz Krzyżanowski (1824–1887), Polish engineer and military leader
- Julian Krzyżanowski, Polish literature historian
- Irena Sendler (1910–2008), née Krzyżanowska

== See also ==
- Kryzhanovsky, Krzhizhanovsky, Russified versions of the surname
