= Volodymyr Kravets (diplomat) =

Ukrainian diplomat

- Володимир Кравець

Ministry of Foreign Affairs of the Ukrainian SSR
- In office 1984–1990
- Prime Minister: Oleksandr Liashko
- Preceded by: Volodymyr Martynenko
- Succeeded by: Anatoliy Zlenko

Permanent Representative of Ukraine to the United Nations
- In office 1979–1984
- Preceded by: Volodymyr Martynenko
- Succeeded by: Hennadiy Udovenko

Personal details
- Born: 3 May 1930 Uman Raion, Ukrainian SSR, Soviet Union
- Died: 22 July 2011 (aged 81) Kyiv, Ukraine
- Education: Taras Shevchenko National University of Kyiv

Volodymyr Kravets (Ukrainian: Володимир Олексійович Кравець; 3 May 1930 – 22 July 2011) was a Ukrainian diplomat who served as Permanent Representative of Ukraine to the United Nations and Minister of Foreign Affairs of the Ukrainian SSR.

== Education ==
Volodymyr Martynenko graduated from Taras Shevchenko National University of Kyiv (1953), University of Kharkiv (1956). Ph.D.

== Professional career and experience ==
In 1953-1954 - he was Instructor of the Kyiv City Committee of the Communist Party of Ukraine. In 1956-1961 - he was Lecturer, Senior Lecturer, Department of Marxism–Leninism Kharkiv Aviation Institute, then Umansky Agricultural Institute. In 1961-1965 - He worked as a consultant of the Department of Science and Culture of the Central Committee of the Communist Party. In 1965-1967 - Senior Lecturer of Party History of the Kyiv National University of Construction and Architecture. In 1967-1971 - he was Counsellor Minister of Foreign Affairs of the Ukrainian SSR. In 1971-1979 - he was in office Deputy Minister of Foreign Affairs of the Ukrainian SSR. In 1979-1984 - Permanent Representative of Ukraine to the United Nations. From 29 December 1984 - 27 July 1990 - Minister of Foreign Affairs of the Ukrainian SSR.

He participated in the 2 th, 23rd, 24th, 36th and 39th session of the General Assembly of the United Nations; headed the delegation of the Ukrainian SSR on 40-44th session of the UN on 6th, 8th and 9th Emergency Special Session, 3rd Special Session on Disarmament and the 14th Special Session of the UN General of the Namibian problem; In 1985, several presided over the meetings of the Security Council of the United Nations.

== Diplomatic rank ==
- Ambassador Extraordinary and Plenipotentiary
