= Borys Hudyma =

Ukrainian diplomat and politician

- Борис Гудима

Ambassador of Ukraine to the European Union
- In office 10 December 1997 – 21 March 2000
- Preceded by: Ihor Mityukov
- Succeeded by: Roman Speck

Permanent Representative of Ukraine to the United Nations
- In office 1994–1994
- Preceded by: Victor Batiuk
- Succeeded by: Anatoliy Zlenko

Personal details
- Born: 29 December 1941 (age 84) Primorsky Krai
- Education: Kyiv University

Borys Mykolayovych Hudyma (Ukrainian: Борис Миколайович Гудима; born 29 December 1941) is a Ukrainian diplomat and politician, who has served as Ukraine's ambassador to the European Union and as Permanent Representative of Ukraine to the United Nations.

== Early life and education ==
Borys Hudyma graduated from the Taras Shevchenko National University of Kyiv, Faculty of Philology (1969); Faculty of Law (1982); Rate improving diplomatic representatives at the Diplomatic Academy of the Foreign Ministry of the USSR (1983). He speaks foreign languages: English, Russian and Spanish.

== Professional career and experience ==
From 1969 to 1971 - he was a translator of English group of Soviet specialists in Damascus Syria.

From 1971 to 1974 - he taught at the Department of Theory and Practice of Translation Faculty of Philology of the Taras Shevchenko National University of Kyiv.

From 1974 - was a senior laboratory and Translation Institute of State and Law of Ukraine.

From 1974 to 1975 - he worked Attaché Consular Department of the MFA of the Ukrainian SSR.

From 1975 to 1980 - he was an employee of the International Labour Organization in Geneva.

From 1980 to 1982 - he was as 2nd Foreign Ministry Secretary Ukrainian SSR.

From 1982 to 1983 - he participated in the courses of improvement governing diplomatic staff at the Diplomatic Academy of the USSR Ministry of Foreign Affairs.

From 1983 to 1984 - he was as 2nd Secretary Ministry of Foreign Affairs of Ukraine.

From 1984 to 1989 - he was as 2nd, 1st Secretary of the Permanent Mission of the Ukrainian Soviet Socialist Republic to the United Nations in New York City.

From 1989 to 1993 - he was as 1st Secretary, Counselor, Department of International Economic Organizations, Counsellor, Head of International Organizations. Member of the delegation of the Ukrainian SSR at 46th session of the UN General Assembly.

From December 1992 to 1994 - he was head of International Organizations, Ministry of Foreign Affairs Ukraine member of the board.

From 1994 to 1996 - he was the Deputy Permanent Representative of Ukraine to the United Nations.

From March 1996 to January 1998 - he was the Deputy Minister of Foreign Affairs of Ukraine. Chairman of the Intergovernmental Commission on Cooperation Ukraine within the Central European Initiative. Member of the commission for drafting bilateral agreements with Ukraine Bulgaria, the Czech Republic and the Federal Republic of Germany on Yamburgskoye agreements. Member of the advisory board of independent experts with comprehensive solutions to problems related linked to the Chernobyl nuclear power plant Member State Interdepartmental Commission for perpetuating the memory of the victims of war and political repression.

From April 1996 to November 1997 - Member Committee President of Ukraine on citizenship..

From December 1997 to July 2000 - member of the commission on nuclear policy and environmental security of the President of Ukraine.

On 10 December 1997 on 21 March 2000 - he was a representative of Ukraine to the European Union.

On 21 March 2000 on 19 April 2004 - he Extraordinary and Plenipotentiary of Ukraine to the Republic of Italy. Signed on behalf of Ukraine Convention on international interests in mobile equipment and the Protocol to the convention on international interests in mobile equipment on matters relating to aircraft equipment, adopted on 16 November 2001 in the Cape Town.

From 21 March 2000 to 19 April 2004 - he was the Ambassador of Ukraine to the Republic of Malta concurrently. Signed Agreement between the Government of Ukraine and the Republic of Malta on cooperation in combating illicit trafficking in narcotic drugs, psychotropic substances and precursors and organized crime.

From 21 March 2000 to 19 April 2004 - he was the Ambassador of Ukraine to the Republic of San Marino in combination.

From 19 January 2004 to April 2004 - he Permanent Representative of Ukraine to the Food and Agriculture Organization (FAO) of the UN in combination.

From 26 August 2004 to 9 June 2006 - he was Ambassador to the Kingdom of Morocco.

From 26 August 2004 to 26 December 2006 - he was Ambassador to Mauritania in combination.

== Diplomatic rank ==
- Ambassador Extraordinary and Plenipotentiary of Ukraine.
