= Permanent Representative of Ukraine to the United Nations =

Head of the permanent mission of Ukraine to the United Nations

- Arms of Ukraine

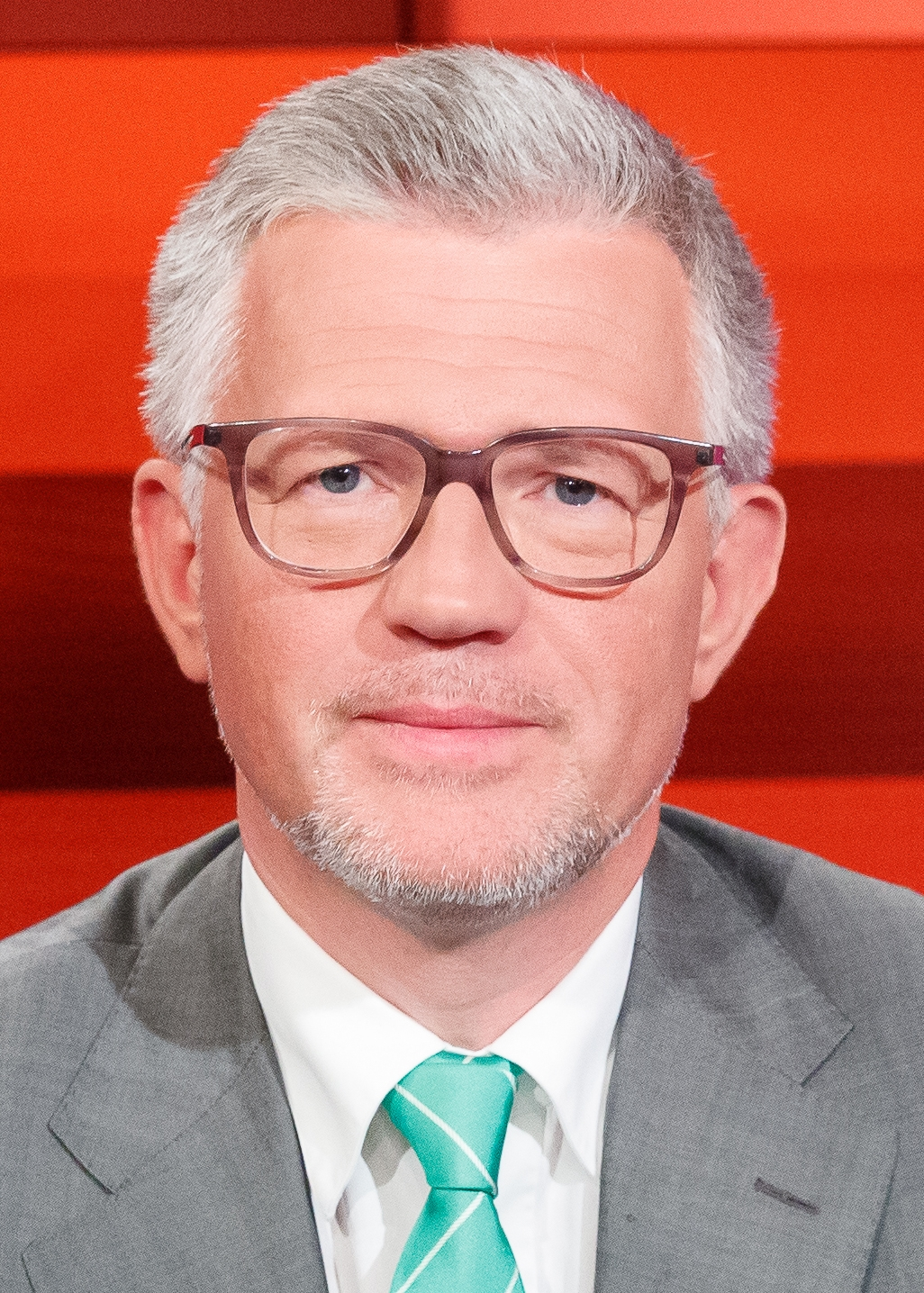
- Incumbent; Andriy Melnyk since 21 December 2024
- Inaugural holder: Dmitry Manuilsky
- Formation: October 24, 1945
- Website: Official MFA page

This is a list of the Permanent Representatives of Ukraine to the United Nations. Permanent Representative is the head of the permanent mission of Ukraine to the United Nations.

== History ==
On 26 June 1945, the Charter of the United Nations was signed and came into force on 24 October 1945. Ukraine was among the first countries that signed the United Nations Charter, becoming a founding member of the United Nations among 51 countries.

Dmitry Manuilsky, head of the Ukrainian delegation at the United Nations Conference on International Organization, held in April–June 1945 in San Francisco, was elected Chairman of the First Committee, which elaborated the Preamble and Chapter 1 (Purposes and Principles) of the United Nations Charter. Until 1958 the permanent mission of Ukraine was led by the Minister of Foreign Affairs rather than the permanent representative.

Since Ukraine's independence in August 1991, membership in the United Nations is a priority of Ukraine's foreign policy.

== Permanent Mission Composition ==
The permanent mission of Ukraine consists of a permanent representative, three counsellors (one of which is a permanent representative deputy) and a military adviser. The permanent mission also includes about 10 various secretaries and attaches.

== List ==
Permanent Representative of Ukraine to the United Nations
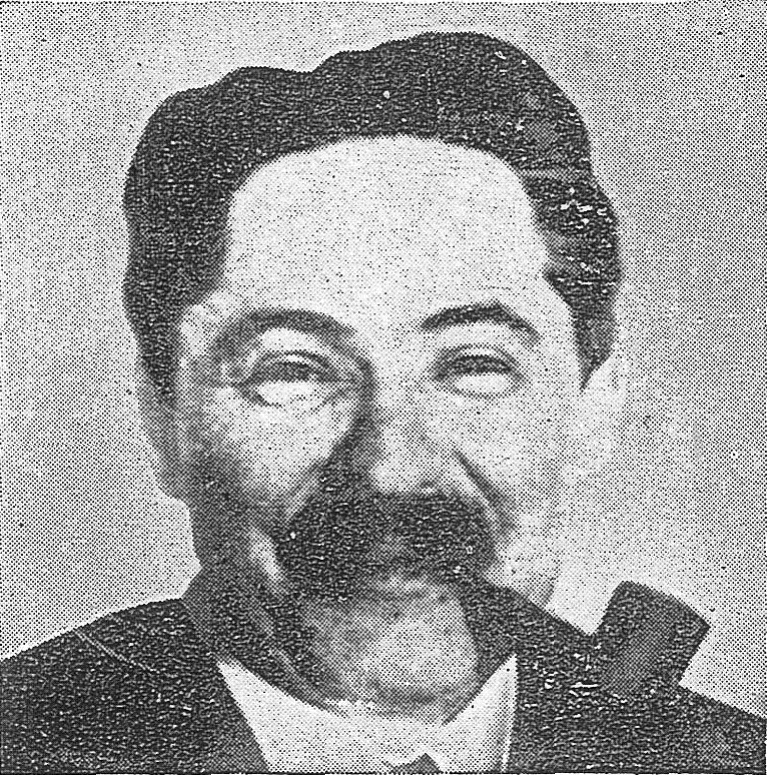
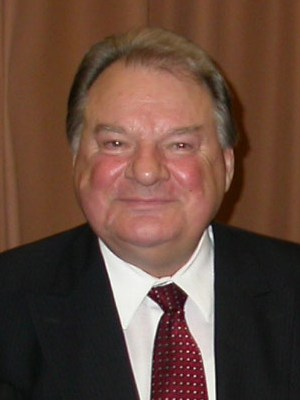
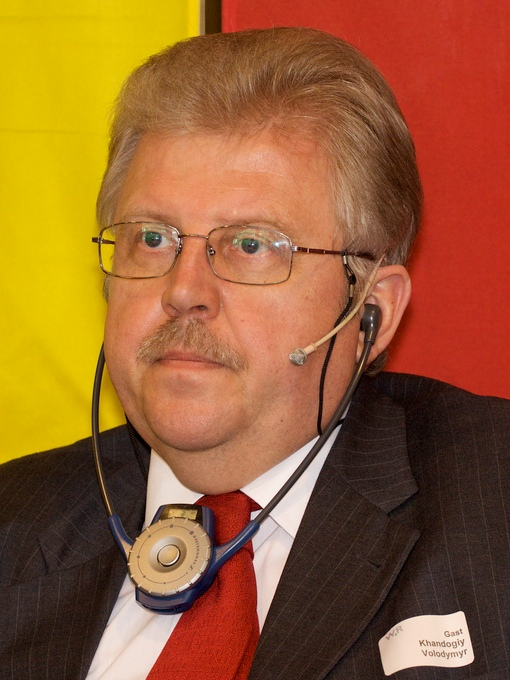
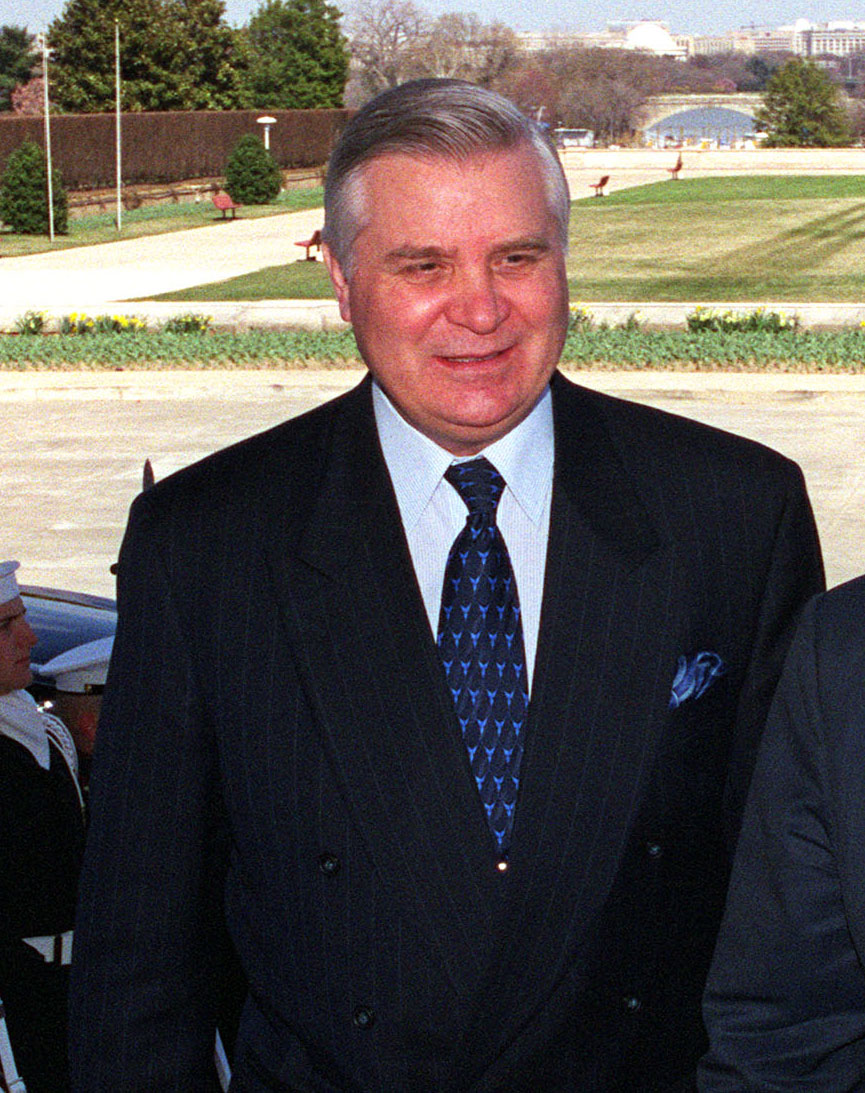
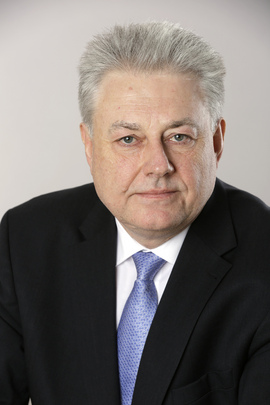
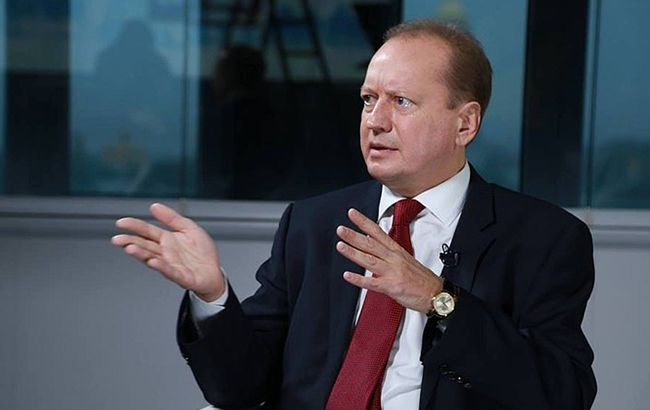
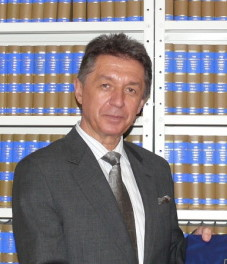
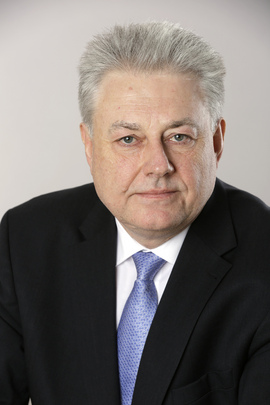
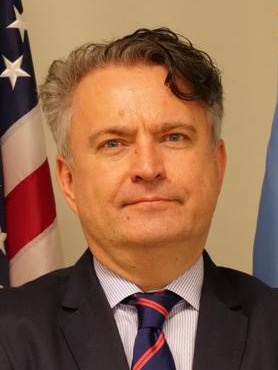
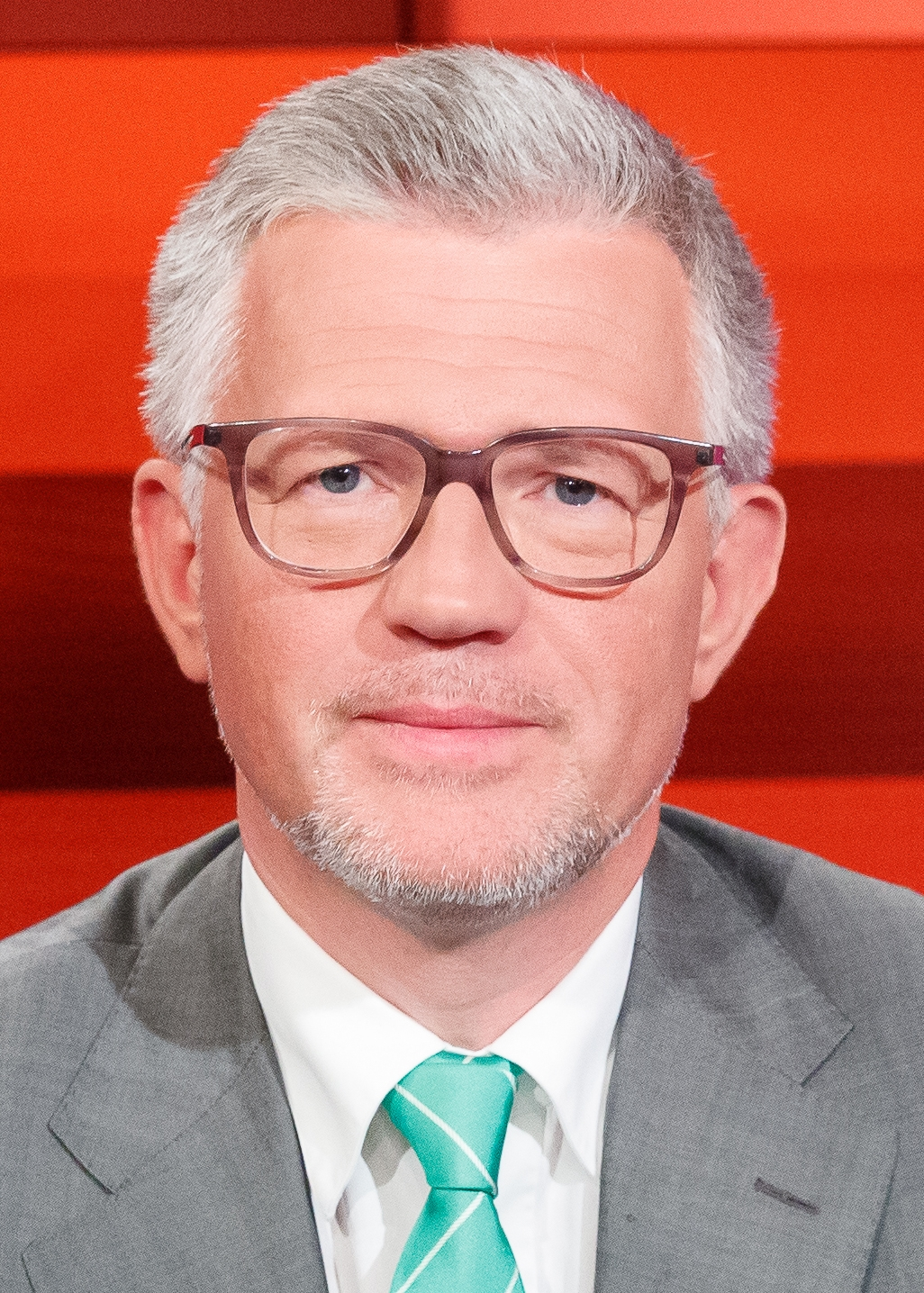
No.	Permanent Representative	Term
Ukrainian Soviet Socialist Republic (1919–1991) •
1	Dmitry Manuilsky	(1945-1952); Ministers of Foreign Affairs; Head of the Ukrainian delegation
2	Anatoliy Baranovsky	(1952-1954); Ministers of Foreign Affairs; Head of the Ukrainian delegation
3	Luka Palamarchuk	(1954-1958); Ministers of Foreign Affairs; Head of the Ukrainian delegation
4	Petro Udovychenko	(1958-1961); Permanent Representative
5	Luka Kyzya	(1961-1964); Permanent Representative
6	Sergiy Shevchenko	(1964–1968); Permanent Representative
7	Mykhailo Polyanychko	(1968–1973); Permanent Representative
8	Volodymyr Martynenko	(1973–1979); Permanent Representative
9	Volodymyr Kravets	(1979–1984); Permanent Representative
10	Hennadiy Udovenko	(1984–1992); Permanent Representative
Ukraine (since 1991) •
11	Victor Batiuk	(1992–1993); Permanent Representative
–	Volodymyr Khandohiy	(1993-1994); Deputy Permanent Representative
–	Borys Hudyma	(1994); Deputy Permanent Representative
12	Anatoliy Zlenko	(1994-1997); Permanent Representative
13	Volodymyr Yelchenko	(1997-2001); Permanent Representative
14	Valeriy Kuchinsky	(2001-2006); Permanent Representative
–	Viktor Kryzhanivsky	(2006-2007); Deputy Permanent Representative
15	Yuriy Sergeyev	(2007-2015); Permanent Representative
16	Volodymyr Yelchenko	(2015-2019); Permanent Representative
17	Sergiy Kyslytsya	(2019-2024); Permanent Representative
18	Andriy Melnyk	(2024-); Permanent Representative

== See also ==
- Ukraine and the United Nations
- Foreign relations of Ukraine
- Vasyl Tarasenko - representative of the Ukrainian SSR in the United Nations Economic and Social Council, the United Nations Security Council (1948-1949).
