= List of ambassadors of Ukraine to Austria =

Ambassador of Ukraine to Austria

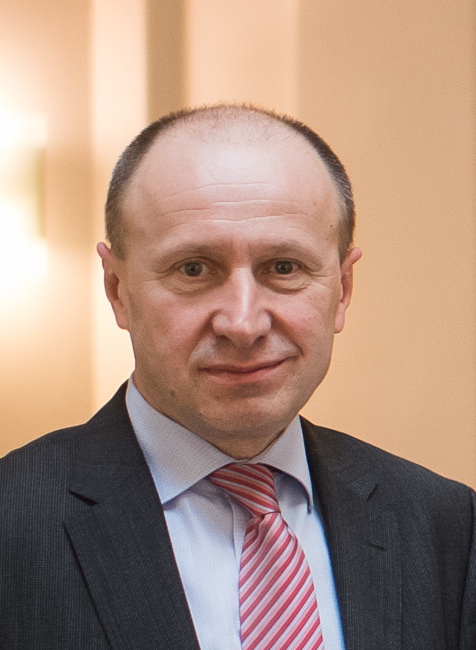
- Incumbent; Vasyl Khymynets since 30 July 2021
- Nominator: Volodymyr Zelenskyy
- Inaugural holder: Andriy Yakovliv as Ambassador Extraordinary and Plenipotentiary
- Formation: September 1992
- Website: Ukraine Embassy - Warsaw

The Ambassador Extraordinary and Plenipotentiary of Ukraine to Austria (Ukrainian: Надзвичайний і Повноважний посол України в Австрії) is the ambassador of Ukraine to Austria. The current ambassador is Vasyl Khymynets. He assumed the position on 30 July 2021.

The first Ukrainian ambassador to Austria assumed his post in 1918, the same year a Ukrainian embassy opened in Vienna.

== List of representatives ==
=== Ukrainian People's Republic ===
- 1918–1918 – Andriy Yakovliv
- 1918–1919 – Vyacheslav Lypynsky
- 1919–1921 – Hryhoriy Sydorenko
- 1921–1921 – Mykola Zaliznyak

=== Ukrainian Soviet Socialist Republic ===
- 1921–1922 – Yuriy Kotsiubynsky (important representative)
- 1922–1922 – Hryhoriy Besyedovsky (government delegate)
- 1922–1923 – Dmitriy Bogomolov (1st secretary)

=== Ukraine ===
- 1992–1994 – Yurii V. Kostenko
- 1994–1999 – Mykola Makarevych
- 1999–2004 – Volodymyr Ohryzko
- 2004–2005 – Yuriy Polurez
- 2005–2007 – Volodymyr Yelchenko
- 2007–2008 – Vadym Kostyuk (provisional)
- 2008–2010 – Yevhen Chornobryvko
- 2010–2010 – Vasyl Kyrylych (provisional)
- 2010–2014 – Andriy Bereznyi
- 2014–2021 – Oleksandr Shcherba
- Since 2021 – Vasyl Khymynets

== See also ==
- Ukrainian Embassy, Vienna
- Ambassador of Austria to Ukraine
