= Sergiy Kyslytsya =

Current Permanent Representative of Ukraine to the United Nations

- Сергій Кислиця
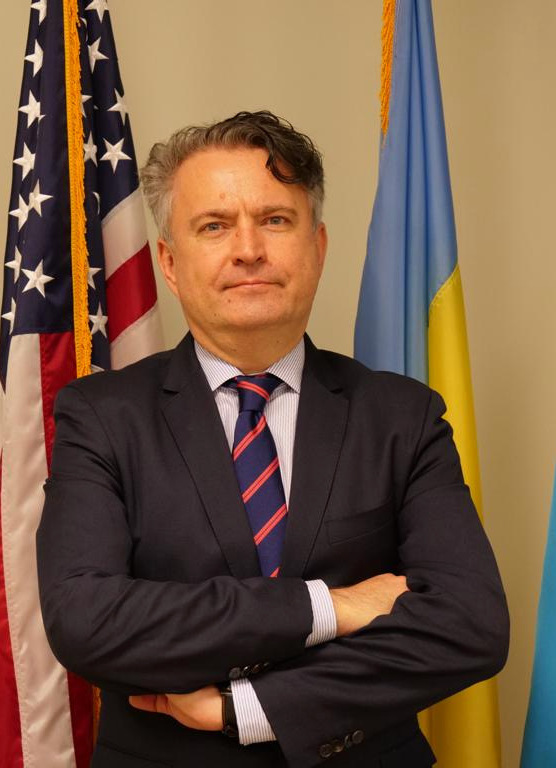
- Official portrait, 2020

First Deputy Head of the Office of the President of Ukraine
- Incumbent
- Assumed office 6 January 2026
- President: Volodymyr Zelenskyy
- Minister: Kyrylo Budanov

First Deputy Minister of Foreign Affairs
- In office 13 February 2025 – 5 January 2026
- President: Volodymyr Zelenskyy
- Minister: Andrii Sybiha
- Preceded by: Andrii Sybiha

Permanent Representative of Ukraine to the United Nations
- In office 18 December 2019 – 21 December 2024
- President: Volodymyr Zelenskyy
- Preceded by: Volodymyr Yelchenko
- Succeeded by: Andriy Melnyk

Personal details
- Born: 15 August 1969 (age 57) Kyiv, Ukrainian SSR, Soviet Union
- Children: 1
- Education: Kyiv University (MA)

Sergiy (Note: Also transliterated as Serhiy or Serhii) Olehovych Kyslytsya (Ukrainian: Сергій Олегович Кислиця, romanized: Serhii Olehovych Kyslytsia; born 15 August 1969) is a Ukrainian career diplomat, who serves as First Deputy Head of the Office of the President of Ukraine (since 5 January 2026). He had previously served as Deputy Minister of Foreign Affairs of Ukraine (2014–2019), and Permanent Representative of Ukraine to the United Nations (2019–2024). He holds the title of Ambassador Extraordinary and Plenipotentiary of Ukraine (2016) and Honoured Lawyer of Ukraine (2026).

== Early life and education ==
Born in Kyiv, Ukraine on 15 August 1969. Kyslytsya graduated cum laude from Taras Shevchenko National University of Kyiv with a Master of Arts degree in International Law. He is fluent in Ukrainian, English, Russian, Spanish and French.

== Career ==
Kyslytsya started his career in international diplomacy as an intern to the Foreign Ministry of Ukraine. Over the next eight years Kyslytsya held a number of diplomacy roles, including: Special Assistant to the Deputy Minister, First Deputy Minister and then Foreign Minister of Ukraine, Head, a.i., of the Council of Europe Section, MFA, Ukraine (1994-1996); Second, First Secretary (political), Special Assistant to the Ambassador, Embassy of Ukraine to Belgium, The Netherlands and Luxembourg and Mission of Ukraine to NATO (1996-1998); contact point for WEU-Ukraine (Brussels) (1996-1998); Chief of Staff of the Minister for Foreign Affairs of Ukraine (1998-2000); Senior Adviser to the Minister for Foreign Affairs, Group of Advisers and Ambassadors at Large, MFA, Ukraine (2000-2001).

In 2001, Kyslytsya became the Political Counselor at the Embassy of Ukraine, Washington, D.C. before becoming the political Minister-Counselor at the embassy.

In 2006, Kyslytsya was appointed the Director-General for International Organizations within the Ukrainian Foreign Ministry.

Kyslytsya was appointed the Deputy Minister of Foreign Affairs of Ukraine in 2014. Kyslytsya was Deputy Minister during the Annexation of Crimea by Russia, and was involved in the international response to the annexation. In 2016, Kyslytsya was assigned the rank of Ambassador Extraordinary and Plenipotentiary.

=== Multilateral diplomacy ===
As Deputy Minister of Foreign Affairs of Ukraine he was responsible for UN affairs (2014–2020) and as Permanent Representative of Ukraine to the UN (2020–2025), he was involved in drafting 20 UN General Assembly resolutions in response to Russian aggression against Ukraine.

On March 27, 2014, the UN General Assembly adopted Resolution A/RES/68/262, “Territorial Integrity of Ukraine”, which reaffirmed Ukraine’s sovereignty and territorial integrity within its internationally recognized borders and emphasized the non-recognition of attempts to alter the status of the Autonomous Republic of Crimea and the city of Sevastopol.

Resolutions adopted by the UN General Assembly since 2014 in response to Russian aggression against Ukraine:

1. A/RES/68/262 від 27 березня 2014 «Territorial integrity of Ukraine»
2. A/RES/71/205 від 19 грудня 2016 року «Situation of human rights in the Autonomous Republic of Crimea and the city of Sevastopol (Ukraine)»
3. A/RES/72/190 від 19 грудня 2017 «Situation of human rights in the Autonomous Republic of Crimea and the city of Sevastopol, Ukraine»
4. A/RES/73/194 від 17 грудня 2018 «Problem of the militarization of the Autonomous Republic of Crimea and the city of Sevastopol, Ukraine, as well as parts of the Black Sea and the Sea of Azov»
5. A/RES/73/263 від 22 грудня 2018 «Situation of human rights in the Autonomous Republic of Crimea and the city of Sevastopol, Ukraine»
6. A/RES/74/17 від 9 грудня 2019 «Problem of the militarization of the Autonomous Republic of Crimea and the city of Sevastopol, Ukraine, as well as parts of the Black Sea and the Sea of Azov»
7. A/RES/74/168 від 18 грудня 2019 «Situation of human rights in the Autonomous Republic of Crimea and the city of Sevastopol, Ukraine»
8. A/RES/75/29 від 7 грудня 2020 року «Problem of the militarization of the Autonomous Republic of Crimea and the city of Sevastopol, Ukraine, as well as parts of the Black Sea and the Sea of Azov»
9. A/RES/75/192 від 16 грудня 2020 «Situation of human rights in the Autonomous Republic of Crimea and the city of Sevastopol, Ukraine»
10. A/RES/76/70 від 9 грудня 2021 «Problem of the militarization of the Autonomous Republic of Crimea and the city of Sevastopol, Ukraine, as well as parts of the Black Sea and the Sea of Azov»
11. A/RES/76/179 від 16 грудня 2021 «Situation of human rights in the temporarily occupied Autonomous Republic of Crimea and the city of Sevastopol, Ukraine»
12. A/RES/77/229 від 15 грудня 2022 «Situation of human rights in the temporarily occupied Autonomous Republic of Crimea and the city of Sevastopol, Ukraine»
13. A/RES/78/221 від 19 грудня 2023 «Situation of human rights in the temporarily occupied Autonomous Republic of Crimea and the city of Sevastopol, Ukraine»
14. A/RES/78/316 від 15 серпня 2024 року «Safety and security of nuclear facilities of Ukraine, including the Zaporizhzhia nuclear power plant»
15. A/RES/79/184 від 17 грудня 2024 «Situation of human rights in the temporarily occupied Autonomous Republic of Crimea and the city of Sevastopol, Ukraine»

=== International monitoring mechanisms ===
As Deputy Minister of Foreign Affairs of Ukraine, he played an active role in negotiations regarding the 2014 deployment in Ukraine of the OSCE Special Monitoring Mission and the UN Human Rights Monitoring Mission, as well as the implementation of comprehensive monitoring of the situation in the temporarily occupied Crimea by UNESCO.

The mandate of the OSCE Special Monitoring Mission (which operated from 2014 to 2021) called for observing, gathering information, establishing facts, and reporting on the security situation in Ukraine and the implementation of the Minsk Agreements.

The UN Human Rights Monitoring Mission has been operating in Ukraine since 2014 with the aim of monitoring the human rights situation and documenting human rights violations, with a particular focus on the situation in the temporarily occupied territories of Ukraine.

The Mission has published over a hundred reports containing numerous accounts of violations of human rights and international humanitarian law in Ukraine resulting from Russian aggression and the occupation of Ukrainian territory. The Mission’s monitoring findings form the basis for the UN Secretary-General’s annual reports on the situation in the occupied territories of Ukraine, including the temporarily occupied Autonomous Republic of Crimea.

Since 2014, the UNESCO Executive Board has adopted seventeen resolutions titled “Monitoring the Situation in the Autonomous Republic of Crimea (Ukraine),” pursuant to which the situation in the Autonomous Republic of Crimea and the city of Sevastopol is monitored in the Organization’s areas of responsibility, annual reports by the Director-General of UNESCO are prepared, and informational meetings are held regarding the human rights situation—in particular concerning the Crimean Tatar people, the safety of journalists, the activities of educational, scientific, and cultural institutions, as well as the preservation and protection of the national cultural, natural, and scientific heritage in the temporarily occupied Crimea.

=== Participation in peace negotiations ===
==== Geneva Meeting (2014) ====
In April 2014, he participated as part of the Ukrainian delegation in the Geneva meeting of the foreign ministers of the United States, the EU, Ukraine, and the Russian Federation. The Geneva talks resulted in a joint de-escalation plan that called for the disarmament of illegal armed groups and the return of seized territories in eastern Ukraine, as well as OSCE monitoring of the implementation of the agreements.

==== Istanbul Meetings (2025) ====
In May–July 2025, Serhiy Kyslytsia, as part of the Ukrainian delegation, participated in three meetings with the Russian delegation held in Istanbul to discuss a ceasefire and the organization of a meeting between the leaders. The only concrete outcome of these meetings was the continuation of efforts to exchange prisoners of war and the remains of the deceased.

==== Meetings in the White House (2014, 2025) ====
In March 2014, as part of the Ukrainian delegation, he participated in a meeting between Ukrainian Prime Minister A. Yatsenyuk and U.S. President B. Obama, the purpose of which was to discuss U.S. assistance aimed at halting Russia’s offensive operations in eastern Ukraine.

In August 2025, Serhiy Kyslytsia, as part of the Ukrainian delegation, took part in high-level meetings in Washington: a meeting between Ukrainian President Volodymyr Zelenskyy and U.S. President Donald Trump, as well as a meeting between the U.S. President and European leaders (Ukraine, the United Kingdom, France, Germany, Italy, Finland, the EU, and NATO) to discuss ways to end the war.

=== Promoting Equal Rights for Men and Women ===
He played an active role in developing international standards for ensuring equal rights and opportunities for women and men, and in implementing them at the national level.

From 2006 to 2011, he served as a member of the Council of Europe’s Steering Committee on Equality between Women and Men; in 2011, he was a member of the Bureau of that committee; in 2012, he served as Vice Chair of the Council of Europe’s Commission on Equality between Women and Men; and in 2014, he was elected Chair of the Commission (serving until 2016).

In 2023, he served as Chair of the Executive Board of UN Women. He is a participant in the global solidarity campaign HeForShe, which engages men in addressing gender equality issues.

As Deputy Minister of Foreign Affairs in 2019, he oversaw the conduct of a gender audit at the Ministry of Foreign Affairs of Ukraine and the implementation of its recommendations to ensure equal access to decision-making and career advancement in the diplomatic service.

On 13 February 2025 Kyslytsya was appointed the First Deputy Minister of Foreign Affairs of Ukraine.

=== Diplomacy of Memory ===
In 2025, he launched the educational project “Diplomacy of Memory,” which aims to strengthen the role of diplomacy in spreading an accurate historical narrative around the world amid Russia’s war and disinformation.

As part of the project, events were held in collaboration with the Babyn Yar National Historical and Memorial Reserve on the topics of the Holocaust and the genocide of the Roma during World War II, as well as with Peter Gelb, General Director of the Metropolitan Opera in New York, on cultural and artistic topics that shape the international discourse surrounding Ukraine.

In July 2025, Kyslytsya was awarded the Order of Merit of the 2nd class: his citation read "for significant personal contribution to strengthening international cooperation of Ukraine, many years of fruitful diplomatic activity and high professionalism."

=== Office of the President ===
On 5 January 2026 Sergiy Kyslytsya was appointed the First Deputy Head of the Office of the President of Ukraine.

In June 2026, he became an Honoured Lawyer of Ukraine: his citation read "for outstanding contributions to strengthening Ukrainian statehood, for the courage and dedication demonstrated in defending Ukraine’s sovereignty and territorial integrity, for significant personal contributions to the development of various spheres of public life, and for the conscientious fulfillment of professional duties."

== Permanent Representative of Ukraine to the UN ==
Kyslytsya was appointed to be the Permanent Representative of Ukraine to the United Nations in 2019. Kyslytsya also concurrently served as Ukraine's Ambassador to Trinidad and Tobago.

In 2021, Kyslytsya was awarded the Order of Merit of the 3rd class: his citation read "for significant personal contribution to strengthening international cooperation of Ukraine, many years of fruitful diplomatic activity and high professionalism."

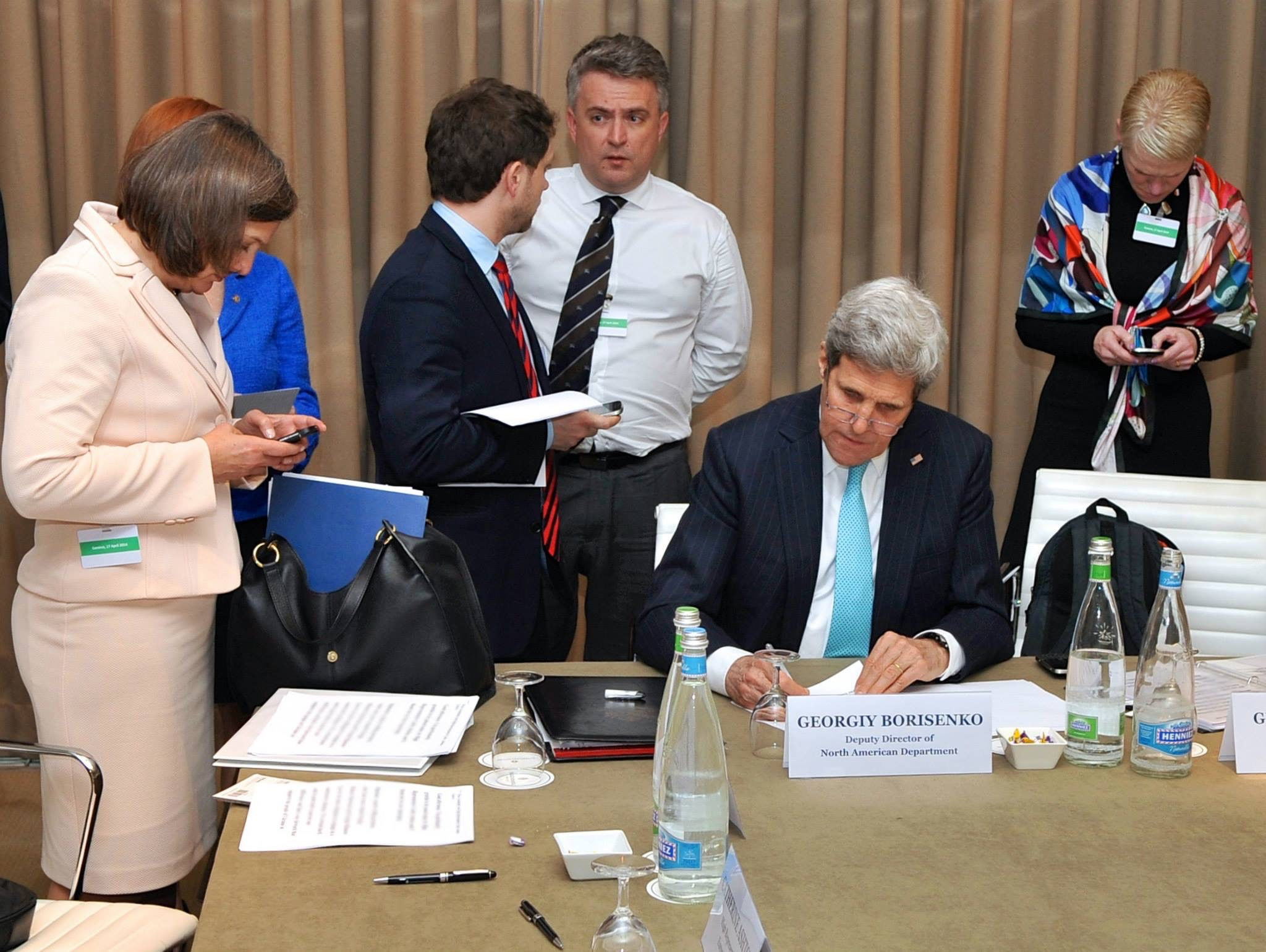
Kyslytsya at Geneva talks in 2014

=== Invasion of Ukraine in 2022 ===
In early 2022, Kyslytsya gained international media attention when he made a series of comments in relation to the 2022 Russian invasion of Ukraine, including condemnations of the Russian President Vladimir Putin and Russian Representative to the UN Vasily Nebenzya.

On 23 February 2022, President Vladimir Putin announced the invasion via video message half an hour into an emergency meeting of the Security Council meeting regarding Ukraine. After this Kyslytsya called at the meeting upon Russian Representative Vasily Nebenzya to "call Lavrov right now" and "do everything possible to stop the war." After Nebenzya had refused to do so and refused to relinquish Security Council Presidency, Kyslytsya told the Russian Representative that war criminals would not go to purgatory, but "straight to hell," which generated substantial media attention.

When questioned by a reporter about Nebenzya's assertion that the military operation in Ukraine "isn't called a war" Kyslytsya said "you want me to dissect the crazy lunatic semantics of a person whose president violates the charter, whose president declared a war and he's playing with words".

A draft resolution submitted by the United States and Albania condemning Russian aggression ultimately failed due to Russia's veto. Kyslytsya slammed the Russian actions as unjustifiable and the Russian delegation as untrustworthy.

UN General Assembly
- Addressing UN General Assembly on 28 February 2022

On 28 February, during a special session of the United Nations General Assembly, Kyslytsya said "‘If [Putin] wants to kill himself, he doesn’t need to use the nuclear arsenal. He has to do what the guy in Berlin did in a bunker in May 1945."

On 1 March, while speaking to the UN General Assembly, Kyslytsya read aloud from what was claimed to be "an actual screenshot" of the messages found on the phone of a dead Russian soldier, noting that the messages had been sent "several moments before" the soldier was killed. The messages were from the unnamed Russian to his mother and included him saying "Mama, I'm in Ukraine. There is a real war raging here. I'm afraid. We are bombing all of the cities together, even targeting civilians' and "They call us fascists. Mama, this is so hard".

Following Russia’s full-scale invasion in February 2022, as Ukraine’s Permanent Representative to the UN, I appealed to the UN Secretary-General to convene a special session of the UN General Assembly on Ukraine, during which seven resolutions regarding the war in Ukraine were adopted:

1. A/RES/ES-11/1 від 2 березня 2022 «Aggression against Ukraine»
2. A/RES/ES-11/2 від 24 березня 2022 року «Humanitarian consequences of the aggression against Ukraine»
3. A/RES/ES-11/3 від 7 квітня 2022 року «Suspension of the rights of membership of the Russian Federation in the Human Rights Council»
4. A/RES/ES-11/4 від 12 жовтня 2022 «Territorial integrity of Ukraine: defending the principles of the Charter of the United Nations»
5. A/RES/ES-11/5 від 14 листопада 2022 «Furtherance of remedy and reparation for aggression against Ukraine»
6. A/RES/ES-11/6 від 23 лютого 2023 «Principles of the Charter of the United Nations underlying a comprehensive, just and lasting peace in Ukraine»
7. A/RES/ES-11/7 від 24 лютого 2025 року «Advancing a comprehensive, just and lasting peace in Ukraine»

During his tenure as Ukraine’s Permanent Representative to the UN, he addressed the UN Security Council on 300 meetings regarding the situation in Ukraine resulting from Russian aggression.

It consistently asserts that Russia unlawfully holds a permanent seat on the UN Security Council, that it is the only country in the world to have appointed itself to that seat without following the proper procedure, and that it should be removed.

He took active steps to restrict Russia’s rights in international organizations. During his tenure as Ukraine’s Permanent Representative to the UN, the UN General Assembly suspended the Russian Federation’s rights in the UN Human Rights Council, and Russia lost its membership in the Permanent Forum on Indigenous Issues (Ukraine was elected in its place), and the Russian Federation was not elected to the Committee on Non-Governmental Organizations, the UNICEF Executive Board, or the UN Women Executive Board.

On 21 December 2024, Kyslytsya dismissed from the position during diplomatic sector rotations carried out by President Zelenskyy. He was succeeded by Khrystyna Gayovyshyn (acting).

== Diplomatic rank ==
- Ambassador Extraordinary and Plenipotentiary of Ukraine.

== Awards and honours ==
- - Order of Merit of the 3rd class (22 December 2021) - For significant personal contribution to strengthening international cooperation of Ukraine, many years of fruitful diplomatic activity and high professionalism.
- - Order of Merit of the 2nd class (20 July 2025) - For significant personal contribution to the development of interstate cooperation, the consolidation of international support for Ukraine’s sovereignty and territorial integrity, fruitful diplomatic efforts, and high level of professionalism.
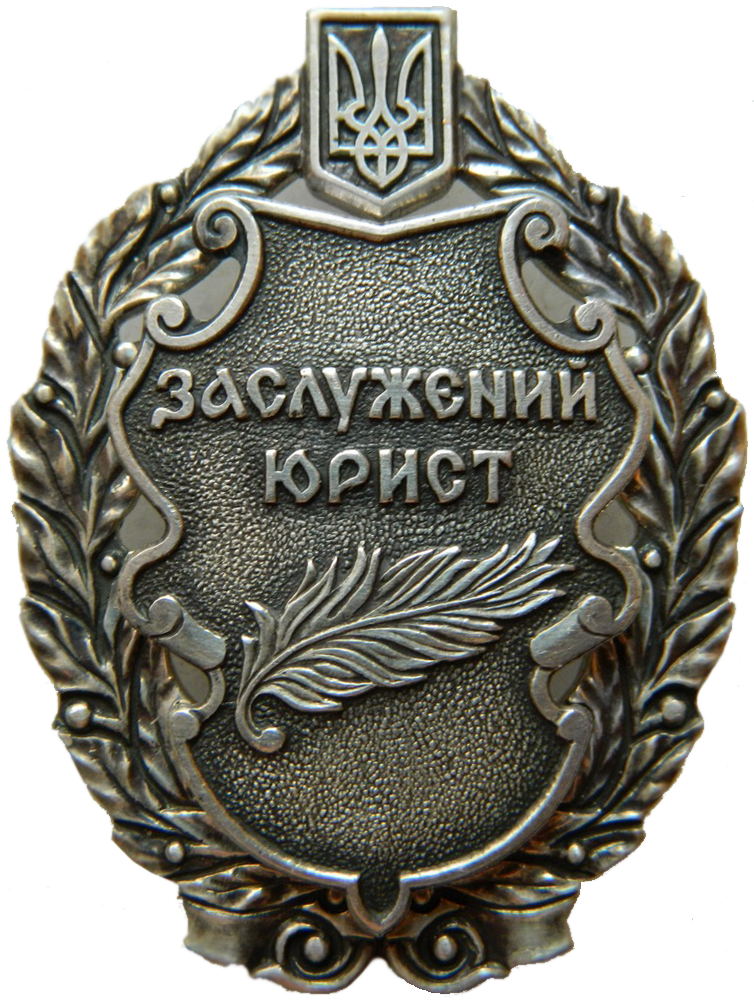
- - Honored Lawyer of Ukraine (26 June 2026) - For outstanding contributions to strengthening Ukrainian statehood, for the courage and dedication demonstrated in defending Ukraine’s sovereignty and territorial integrity, for significant personal contributions to the development of various spheres of public life, and for the conscientious fulfillment of professional duties.
