= Volodymyr Yelchenko =

Ukrainian diplomat (born 1959)

- Володимир Єльченко
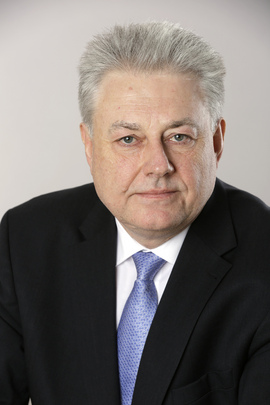
- Official portrait, 2015

Ambassador of Ukraine to the United States
- In office 19 December 2019 – 25 February 2021
- Preceded by: Valeriy Chaly
- Succeeded by: Oksana Markarova

Permanent Representative of Ukraine to the United Nations
- In office 9 December 2015 – 19 December 2019
- Preceded by: Yuriy Sergeyev
- Succeeded by: Sergiy Kyslytsya

6th Ambassador of Ukraine to Russia
- In office July 2, 2010 – March 17, 2014 (recalled for consultations)
- Preceded by: Kostyantyn Gryshchenko
- Succeeded by: Not appointed

Ambassador of Ukraine to Austria
- In office 2005–2007
- Preceded by: Yuriy Polurez
- Succeeded by: Yevhen Chornobryvko

Permanent Representative of Ukraine to the United Nations
- In office 1997–2001
- Preceded by: Anatoliy Zlenko
- Succeeded by: Valeriy Kuchynsky

Permanent Representative of Ukraine to international organizations in Vienna
- In office 2005 – 2 July 2010
- Preceded by: Yuriy Polurez
- Succeeded by: Ihor Prokopchuk

Personal details
- Born: June 27, 1959 (age 67) Kyiv, Ukrainian SSR, USSR

Volodymyr Yuriyovich Yelchenko (Ukrainian: Володимир Юрійович Єльченко; born June 27, 1959) is a Ukrainian diplomat. His latest post was the Ambassador of Ukraine to the United States, from December 2019 until February 2021. Previously to this appointment (as Ukrainian ambassador to the U.S), he was the Permanent Representative of Ukraine to the United Nations since December 9, 2015. and was formerly Ambassador of Ukraine to Russia from July 2010 until he was recalled for consultations in March 2014.

== Biography ==
Yelchenko was born in Kyiv in 1959, the son of the Minister of Culture (1971-1973) Yuriy Nykyforovych Yelchenko. Volodymyr graduated from the Faculty of International Relations and International Law at Kyiv State University in 1981. Since 1981 he has worked in the diplomatic service of Ukraine. Between 1997 and 2000 he acted as Permanent Representative of Ukraine to the United Nations in New York, US. From December 2000 till his next post he served at various senior posts within the Foreign Ministry of Ukraine. In 2005 - 2006 he was Ukraine's Ambassador to Austria, in 2006 - 2010 Mr. Yelchenko served as Permanent Representative of Ukraine to the International Organisations in Vienna, Austria. From 2010 Volodymyr Yelchenko served as Ambassador of Ukraine to the Russian Federation.

On 17 March 2014, Yelchenko was recalled from Moscow for consultations in regards to the annexation of Crimea by the Russian Federation. Ukraine's chargé d'affaires succeeded him as the highest diplomatic representation in Russia.

On December 9, 2015, Yelchenko was appointed Permanent Representative of Ukraine to the United Nations where he served until being appointed Ambassador of Ukraine to the United States on December 19, 2019.

On 25 February 2021 Ukrainian president Volodymyr Zelenskyy appointed Oksana Markarova Ambassador of Ukraine to the United States. By a decree of 25 February 2021, Zelenskyy dismissed Yelchenko from the post of ambassador to the United States, Antigua and Barbuda and Jamaica.

== See also ==
- Embassy of Ukraine in Moscow
- Embassy of Ukraine, Washington, D.C.
- Permanent Representative of Ukraine to the United Nations
