= Luka Kyzya =

Ukrainian politician (1918-1995)

- Лука Кизя

Permanent Representative of Ukraine to the United Nations
- In office 1973–1979
- Preceded by: Petro Udovychenko
- Succeeded by: Serhiy Shevchenko

Personal details
- Born: Luka Yehorovych Kyzya; February 21, 1912 Zhykhove, Novgorod-Seversky Uyezd, Chernigov Governorate, Russian Empire
- Died: December 29, 1974 (aged 62) Kyiv, Ukrainian SSR, Soviet Union
- Education: National Pedagogical Dragomanov University

Luka Yehorovych Kyzya (Ukrainian: Лука Єгорович Кизя; 21 February 1912 – 29 December 1974) was a Ukrainian Soviet-era politician, a member of the guerrillas, researcher of the history of the Soviet-German war, Doctor of Sciences, diplomat, Ambassador Extraordinary and Plenipotentiary. Permanent Representative of Ukraine to the United Nations.

== Education ==
Luka Kyzya graduated from Chernihiv Teachers' Institute (1940) and National Pedagogical Drahomanov University (1948). Doctor of Sciences in History.

== Professional career and experience ==
In 1941–1943, he was Commissioner of the guerrilla group.

From 1943 to 1944, he was commander of the guerrilla group.

From 1943 to 1944, he was Commissioner of the partisan unit.

In 1944, he worked as Secretary for the underground Rivne Regional Committee of the Communist Party of Ukraine.

In 1944–1951, he headed the Republican exhibition "Ukraine as partisans against the Nazi invaders."

From 1951 to 1956, he was Chairman of the Ukrainian Society for Cultural Relations with foreign countries, Associate Professor Taras Shevchenko National University of Kyiv.

From 1956 to 1959 - Deputy Minister of Higher and Secondary Specialized Education of the Ukrainian SSR.

From 1959 to 1960, he was senior researcher at the Institute of History of the Ukrainian SSR.

From 1960 to 1961, he headed the Department of International Organizations and was a member of the board of the Soviet Foreign Ministry.

On July 29, 1961, and 1964 - he was permanent representative of the Ukrainian Soviet Socialist Republic to the United Nations.

From 1965 to 1967 - Deputy Minister of Higher and Specialized Secondary Education.

From 1967 to 1974, he was senior researcher at the Institute of History of the Ukrainian SSR.

== Diplomatic rank ==
- Ambassador Extraordinary and Plenipotentiary
