= Volodymyr Martynenko =

Soviet and Ukrainian diplomat

- Володимир Мартиненко

Ministry of Foreign Affairs of the Ukrainian SSR
- In office 1980–1984
- Prime Minister: Oleksandr Liashko
- Preceded by: Georgiy Shevel
- Succeeded by: Volodymyr Kravets

Permanent Representative of Ukraine to the United Nations
- In office 1973–1979
- Preceded by: Mykhailo Polyanychko
- Succeeded by: Volodymyr Kravets

Personal details
- Born: Volodymyr Nykyforovych Martynenko; October 6, 1923 Gorbuliv, Cherniakhiv Raion, Volhynian Governorate, Ukrainian SSR, Soviet Union
- Died: April 18, 1988 (aged 64) Kyiv, Ukrainian SSR, Soviet Union
- Education: Taras Shevchenko National University of Kyiv

Volodymyr Nykyforovych Martynenko (Ukrainian: Володимир Никифорович Мартиненко; 6 October 1923 – 18 April 1988) was a Soviet and Ukrainian diplomat. He served as Permanent Representative of Ukraine to the United Nations. Minister of Foreign Affairs of the Ukrainian SSR.

== Early life ==
Volodymyr Martynenko graduated from Taras Shevchenko National University of Kyiv (1951).

== Career ==
From 1965–1968 he was a member of the Soviet Embassy in Canada.

From 1968–1973 he served as Deputy Minister of Foreign Affairs of the Ukrainian SSR.

From 1973–1979 he was the Permanent Representative of the Ukrainian SSR to the United Nations.

From 1979–1980 he served as Deputy Minister of Foreign Affairs of the Ukrainian SSR.

From 18 November 1980 to 28 December 1984 he was Minister of Foreign Affairs of the Ukrainian SSR.

From 1984–1988 he was a senior researcher at the Institute of History of Ukraine.

== Diplomatic rank ==
- Ambassador Extraordinary and Plenipotentiary
