= Mykhailo Polyanychko =

Ukrainian politician and diplomat (born 1921)

- Михайло Поляничко

Permanent Representative of Ukraine to the United Nations
- In office 1968–1973
- Preceded by: Serhiy Shevchenko
- Succeeded by: Volodymyr Martynenko

Personal details
- Born: Mykhailo Deonysovych Polyanychko; 1921 (age 104–105)

Mykhailo Deonysovych Polyanychko (Ukrainian: Михайло Деонисович Поляничко; born 1921) is a Ukrainian politician and diplomat, Ambassador Extraordinary and Plenipotentiary. Permanent Representative of Ukraine to the United Nations.

== Professional career and experience ==
His career was closely linked to the Ministry of Foreign Affairs, where he headed the Department of International Organizations Ministry of Foreign Affairs, was Deputy Minister of Foreign Affairs of the Ukrainian SSR. Since 1957 was a member of Ukrainian delegations to the UN General Assembly nine times. While working in Ministry of Foreign Affairs had the opportunity to meet foreign delegations visiting the Ukrainian capital Kyiv. The UN, he was elected chairman of the Eastern European Group of the United Nations, and in early 1968 acted as a spokesman for the group in an address to the UN Secretary General in the interests of East Germany, who was not a member of the United Nations.

From 1968 to 1973 – he was permanent representative of the Ukrainian Soviet Socialist Republic to the United Nations.

== Diplomatic rank ==
- Ambassador Extraordinary and Plenipotentiary
