= Victor Batiuk =

Ukrainian diplomat and poet

- Віктор Батюк

Permanent Representative of Ukraine to the United Nations
- In office 1992–1993
- Prime Minister: Leonid Kravchuk
- Preceded by: Hennadiy Udovenko
- Succeeded by: Borys Hudyma

2nd Ambassador of Ukraine to Canada
- In office 1994 – January 17, 1996
- President: Leonid Kuchma
- Preceded by: Levko Lukyanenko
- Succeeded by: Volodymyr Furkalo

Personal details
- Born: 15 March 1939 Chelyabinsk Oblast, Russian SFSR, Soviet Union
- Died: 2 December 1996 (aged 57)
- Education: Moscow State Institute of International Relations

Viktor Havrylovych Batiuk (Ukrainian: Віктор Гаврилович Батюк; 15 March 1939 – 2 December 1996) was a Ukrainian diplomat and poet, who has served as Ambassador Extraordinary and Plenipotentiary of Ukraine, and Permanent Representative of Ukraine to the United Nations. He was the only one who knew Bengali and translated Rabindranath Tagore into Ukrainian.

== Early life and education ==
Born in 1939 in Chelyabinsk Oblast, Batiuk graduated from Moscow State Institute of International Relations. He was fluent in Bengali, English, Russian and French.

== Professional career and experience ==
He worked with the Ministry of Foreign Affairs of the Ukrainian SSR participated in the translation section of the Writer's Union of Ukraine, which maintained relations with Vasyl Stus.

He worked as Second Secretary Permanent Mission of the Ukrainian SSR to the United Nations.

From 1978 to 1984, he was the Permanent Representative of Ukraine to the United Nations Office at Geneva.

From 1984 to 1992, he was the Head of Department of International Organizations, Ministry of Foreign Affairs of the Ukrainian SSR.

In 1986, he was a member of the delegation of the Ukrainian SSR at the special session of the UN General Assembly on Namibia.

In 1991, he was the Ukrainian SSR member delegation to the 46th session of the UN General Assembly.

From 1992 to 1993, he was the Permanent Representative of Ukraine to the United Nations.

From 1994 to 1996, he was the Ambassador Extraordinary and Plenipotentiary of Ukraine in Canada.

In 1996, he was killed in a car accident.

== Avtor ==
- Ukraine's non-nuclear option / Victor Batiouk by Batiuk, V. H New York : United Nations, 1992
- Poliusy : poezii / [avtor] Viktor Batiuk by Batiuk, Viktor Havrylovych Kyiv : Molod, 1971

== Diplomatic rank ==
- Ambassador Extraordinary and Plenipotentiary of Ukraine.
