= Anton Krzyzanowski =

Russian intersex activist (born 1995)

- Антон Крыжановский
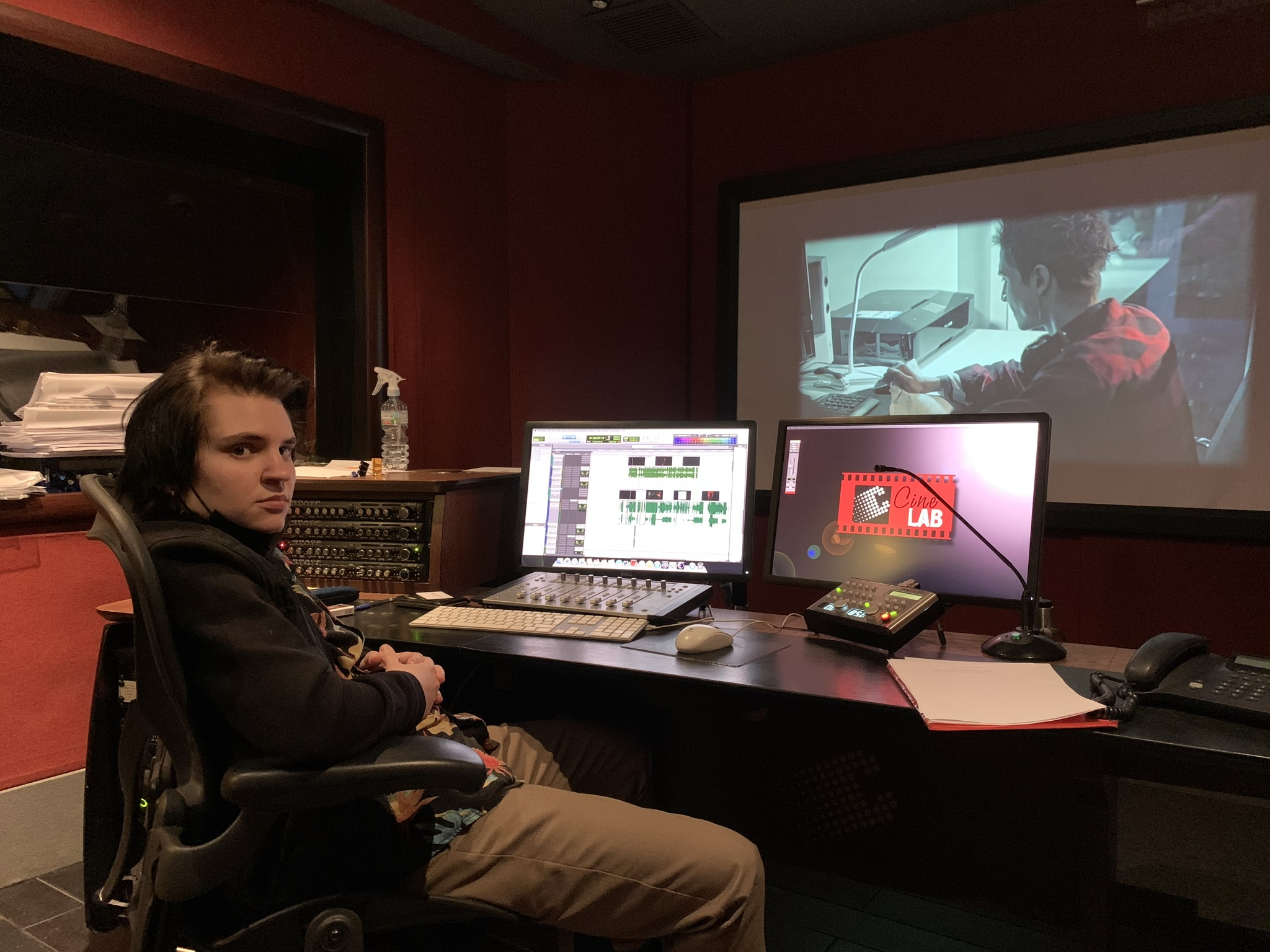
- Born: 3 March 1995 (age 31); Ural, Russia
- Occupations: intersex activist, sound designer
- Website: www.interseks.ru

Anton Krzyzanowski or Anton Kryzhanovsky (Russian: Антон Крыжановский, born 3 March 1995) is a Russian intersex activist and sound designer. He is the founder of the intersex human rights initiative group Interseks.ru (Интерсекс.ру) and is known for speaking openly about living with ovotestis.

== Early life ==
Krzyzanowski was born in a small town in Ural, Russia. He was assigned female at birth based on the appearance of his genitals but, when he was 13 years old, he went through puberty according to the male pattern. He showed male secondary sex characteristics: his voice broke, he developed facial hair, and did not start menstruating.

Because of his religious family, in 2010 Krzyzanowski was sent to a monastery as family members believed that "demons were sitting in him." Krzyzanowski has stated that he was advised to pray in order to be "cured" and become a "normal" woman. When he was 15 years old, he was sent to the hospital due to intense stomach pains; the priests suspected that it was the result of not menstruating for a long time. However, the hospital found that Krzyzanowski did not have a uterus and consequently could not have periods.

Due to the discrimination and bullying he faced for being legally designated as female despite having a male body, Krzyzanowski changed his identification documents when he was 18.

== Activism ==
Krzyzanowski is known for being the founder of the intersex human rights initiative group, "Интерсекс.ру" ("interseks.ru"). He engages in media work to promote awareness about the existence and needs of intersex people:

- Anton Krzyzanowski was one of the individuals featured in the Russian BBC documentary film about intersex people, in BBC article about Sredneuralsk Women's Monastery and in BBC article about Mizulina legislation against trans and intersex rights for marriage.
- The Belarusian website Onliner.by made a video highlighting Krzyzanowski's story.
- He was interviewed by Ksenia Sobchak in her documentary movie about Sredneuralsk Women's Monastery.
- Krzyzanowski has been interviewed by various Russian media, such as Moskovskij Komsomolets, Kommersant, and Lenta.ru.
