= Serhiy Shevchenko (diplomat) =

Ukrainian politician and diplomat

- Сергій Шевченко

Permanent Representative of Ukraine to the United Nations
- In office 1964–1968
- Preceded by: Luka Kyzya
- Succeeded by: Mykhailo Polyanychko

Personal details
- Born: October 5, 1908 Makiyivka, Donetsk region
- Died: 200? Kyiv

Serhiy Timofeyevych Shevchenko (Ukrainian: Сергій Тимофійович Шевченко) (October 5, 1908, in Makiyivka, Donetsk region – 200?, in Kyiv) was a Ukrainian politician and diplomat who served as the Permanent Representative of Ukraine to the United Nations.

== Education ==
Serhiy Shevchenko graduated from the Kharkiv Institute of National Economy, and the Institute of Red Professors in 1937.

== Professional career and experience ==
- In 1937 he was heading department of executive cadres in People's Commissariat of Education of the Ukrainian SSR.
- In 1941 - he entered military service in Red Army.
- In 194?–1946 - Deputy Chief Political Officer in the 3rd Guards Tank Army.
- In 1946 - he worked in the Kyiv Regional Committee of the Communist Party of Ukraine.
- In 1964 to 1968 - he was permanent representative of the Ukrainian Soviet Socialist Republic to the United Nations.
- In 1968, after an unsuccessful press conference to mark the 50th anniversary of the Ukrainian SSR, Sergei Shevchenko left New York City.
