= Onliner.by =

Belarusian news site

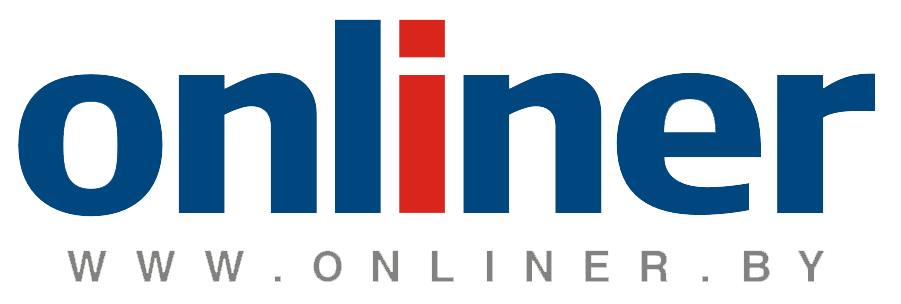
- Website type: News site Online newspaper
- Available in: Russian
- Owner: Onliner LLC
- Website: onliner.by
- Commercial: Yes
- Registration: Free
- Launched: 14 February 2001
- Current status: Active

Onliner.by (styled as Onlíner) is a Belarusian web portal, including the five main sections: technologies, auto, real estate, people, and a forum. Onliner.by also performs as a marketplace of cars, services, and consumer electronics. As of August 2015, Onliner.by was among the top 10 most visited websites in Bynet and the first created by Belarusians.

Onliner is positioned as an independent media with no financial support from the government or business. Its mission is to provide a platform for every ordinary Belarusian to speak up and deal with everyday challenges. In 2019 the site got the highest rate on being free from state propaganda among independent media. In 2021, it was announced that the Onliner will cease to publish social and political news.

Editors office follows strict non-political policy. Onliner's audience includes the biggest percent of wealthy visitors in the ByNet and over 60% of age 25-34.

Onliner received a mass media registration certificate on August 26, 2019.

== History ==
=== Blog (2001−2005) ===
The website was founded by Vitaly Shuravko in 2001 as a technology blog about telecommunications, gadget reviews, and mobile networking. With the time the blog developed into a catalog with data on gadgets, vendors and prices, later followed by a forum. Its threads separated into different topics, such as banking, car accidents, real estate, conflicts, and finances. In the future, these threads were taken as the basis for separate editors offices.

Early Onliner published articles on mobile gadgets and network development in Belarus and abroad. In 2002 Onliner was awarded Project of the Year prize at Belarus Internet Forum and its founder Vitaly Shuravko was announced Person of the Year. The site's audience reached 15,000 unique users per day. In the early 2000s, the forum was introduced. Eventually, it grew into a kind of web market where any visitor could sell, buy, or get advice on gadgets. In April 2003 the catalog of cell phones with prices and data on vendors was launched, later it was expanded and included other digital and household electronics. By the 1st of July 2003, it had more than 254,000 advertisements published.

=== Digital Lifestyle Portal (2005−2012) ===
In 2005 Onliner placed the new slogan 'Digital Lifestyle' on its homepage. In the same year the legal body was registered and Shuravko's wife Ksenia took the director's post.

In the early 2010s, Onliner functioned as a news portal inclined to entertainment, and that's why the language and layout of its articles were comparatively simple. Brief articles with lots of illustrations prevailed among the publications. However, some researchers consider media like Onliner to be a boost for the genre of long-reads and photographic reports. In the late 2000s, Onliner developed several other sections and services, including an online classified on automobile sales and real estate. By 2010 Onliner opened an independent editorial section on automobiles, in a year its audience exceeded 50,000 unique visitors daily. Early in 2011 it was followed by the real estate department, by the yearend the fourth financial section was divided. In 2011 Onliner's Twitter nearly equaled its long-time competitor Tut.by in number of followers. Through presence on social media (Facebook, Vkontakte, Odnoklassniki) Onliner accumulated additional flow of visitors and views.

=== Independent Media (2012−present) ===
In a decade the site eventually grew into an influential independent media with a news section, photo and video reports, interviews, investigative journalism, etc. In 2012 Onliner dropped the 'digital lifestyle' slogan and announced a transfer to the concept of a multisectoral news portal. By February 2013 the audience almost reached 500,000 unique users daily. According to gemiusAudience, Onliner was the first among Belarusian news media sites with an audience 1.5 times larger, than Komsomolskaya Pravda.

As of 2013, Onliner was the 9th of most visited resources among Belarusian Internet users. In 2013 the domain "online.by" was purchased at a charity auction by Onliner LLC for Br100 mln (about $8700).

In December 2014 the web site was blocked by Belarusian authorities and was removed from the national domain zone. A dozen of other sites were blocked, too, but only the Onliner's ban was officially confirmed. The official reasons given for the blockage were multiple violations of trade law, however, the independent experts linked the ban to deterioration of freedom of speech in Belarus. The site switched to Onliner.ru domain, it resumed to operate normally in January 2015. In 2015 it became the second most visited news site in Belarusian Internet.

In March 2015 the co-founders divorced, Ksenia Shuravko remained the company's director. Later that month the editor in chief of Onliner.by Denis Blisch (Russian: Денис Блищ) resigned and joined Holiday.by team. Soon he was followed by ex-director Alexander Stelmakh. Vladislav Khilkevich (Russian: Владислав Хилькевич) became the new editor-in-chief of Onliner in April 2015. A few months later Khilkevich was dismissed and Nikolai Kozlovich became the new chief editor, as of 2020 he still on duty. Kozlovich joined the Onliner team in 2011 as a journalist in the real estate department.

In August 2016 Onliner introduced the new responsive design for smartphones and desktops. The homepage featured interactive tiles with headlines and previews of articles.

In May 2017 the administration was notified on possible blockage in RuNet by Roskomnadzor. The official reason was a message on Onliner's forum that could be perceived as blasphemy. The issue was soon resolved and the site continued normal performance. In March 2018 more than 300 publications were issued daily. In 2018 Onliner was the most visited e-commerce portal in ByNet, its monthly audience reached 1.4 mln people with 11 mln pages viewed daily. By December 2019, Onliner reached 500.000 subscribers.

On June 19, 2019, the editors office received a bomb threat letter from Orwell! grouping. The same gang called in fake threats to several shopping malls and office centres. Later in the same year, the portal became the target of a significant DDoS attack.

Onliner pioneered the genre of video reports in the Belarusian Internet. In 2019 Onliner's YouTube channel had more than 375,000 subscribers, its stories on common people gained wide success and exceeded millions of views.

As of 2020, the company comprises five independent editor's offices (People, Real Estate, Auto, Technology, and Forum). In March 2020 the site exceeded 1 mln unique visitors per day.

On January 27, 2020, Onliner joined the Association of Online Commerce Enterprises (APOT). In February 2020 the company launched Onliner Pay, the new e-commerce payment system that allows users to buy directly at Onliner.by. In the same month Onliner introduced Stories.

== Sources ==
- Artsiomenko, Alena (2014). "Национальная система СМИ: спираль неэффективности" [National Media: The Spiral of Ineffectiveness]. Belarusian Yearbook (1 (eng)): 127–135.
- Astapenia, Ryhor; Balkunets, Dzmitry (2016-08-01). "Belarus-Russia Relation after the Ukraine Conflict" (PDF). Belarus Digest: Ostrogorski Centre. Minsk-London: 4–23.
- Doroshevich, Mikhail; Sokolova, Marina (2013). "Internet Management: It is time to review priorities". Belarusian Yearbook (1 (eng)): 138–145.
- Doroshevich, Mikhail; Sokolova, Marina (2012). "Развитие и использование глобальной сети интернет" [Internet Global Network: Its Development and Usage]. Belarusian Yearbook (in Russian) (1): 173–187.
- Gradushko, A. A. (2014). Жанрово-стилистические особенности новостной веб-журналистики [Genre and Stylistic Features of News Web Journalism]. Веснік МДПУ імя І. П. Шамякіна (in Russian) (3 (44)).
- Gradushko, A. A. (2019). Основы творческой деятельности веб-журналиста (PDF) (in Russian). Minsk: Belarusian State University. p. 239. ISBN 978-985-566-822-1.
- Gradushko, A. A. (2013). Современная веб-журналистика Беларуси (PDF) (in Russian). Minsk: Belarus State University. p. 179. ISBN 978-985-518-935-1.
- Gradushko, A. A. (2016). Содержательная и жанровая специфика новостных интернет-порталов Республики Беларусь [Content ang Genre Specifics of News Websites in Belarus] (PDF) (in Russian). Kazan: Kazan State University Publishing House. pp. 262–269.
- Hradziushka, A. A. (2017). "Digitalization of the Belarusian Printed Media: Models of Use of Social Media". Belarusian State University. 3 (25).
- Hradziushka, A. A.; Abdul, K. K. (2020). "Digital News Consumption in an Age of Mobile Media: Experience of Two Countries". Journal of Belarusian State University (1).
- Meleshevich, R. I. (2019). "Понятия "конвергентная редакция" и "универсальный журналист" по мнению белорусских медиаэкспертов (по материалам экспертного опроса)" [Belarusian Journalists Opinions on topics of Convergent Editorial and Universal Journalist: A Review]. Belarusian State University. 2 (225).
- Sokolova, Marina (2009). "Белорусские медиа-онлайн: аудитория, структура, законодательство и регулирование" [Belarusian Online Media: Audiences, Structure, Legislation and Regulation]. Belarusian Yearbook (in Russian) (1).
- Stepanov, Vladimir (2017-03-28). "Социальные медиа как канал дистрибуции контента для белорусских СМИ" [Social Media as a Channel to Distribute Content for Belarus Media]. Journal of the Belarusian State University. Journalism and Pedagogics (in Russian): 100–104.
