= Viktor Kryzhanivsky =

Ukrainian diplomat (1961–2021)

- Віктор Крижанівський
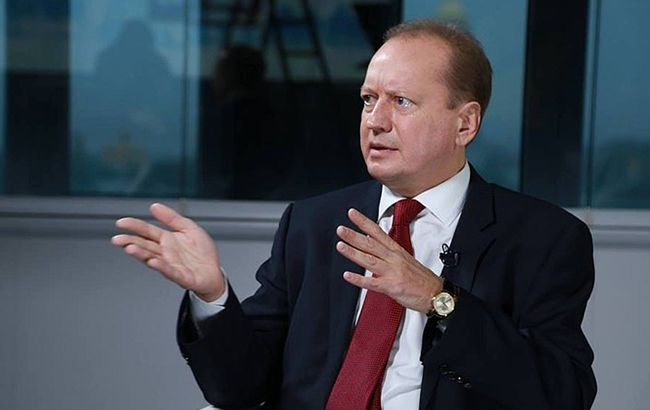
- Kryzhanivsky in 2017

Acting Permanent Representative of Ukraine to the United Nations
- In office 2006–2007
- Preceded by: Valeriy Kuchinsky
- Succeeded by: Yuriy Sergeyev

Personal details
- Born: Viktor Volodymyrovych Kryzhanivsky; 21 December 1961 Zhytomyr, Ukrainian SSR, USSR
- Died: 16 October 2021 (aged 59) Kyiv, Ukraine
- Education: Kyiv University

Viktor Kryzhanivsky (Ukrainian: Віктор Володимирович Крижанівський; 21 December 1961 – 16 October 2021) was a Ukrainian diplomat, who served as Ambassador Extraordinary and Plenipotentiary of Ukraine.

== Early life and education ==
Born in Zhytomyr, on 21 December 1961, Kryzhanivsky graduated from Taras Shevchenko National University of Kyiv, (1984). He held a Ph.D. Degree in jurisprudence from the Institute of State and Law, Academy of Sciences of Ukraine (1987). He was fluent in both English and Russian.

== Professional career and experience ==
In 1990 - He was senior economist, Head of Division Association “Ukrintour”, Kyiv. In 1990 - 1992 - Commercial Director Joint venture “Apolo”, Kyiv From 02.1992 to 12.1992 - Second, Third Secretary, Division of Conference for Security and Cooperation in Europe and Regional Cooperation, Ministry of Foreign Affairs of Ukraine. From 12.1993 to 04.1995 - Head of Division, Director, Department of Conference for Security and Cooperation in Europe and European Regional Cooperation, Ministry of Foreign Affairs of Ukraine. From 04.1995 to 06.1998 - Counsellor Permanent Mission of Ukraine to the International Organizations in Vienna. From 06.1998 to 08.1998 - Deputy Director Department of European and Transatlantic Integration, Ministry of Foreign Affairs of Ukraine. From 08.1998 to 01.1999 - Deputy Director Department of European Integration - Head of Division of NATO and Western European Cooperation, Ministry of Foreign Affairs of Ukraine. From 01.1999 to 09.2000 - Deputy Director Department of European Integration, Ministry of Foreign Affairs of Ukraine. From 09.2000 to 03.2003 - Deputy Permanent Representative of Ukraine to International Organizations in Vienna. From 03.2003 to 03.2005 - Deputy Head Main Directorate on Foreign Policy issues, Administration of the President of Ukraine. From 09.2005 to 09.2008 - Deputy Permanent Representative of Ukraine to the United Nations. From 08.2008 to 07.2010 - He was Special Envoy of Ukraine on Transnistria settlement. From 27 October 2010 - Ambassador Extraordinary and Plenipotentiary of Ukraine to Estonia.

== Death ==
Kryzhanivsky died on 16 October 2021 after an accident when he fell down a staircase in his home.

== Diplomatic rank ==
- Ambassador Extraordinary and Plenipotentiary of Ukraine.
