= Petro Udovychenko =

Ukrainian politician and historian (1914–1992)

- Петро Удовиченко

Minister of Education of Ukraine
- In office 1967–1971
- Preceded by: Alla Bondar
- Succeeded by: Oleksandr Marynych

Permanent Representative of Ukraine to the United Nations
- In office 1958–1961
- Preceded by: Luka Palamarchuk
- Succeeded by: Luka Kyzya

Personal details
- Born: 17 February 1914 Poltava region
- Died: 29 May 1992 (aged 78)
- Party: Kyiv
- Education: Pedagogical Institute of Novomoskovsk

Petro Platonovich Udovychenko (Ukrainian: Петро Платонович Удовиченко) (17 February 1914 in Poltava region – 29 May 1992 in Kyiv) he was Ukrainian politician, diplomat, Ph.D. Candidate of science in History, Professor, Academician of the National Academy of Pedagogical Sciences of Ukraine, Ambassador Extraordinary and Plenipotentiary, Permanent Representative of Ukraine to the United Nations, Minister of Education of the Ukrainian SSR.

== Education ==
Petro Udovychenko graduated from the Pedagogical Institute of Novomoskovsk (1934), Faculty of History; Higher Party School of the Central Committee (1944); Ph.D. (1947).

== Professional career and experience ==
1934-1939 – he worked as a teacher at the school Dnipropetrovsk.

1939-1941 – he was Director Tarnopolsky Teachers College.

Since 1941 he worked on the state and party work.

Since 1944 he worked in the Commissariat of Foreign Affairs of the Ukrainian SSR.

Since 1947 he lectured at Taras Shevchenko National University of Kyiv.

1948-1952 – Deputy Minister of Foreign Affairs of the Ukrainian SSR.

1952-1956 – Associate Professor of International Relations and Foreign Policy of the Ukrainian SSR.

1956-1958 – he worked as a Vice-Rector for Academic Taras Shevchenko National University of Kyiv.

March 24, 1958 - 1961 – he was permanent representative of the Ukrainian Soviet Socialist Republic to the United Nations.

1961-1967 – he headed of Department of International Relations and Foreign Policy of the Taras Shevchenko National University of Kyiv.

1967-197 – Minister of Education of the Ukrainian SSR.

1971-1984 – he was Acting professor of the history of international relations and foreign policy of the Taras Shevchenko National University of Kyiv.

== Author ==
- "History of Ukrainian SSR Foreign Policy 1919-1922" (1957).

== Diplomatic rank ==
- Ambassador Extraordinary and Plenipotentiary
