= Zinaida Nevzorova =

Russian revolutionary (1869–1948)

- Зинаида Невзорова
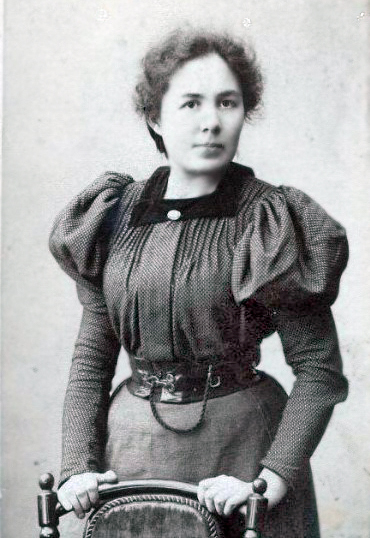
- Nevzorova in 1898
- Born: Zinaida Pavlovna Nevzorova; 23 August 1869; Nizhny Novgorod, Russian Empire
- Died: 24 April 1948 (aged 78); Moscow, Soviet Union
- Resting place: Novodevichy Cemetery
- Other name: Zinaida Krzhizhanovskaya
- Education: Bestuzhev Courses
- Occupation: Teacher
- Years active: 1895–1933
- Political party: Russian Social Democratic Labour Party (Bolsheviks)
- Spouse: Gleb Krzhizhanovsky (m. 1899–1948)

Zinaida Pavlovna Nevzorova (Russian: Зинаида Павловна Невзорова; 23 August 1869 – 24 April 1948), also known by her married name Zinaida Krzhizhanovskaya (Russian: Зинаида Кржижановская), was a Russian revolutionary socialist and teacher. A socialist from a young age, she came into contact with other activists while studying at the Bestuzhev Courses and joined the League of Struggle for the Emancipation of the Working Class. She was arrested and exiled to Siberia, where she married fellow socialist Gleb Krzhizhanovsky. She later joined the Russian Social Democratic Labour Party, worked for its newspaper Iskra and organised a women's group in Moscow. After the Russian Revolution of 1917, she worked in the People's Commissariat for Education.

== Biography ==
Zinaida Pavlovna Nevzorova was born in Nizhny Novgorod, on 23 August [O.S. 11 August] 1869. She was the daughter of a teacher, a former government official who had been banished in the 1860s. She also had two sisters, Avgusta and Sofia. She and her sisters became social democrats at a young age, and joined a local socialist circle. Zinaida was educated at the Mariinsky Women's Institute in Nizhny Novgorod, and went on to study chemistry at the Bestuzhev Courses in Saint Petersburg. While studying there, she became friends with the socialist activists Olga Ulyanova, Apollinariya Yakubova and Nadezhda Krupskaya.

After graduating in 1894, Nevzorova and Krupskaya taught workers at night schools and Sunday schools, and conducted revolutionary socialist propaganda work. The following year, she joined the League of Struggle for the Emancipation of the Working Class. Within the League, she was known by the pseudonym "Bulochkin" (English: bread roll). She held secret socialist meetings at her apartment, where their group listened to Vladimir Lenin speak and where she met fellow League member Gleb Krzhizhanovsky. She also managed the group's funds, making her an integral part of the socialist movement in the capital. She kept the funds in her own home, as she believed using a bank would be "un-Marxist". She briefly returned to Nizhny Novgorod and attempted to purchase gelatine for a hectograph, which brought her under close police surveillance. She was blacklisted from teaching after returning to Saint Petersburg.

In 1896, she was arrested and exiled to Siberia. She entered into a marriage of convenience with Krzhizhanovsky, who had also been arrested, so their group could remain together. This arrangement developed into a genuine romantic relationship. In exile in Minusinsk, they studied Das Kapital and corrected the Russian translation they were reading. The couple then became members of the nascent Russian Social Democratic Labour Party (RSDLP).

Between 1900 and 1905, Nevzorova worked for the RSDLP newspaper Iskra. She was one of five women who worked on the paper, out of twelve main contributors. She became the secretary for the paper's central bureau. She later joined the paper's Bolshevik faction, and in 1904, she took part in meetings with Anna Ulyanova in Saint Petersburg, Zurich, Saratov and Kyiv. Nevzorova was active in the Russian Revolution of 1905 in Saint Petersburg. In 1906, she was a contributor to the magazine Volny. In 1912, she and her sister Sofia organised the Third Moscow Women's Club and oversaw its cultural and educational activities until the following year, when it was raided by police and forced to shut down.

After the February Revolution of 1917, she began working for the Moscow City Soviet. After the October Revolution and the establishment of the Russian Soviet Republic, she became deputy head of the extracurricular department in the People's Commissariat for Education and deputy chair of the Main Political and Educational Committee. She later worked for the Communist Academy. She lived in Moscow for the rest of her life. In 1933, she and her sister co-wrote a memoir about their experiences in the Bolshevik Party and the Moscow Women's Club. She died on 24 April 1948, and her body was buried in the Novodevichy Cemetery. The manuscript of her memoirs is kept in the Historical and Architectural Museum of Nizhny Novgorod. A street in Nizhny Novgorod was named after her and her sisters.

== Bibliography ==
- Baev, Sergey. "Невзорова-Кржижановская Зинаида Павловна" [Nevzorova-Krzhizhanovskaya Zinaida Pavlovna]. Нижегородская Биографическая Энциклопедия (in Russian).
- Gorbunov, Yurii Alekseevich. "КРЖИЖАНОВСКАЯ, Зинаида Павловна" [Krzhizhanovskaya, Zinaida Pavlovna]. Писательницы России: материалы для биобиблиографического словаря (in Russian). Sverdlovsk Oblast Universal Scientific Library.
- Hamilton-Dann, Mary (1998). Vladimir and Nadya: The Lenin Story. International Publishers. ISBN 9780717807123.
- Hillyar, Anna; McDermid, Jane (2000). Revolutionary Women in Russia, 1870-1917: A Study in Collective Biography. Manchester University Press. ISBN 9780719048388.
- Turton, Katy (2018). Family Networks and the Russian Revolutionary Movement, 1870–1940. Palgrave Macmillan. ISBN 978-0-230-39307-3.
- White, James D. (2001). "The Making of A Revolutionary". Lenin: The Practice and Theory of Revolution. Red Globe Press London. pp. 13–39. doi:10.1007/978-0-333-98537-3_2. ISBN 978-0-333-98537-3.
- Young, James Peter (2008). Bolshevik Wives: A Study of Soviet Elite Society (PhD). Sydney University.
