= Hennadiy Udovenko =

Ukrainian politician and diplomat

- Геннадій Удовенко
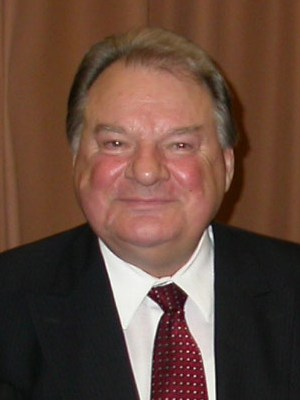
- Udovenko in 2007

2nd Minister of Foreign Affairs
- In office 5 August 1994 – 17 April 1998
- President: Leonid Kuchma
- Preceded by: Anatoliy Zlenko
- Succeeded by: Borys Tarasyuk

People's Deputy of Ukraine
- In office 29 March 1998 – 23 November 2007
- Constituency: People's Movement of Ukraine, No. 3 (1998–2002); Our Ukraine Bloc, No. 3 (2002–2006); Our Ukraine Bloc, No. 31 (2006–2007)

President of the United Nations General Assembly
- In office 16 September 1997 – 8 September 1998
- Preceded by: Razali Ismail
- Succeeded by: Didier Opertti

Personal details
- Born: 22 June 1931 Kryvyi Rih, Ukrainian SSR, Soviet Union (now Ukraine)
- Died: 12 February 2013 (aged 81) Kyiv, Ukraine
- Party: People's Movement of Ukraine
- Other political affiliations: Our Ukraine–People's Self-Defense Bloc
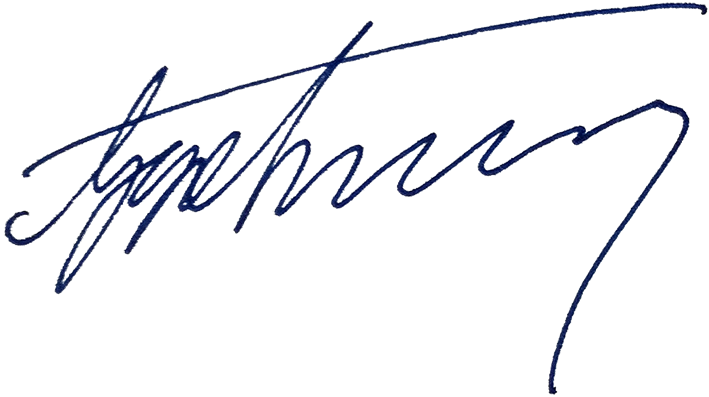
- Signature

Hennadiy Yosypovych Udovenko (Ukrainian: Геннадій Йосипович Удовенко; 22 June 1931 – 12 February 2013) was a Ukrainian politician and diplomat. He served as the Minister of Foreign Affairs of Ukraine, was the 52nd President of the United Nations General Assembly (1997–1998) and a People's Deputy of Ukraine (1998–2007). He was from Dnipropetrovsk Oblast. He studied international relations at Kyiv University, having graduated in 1954. He also did graduate studies in agricultural economics at the Ukrainian Research and the Development Institute for Agricultural Economy and Organization from 1956 to 1959.

== Early life and career ==
Udovenko began his career in 1952 as secretary to the Minister and secretary to the Governing Board of the Ministry of the building materials industry of the Ukrainian Soviet Socialist Republic. From 1955 to 1958, he was head of the collective farm in the Domantivka village of the Skvyra district of the Kyiv region.

== Diplomatic career ==
Udovenko entered diplomatic service in 1959 as 1st secretary, counsellor at the Department of International Economic organizations of the Ministry of Foreign Affairs of the Ukrainian Soviet Socialist Republic. In 1965–71, he worked at the United Nations Office in Geneva, Switzerland. Between 1971 and 1977, he was successively head of the personnel department and head of the International economic organizations department of the Ministry of Foreign Affairs of the Ukrainian SSR.

From 1977 to 1980, he was director of the Interpretation and Meetings Division at the Department of Conference Services of the United Nations office in New York City.

In 1980–1985, he was Deputy Minister of Foreign Affairs of the Ukrainian Soviet Socialist Republic, and was assigned the rank of ambassador extraordinary and plenipotentiary in January 1985.

From February 1985 to March 1992, he was Permanent Representative of Ukraine to the United Nations and vice-chairman of the United Nations Special Committee against Apartheid. 1989–1991 – vice-president of the Economic and Social Council of the United Nations. At the same time, in 1991–1992, he was Deputy Foreign Minister of Ukraine. In 1992–1994, he served as ambassador of Ukraine to Poland.

From 1994 until 1998, he was Minister of Foreign Affairs of Ukraine and member of the National Security and Defense Council of Ukraine. In September 1997, he was elected president of the 52nd Session of the United Nations General Assembly for one year, continuing as president of the 10th emergency special and 20th special sessions of the UN GA.

== Political activities ==
On 14 May 1999, Udovenko was elected chairman of the People's Movement of Ukraine (Rukh) political party, having served as acting chairman since the end of March 1999, when the previous chairman of Rukh, Viacheslav Chornovil, had died in a car accident. He was reelected in 2001 and served as chairman of the party until May 3, 2003, having been succeeded by Borys Tarasyuk who had earlier also succeeded him as Ukraine's foreign minister.

As member of Rukh, he was elected to the Verkhovna Rada, the Parliament of Ukraine, in 1998. In the spring of 1999 the parliamentary faction of Rukh did split up in 2 different factions and the breakaway faction was led by Udovenko.

In 2002, he again became Member of Parliament as part of the electoral list of Our Ukraine bloc, which had been created with active cooperation on the part of Udovenko. During the 3rd and 4th convocations of the Verkhovna Rada, he was chairman of the Parliamentary Committee on Human Rights, National Minorities and Inter-ethnic Relations.

In the 2006 parliamentary elections, he was again part of the Our Ukraine list, but declined laying down his parliamentary mandate during the political crisis in the spring of 2007, when more than 150 MPs from Our Ukraine and Yulia Tymoshenko Bloc resigned from the parliament, giving the president the legal grounds for dissolving the Verkhovna Rada. Aged 76, Udovenko chose not to participate in the new elections.

== Death and legacy ==
Udovenko died in a Kyiv hospital on 12 February 2013; the cause of death was not publicly revealed. Udovenko had been hospitalized at the same hospital in early February 2013.

In 2017, the Diplomatic Academy of Ukraine at the Ministry of Foreign Affairs of Ukraine was named after Hennadiy Udovenko. This adult life-learning postgraduate institution is dedicated to the training and continuous professional education of diplomats and public servants engaged in foreign relationships.

Diplomatic posts
Preceded by Razali Ismail	President of the United Nations General Assembly; 1997–1998	Succeeded by Didier Opertti
