= Anatoliy Zlenko =

Ukrainian diplomat (1938–2021)

- Анатолій Зленко
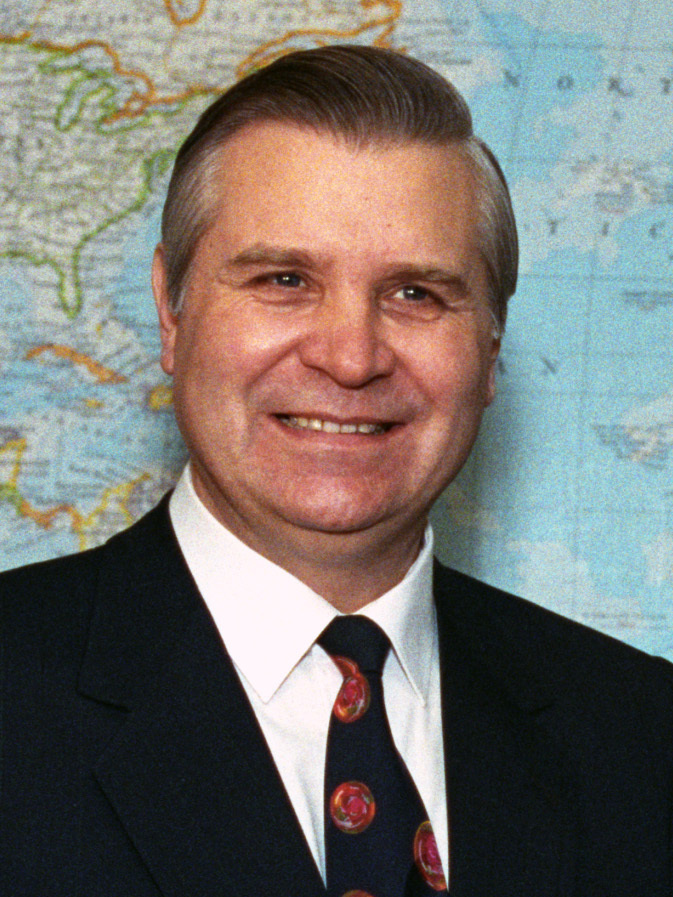
- Zlenko in 1993

Minister of Foreign Affairs of Ukraine
- In office 2 October 2000 – 2 September 2003
- Preceded by: Oleksandr Chalyi
- Succeeded by: Kostyantyn Gryshchenko
- In office 24 August 1991 – 25 August 1994
- Preceded by: Position established (Himself as Minister of Foreign Affairs of the Ukrainian SSR)
- Succeeded by: Hennadiy Udovenko

Minister of Foreign Affairs of the Ukrainian SSR
- In office 27 July 1990 – 24 August 1991
- Preceded by: Volodymyr Kravets
- Succeeded by: Position abolished (Himself as Minister of Foreign Affairs of Ukraine)

Personal details
- Born: 2 June 1938 Stavyshche, Ukrainian SSR, Soviet Union (now Ukraine)
- Died: 1 March 2021 (aged 82)

Anatoliy Maksymovych Zlenko (Ukrainian: Анато́лій Макси́мович Зле́нко; 2 June 1938 – 1 March 2021) was a Ukrainian diplomat. He served as Ukraine's first Foreign Minister from 1990 to 1994 and again from 2000 to 2003. Zlenko was previously the Permanent Representative of Ukraine to the United Nations from 1994 to 1997.

== Early life and career ==
Born 2 June 1938, in the village Stavyshche, Kyiv Oblast, Zlenko graduated from Kyiv mining college in 1959, and was made mining master of the "Maksymivka-Pologa" mine, located in Kadiivka (at the time the city was named Serho/Sergo). In 1967 Zlenko graduated from Kyiv University, and was subsequently made a diplomatic attache for the Ministry of Foreign Affairs of the USSR.

In 1973, Zlenko became a staff member of the Secretariat of UNESCO in Paris. He subsequently became the permanent representative of the USSR to UNESCO in October 1983. In April 1987, he became a Deputy of the Minister of Foreign Affairs of Ukraine and subsequently became the First Deputy for a year, between July 1989 and July 1990.

== Minister of Foreign Affairs ==
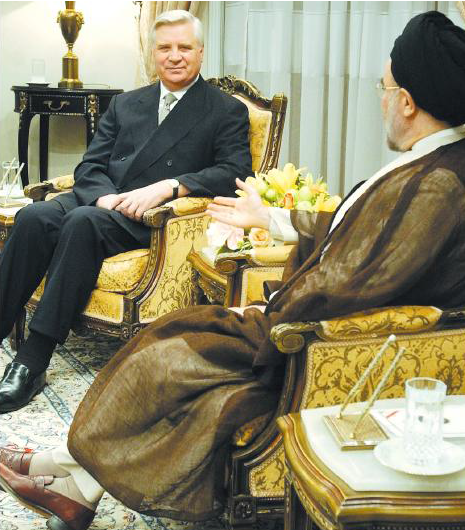
Zlenko as Minister of Foreign Affairs with the Iranian President Mohammad Khatami on 19 July 2003

In 1990, Zlenko became the first Foreign Minister of the newly independent Ukraine. He strongly promoted Ukraine's relations with Western Europe. In an interview in 1990, Zlenko said:

"A common history existing a thousand years and a deep cultural, linguistic and ideological closeness have linked us with neighboring Poland. The western regions of Ukraine and the eastern provinces of Poland...are similar in make-up of population and economy...Our border with Czechoslovakia, Hungary and Romania is shorter than that with Poland. But there are also ethnic...influences, economic ties, trade, mixed marriages, the common Danube waters..."

His first term concluded in September 1994, and he became the Permanent Representative of Ukraine to the United Nations until September 1997, subsequently serving as the Ukrainian Ambassador to France until 2000, in which capacity he returned to his former position as Ukrainian Representative to UNESCO (in November 1998 he also was appointed Ukrainian Ambassador to Portugal). He subsequently returned to his position as Minister of Foreign affairs, until retiring in 2003.

In 2010, Zlenko was appointed dean of the Faculty of International Relations of Kyiv Slavic University.
