= Embassy of Ukraine, Beijing =

Diplomatic mission of Ukraine to China

Embassy of Ukraine in Beijing Ukrainian: Посольство України в КНР Chinese: 烏克蘭駐華大使館
- Map of Ukrainian diplomatic missions in People's Republic of China

- Location within Beijing Location within China
- Location: Chaoyang District, Beijing, China
- Address: 11 E. 6th Street, Chaoyang District, Beijing
- Coordinates: 39°56′38″N 116°27′03″E
- Ambassador: Pavlo Riabikin
- Website: china.mfa.gov.ua/zh

The Embassy of Ukraine in Beijing (Ukrainian: Посольство України в КНР, Chinese: 烏克蘭駐華大使館) is the diplomatic mission of Ukraine to China. It is located at 11 East 6th Street, Chaoyang District, Beijing.

== Background ==
Following Ukrainian independence, the People's Republic of China recognized Ukraine on December 27, 1991, and both nations began diplomatic relations on January 4, 1992. On December 4, 1993, Ukraine officially held an opening ceremony of its embassy in Beijing.

== List of Ambassadors ==
- 1993–1998 – Anatoliy Pliushko
- 1998–1999 – Pavlo Sultansky (provisional)
- 1999–2001 – Ihor Lytvyn
- 2001–2003 – Mykhailo Reznik
- 2004–2009 – Serhii Kamyshev
- 2009–2012 – Yurii V. Kostenko
- 2012–2013 – Vasyl Hamyanin (provisional)
- 2013–2019 – Oleh Dyomin
- 2019–2021 – Serhii Kamyshev
- 2021–2023 – Zhanna Leshchynska (provisional)
- 2023–2024 – Pavlo Riabikin
- 2025–incumbent – Olexander Nechytaylo

== See also ==
- Embassy of China, Kyiv
- China-Ukraine relations
- Consulate of Ukraine, Shanghai
- Consulate of Ukraine, Guangzhou
