= List of ambassadors of Ukraine to China =

Ukraine Ambassadors To China

Ambassador of Ukraine to China

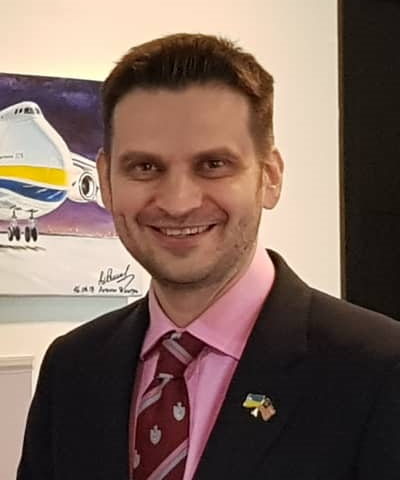
- Incumbent; Olexander Nechytaylo since 2025
- Reports to: President of Ukraine
- Nominator: Volodymyr Zelenskyy
- Inaugural holder: Anatoliy Pliushko as Ambassador Extraordinary and Plenipotentiary
- Formation: 1993
- Website: Ukraine Embassy

The Ambassador Extraordinary and Plenipotentiary of Ukraine to the People's Republic of China (Ukrainian: Надзвичайний і Повноважний посол України в Китайські Народні Республіці) is the ambassador of Ukraine to China.

The first Ukrainian ambassador to China assumed his post in 1993, the same year a Ukrainian embassy opened in Beijing.

== List of representatives ==
- 1993–1998 – Anatoliy Pliushko
- 1998–1999 – Pavlo Sultansky (provisional)
- 1999–2001 – Ihor Lytvyn
- 2001–2003 – Mykhailo Reznik
- 2004–2009 – Serhii Kamyshev
- 2009–2012 – Yurii V. Kostenko
- 2012–2013 – Vasyl Hamyanin (provisional)
- 2013–2019 – Oleh Dyomin
- 2019–2021 – Serhii Kamyshev
- 2021–2023 – Zhanna Leshchynska (provisional)
- 2023–2024 – Pavlo Riabikin
- 2025–incumbent – Olexander Nechytaylo

== See also ==
- Embassy of Ukraine, Beijing
- Embassy of China, Kyiv
- China-Ukraine relations
- Foreign relations of China
- Foreign relations of Ukraine
- List of diplomatic missions in Ukraine
- List of diplomatic missions of China
