= Embassy of Ukraine, Seoul =

Diplomatic mission in South Korea

Embassy of Ukraine in Seoul Ukrainian: Посольство України в Республіці Корея Korean: 주한 우크라이나 대사관
- Location: Itaewon, Yongsan District, Seoul, South Korea
- Address: 21 45th St., Itaewon, Yongsan District, Seoul
- Coordinates: 37°32′09″N 126°59′57″E
- Ambassador: Oleksandr Horin
- Website: korea.mfa.gov.ua/en

- Embassy of Ukraine, Seoul
- Hangul: 주한 우크라이나 대사관
- Hanja: 駐韓우크라이나大使館
- RR: Juhan Ukeuraina daesagwan
- MR: Chuhan Uk'ŭraina taesagwan

Embassy of Ukraine in Seoul (Ukrainian: Посольство України в Республіці Корея；Korean: 주한 우크라이나 대사관) is the official diplomatic mission of Ukraine in South Korea. The embassy is located at 21 45th St., Itaewon, Yongsan District, Seoul, South Korea. The embassy was officially established in 1997, following Ukrainian independence in 1991 and the establishment of relations between the nations in 1992. The original embassy was located in Seocho District, but has relocated twice before being where it is today.

== History ==
Ukraine became independent on August 24, 1991, after the Dissolution of the Soviet Union, and was recognized by South Korea about four months later. The two nations then established relations in February 1992 through the signing of a declaration of recognition.

After the establishment of the Embassy of South Korea in Kyiv, the Ukrainians first appointed Korean entrepreneur Ho-Sang Wang(왕호상) as the honorary ambassador, who was in charge of the diplomatic affairs of the two nations. Later in October 1997, Ukraine officially established their embassy in Seoul, and appointed Mykhailo Reznik as the first ambassador.

The embassy was located at Seocho-dong (외교센터) when it first opened. In December 2002, it relocated to Dongbinggo-dong. In January 2015, the embassy once again relocated to its current location in Itaewon.

In 2012, the embassy celebrated the 20th anniversary of its opening, and coordinated some cross-cultural events, including a celebration of Ukrainian independence on August 24.

== Responsibilities ==
The head of the embassy is the ambassador, and there are consulates under the embassy to divide up bureaucratic duties. The embassy is responsible for diplomatic discussions on topics like trade and economic cooperation, technological innovations, legal responsibilities, and cultural exchange.

Besides the main embassy, the Ukrainian delegation also has an honorary consulate in Seoul. Its office is located in Mapo District, and its consular district encompasses the provinces of North Gyeongsang, South Gyeongsang, North Jeolla, South Jeolla, Jeju Island, along with the cities of Seoul, Busan, Daegu, Ulsan, and Gwangju.

== List of ambassadors ==
List of Ukrainian ambassadors to South Korea
Romanized Name	Original Name	Duration of Service	Position
Mykhailo Reznik	Михайло Резнік	September 1997 – October 2001	Ambassador
Volodymyr Furkalo	Володимир Фуркало	November 2001 – March 2005	Ambassador
Yuriy Mushka	Юрій Мушка	May 2006 – September 2008	Ambassador
Volodymyr Bielashov	Володимир Бєлашов	September 2008 – May 2011	Ambassador
Vasyl Marmazov	Василь Мармазов	September 2011 – June 2017	Ambassador
Oleksandr Horin	Олександр Горін	June 2017 – Present	Ambassador

== See also ==
- South Korea–Ukraine relations
- Embassy of South Korea, Kyiv
- List of diplomatic missions of Ukraine
- List of diplomatic missions in South Korea
- Koreans in Ukraine
