= Embassy of Ukraine, Moscow =

Diplomatic mission of Ukraine to Russia

Embassy of Ukraine in Russia Посольство України в Росії
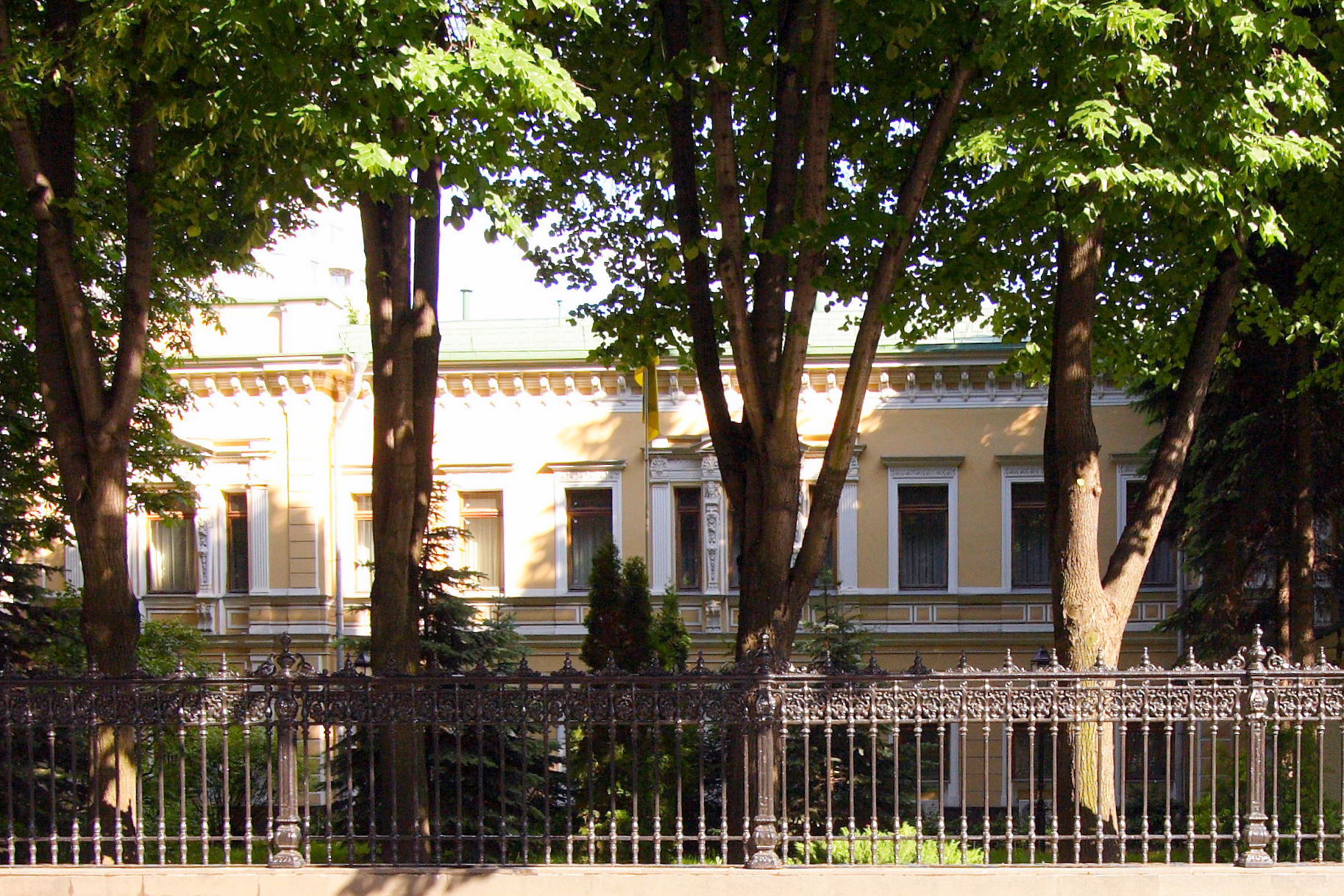
- Location: Moscow, Russia
- Address: 125009 Leontyevsky Lane, 18
- Coordinates: 55.7606°N 37.6057°E
- Ambassador: Post vacant since March 2014; Relations terminated on 24 February 2022

The Embassy of Ukraine in Moscow was the chief diplomatic mission of Ukraine in the Russian Federation. It was located at 18 Leontyevsky Lane (Russian: Леонтьевский переулок, 18) in Moscow.

In March 2014, as a result of Russia's annexation of Crimea, Ukraine recalled its ambassador and Ukraine was represented by its temporary chargé d'affaires until the start of the Russian invasion of Ukraine on 24 February 2022. Ukraine severed diplomatic relations with Russia and evacuated its entire embassy personnel from Moscow that day. The embassy's personnel were officially welcomed to the Latvian capital, Riga, on 4 March.

== Ambassadors ==
- 1992–94 – Volodymyr Kryzhanivsky (Володимир Крижанівський)
- 1995–99 – Volodymyr G. Fedorov (Володимир Федоров)
- 1999–2005 – Mykola Biloblotsky (Микола Білоблоцький)
- 2005–06 – Leonid Osavolyuk (Леонід Осаволюк), Chargé d'Affaires ad interim
- 2006–08 – Oleh Dyomin (Олег Дьомін)
- 2008–10 – Kostyantyn Gryshchenko (Костянтин Грищенко)
- 2010–14 – Volodymyr Yelchenko (Володимир Єльченко)
- 2015–19 – Ruslan Nimchynskyy (Руслан Німчинський), Chargé d'Affaires ad interim
- 2019–22 – Vasyl Pokotylo (Василь Покотило), Chargé d'Affaires ad interim

== See also ==
- Russia–Ukraine relations
- Diplomatic missions in Russia
- Diplomatic missions of Ukraine
- Embassy of Russia in Kyiv
