= North Korea–Ukraine relations =

- North Korea: Ukraine

Bilateral relations between the DPRK and Ukraine were severed in July 2022 due to North Korea's recognition of the separatist Donetsk People's Republic and Luhansk People's Republic in eastern Ukraine. The two countries had burgeoning trade as well as technical relations prior to the direct involvement of the DPRK in the Russo-Ukrainian war against Ukraine.

== History ==
Bilateral relations were established on January 9, 1992. The North Korean embassy in Moscow was also accredited to Ukraine. Ukraine was accredited to North Korea through its embassy in Beijing. In 1998, North Korea closed its embassy in Kyiv (as well as several other embassies) due to the country's severely reduced budget after the collapse of the Eastern Bloc.

Before the 2022 Russian invasion of Ukraine, Ukrainian scientists and businessmen assisted North Korea's nuclear program by either working directly or supplying technology to the country.

=== Russo-Ukrainian war ===
In 2017, North Korea recognised Crimea as part of Russia. Due to this happening at a time where bilateral relations between North Korea and the United States were thawing, Ukraine did not respond strongly.

==== After Russian invasion of Ukraine ====
On July 13, 2022, Ukraine announced the severance of diplomatic relations with North Korea due to its recognition of the independence of the separatist Donetsk and Luhansk People's Republics. Prior to the severance of diplomatic relations, other political and economic relations had already been frozen due to the sanctions imposed against North Korea.

In October 2024, reports emerged that North Korean soldiers were being trained in Russia's far east, confirming earlier claims by South Korea’s National Intelligence Service (NIS) that 1,500 North Korean troops had been sent for military training, potentially to be deployed in Ukraine. The soldiers were filmed receiving uniforms and equipment at a training ground, and additional footage showed their arrival near Russia’s border with China.

On 23 October, U.S. Defense Secretary Lloyd Austin confirmed the presence of North Korean troops in Russia, marking a significant escalation in the Russia-Ukraine conflict. Ukrainian President Volodymyr Zelenskyy also stated that two units of North Korean soldiers, each with 6,000 personnel, were being trained for deployment.

On 28 October, NATO Secretary-General Mark Rutte confirmed that North Korean troops were bordering Ukraine, marking NATO’s first formal acknowledgment of North Korean forces actively supporting Russia. NATO leaders and Zelenskyy called for international pressure on Russia and North Korea to adhere to UN mandates.

On 4 November, Ukrainian officials claimed direct military engagement with North Korean soldiers deployed by Russia in the Kursk region, if confirmed it would marking the first instance of foreign military intervention since Russia’s 2022 full-scale invasion of Ukraine. Andriy Kovalenko, Ukraine’s counter-disinformation official, claimed that North Korean troops stationed near Kursk came under Ukrainian fire.

On 27 February 2025, Russian President Vladimir Putin met with Ri Hi Yong, a senior North Korean official, in Moscow to discuss their strategic partnership. North Korea has reportedly deployed thousands of troops to support Russian forces, according to Ukrainian, U.S., and South Korean assessments.

In November 2025, Ukrainian media, citing pro-war Russian bloggers and telegram channels, stated that North Korean soldiers have allegedly arrived in Ukraine’s Zaporizhzhia region and may be preparing to fight near the town of Huliaipole. However, Ukrainian officials and Western intelligence agencies, which have confirmed North Korean involvement against Ukrainian forces inside Russia, have not confirmed the presence of North Korean troops in Ukraine itself. With the DPRK closely aligning itself with Russia, Ukraine has sought to build stronger partnerships with their rivals Japan and South Korea.

== Trade ==
In 2020, Ukraine exported US$7,710 to North Korea. On the other hand, North Korea exported $55,500 to Ukraine, with its main exports being mostly polyacetals.

== See also ==
- Foreign relations of North Korea
- Foreign relations of Ukraine
- Koreans in Ukraine
- North Korea–Russia relations
- South Korea–Ukraine relations

== Bibliography ==
- Wertz, Daniel; Oh, JJ; Insung, Kim (2016). "DPRK Diplomatic Relations" (PDF). NCNK.
