= Embassy of South Korea, Kyiv =

Official diplomatic mission of South Korea in Ukraine

Embassy of South Korea in Kyiv Korean: 주우크라이나 대한민국 대사관 Ukrainian: Посольство Республіки Корея в Україні
- Location: Kyiv, Ukraine
- Address: 12 Striletska St., Kyiv
- Coordinates: 50°27′12″N 30°30′42″E
- Opened: 1992
- Ambassador: Park Ki-Chang
- Website: ukr.mofat.go.kr/worldlanguage/europe/ukr/main/index.jsp

Embassy of South Korea in Kyiv (Korean: 주우크라이나 대한민국 대사관; Ukrainian: Посольство Республіки Корея в Україні) is the official diplomatic mission of the Republic of Korea in Ukraine. The embassy is located at 12 Striletska St., Kyiv. The embassy was officially established in 1992, following Ukrainian independence in 1991 and the establishment of relations between the nations in 1992.

== History ==
After Ukraine declared independence on August 24, 1991, South Korea recognized Ukraine on December 30, 1991. On February 10, 1992, diplomatic relations were established between the two nations.

On Friday, January 31, 2025, South Korea declared new ambassadors to 11 different countries including the Ukraine ambassador. As well South Korea appointed a new role for a Cuban ambassador.

== List of Ambassadors ==
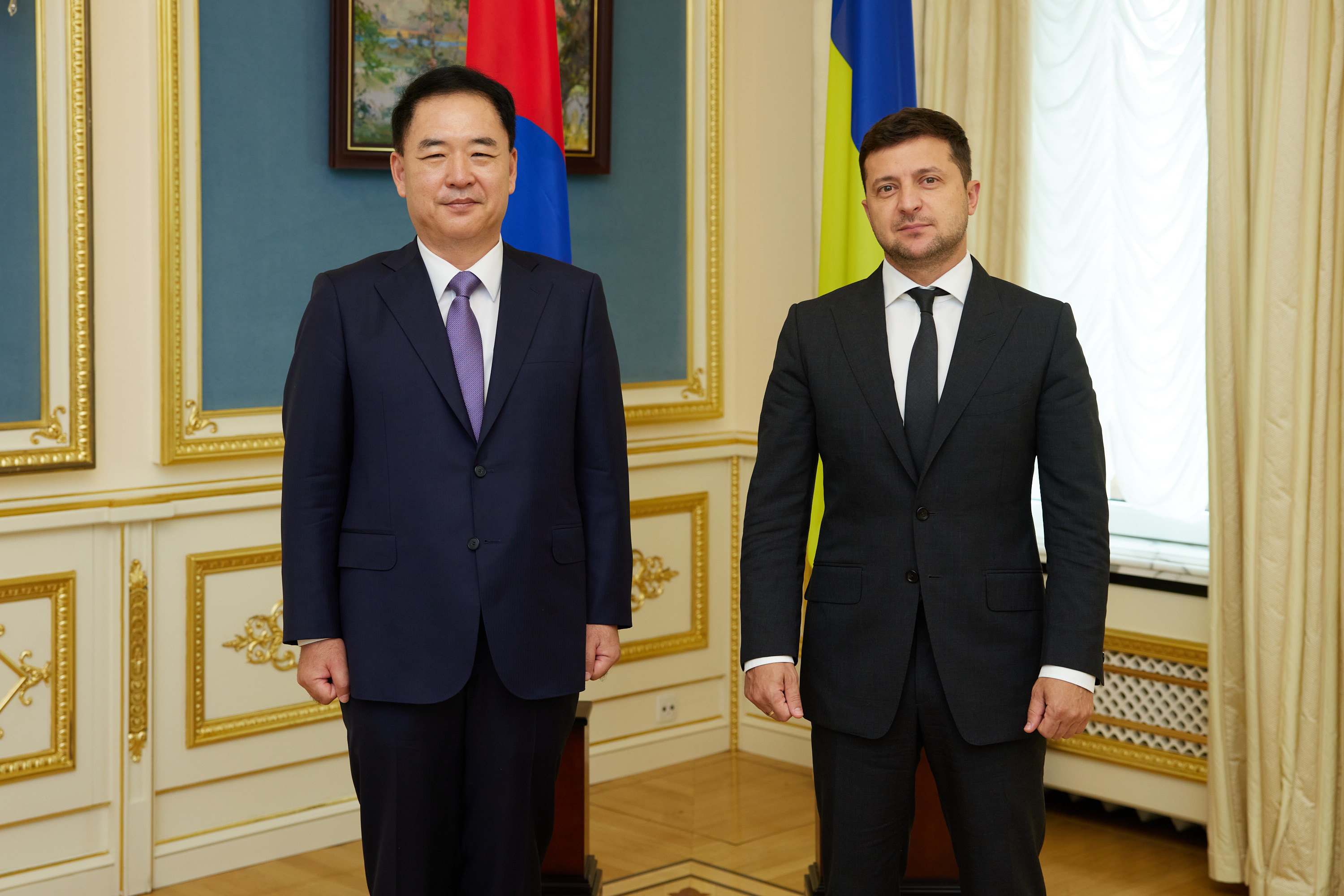
Former South Korean Ambassador, Kim Hyung Tae, and President of Ukraine, Volodymyr Zelenskyy, in Kyiv in 2021.

- Ahn Hyun Won (1993–1995)
- Han Chun Lee (1995–1998)
- Kang Geun Taek (1998–2000)
- Jang Shin (2000–2003)
- Lee Seong Joo (2003–2006)
- Ho Sun Cheol (2006–2008)
- Park Roe Byuk (2008–2011)
- Kim In-jung (2011–2014)
- Sol Kyung Hoon (2014–2016)
- Lee Young Goo (2016–2019)
- Kwon Ki Chang (2019–2021)
- Kim Hyung Tae (2021–2025)
- Park Ki-Chang (2025 – )

== Related Pages ==
- South Korea-Ukraine relations
- Embassy of Ukraine, Seoul
- List of diplomatic missions in Ukraine
- List of diplomatic missions of South Korea
