= List of ambassadors of Ukraine to Russia =

Ambassador of Ukraine to Russia
- Inaugural holder: Volodymyr Kryzhanivsky as Ambassador Extraordinary and Plenipotentiary
- Formation: 1992
- Abolished: 2014
- Website: Ukraine Embassy – Moscow

The Ambassador Extraordinary and Plenipotentiary of Ukraine to the Russian Federation (Ukrainian: Надзвичайний і Повноважний посол України в Російській Федерації) was the ambassador of Ukraine to Russia. In March 2014 Ukraine recalled its ambassador and was represented by its temporary chargé d'affaires. In June 2014 Ukrainian President Petro Poroshenko stated that bilateral relations with Russia cannot be normalized unless Russia undoes its unilateral annexation of Crimea and returns its control of Crimea to Ukraine. Ukraine severed diplomatic relations with Russia and evacuated its entire embassy personnel from Moscow on 24 February 2022, when Russia launched its invasion of Ukraine.

The first Ukrainian ambassador to Russia assumed his post in 1992, the same year a Ukrainian embassy opened in Moscow. During the Soviet times, the embassy of Ukraine to Russia was called the Permanent Delegation of Government of Ukraine to the Council of Ministers of the Soviet Union.

== List of representatives ==
=== Cossack Hetmanate ===
- 1649–1649 – Syluyan Muzhylovsky
- 1653–1653 – Syluyan Muzhylovsky and K. Burlyai

=== Ukrainian People's Republic ===
- 1917–1917 – Petro Stebnytsky (as Commissar in Affairs with Ukraine)
- 1918–1918 – Serhiy Shelukhin
- 1919–1919 – Semen Mazurenko

=== Council of Ministers of the Ukrainian SSR ===
- 1921–1923 – Mykhailo Poloz
- 1923–1924 – Anton Prykhodko
- 1924–1929 – Danylo Petrovsky
- 1932–1932 – Kyrylo Suhomlin
- 1932–1935 – Vasyl Poraiko
- 1935–1937 – Vasyl Polyakov
- 1942–1944 – Pavlo Rosgansky
- 1944–1946 – Petro Rudnycsky
- 1946–1950 – Nikolai Podgorny
- 1950–1953 – Grygoriy Onishenko
- 1953–1976 – Yuriy Dudin
- 1976–1991 – Mykhailo Pichuzhkin
- 1991–1991 – Volodymyr Fedorov

=== Ukraine ===
- 1992–1994 – Volodymyr Kryzhanivsky
- 1995–1999 – Volodymyr Fedorov
- 1999–2005 – Mykola Biloblotsky
- 2005–2006 – Leonid Osavolyuk (provisional)
- 2006–2008 – Oleh Dyomin
- 2008–2010 – Kostyantyn Gryshchenko
- 2010–2010 – Yevhen Herasymov (provisional)
- 2010–2014 – Volodymyr Yelchenko
- 2015–2019 – Ruslan Nimchynskyy, Chargé d'Affaires ad interim
- 2019–2022 – Vasyl Pokotylo, Chargé d'Affaires ad interim

== See also ==
- Ukrainian Embassy, Moscow
- Постійне представництво Ради Міністрів УРСР при Раді Міністрів СРСР
