= Liudmyla Skyrda =

Ukrainian poet (born 1945)

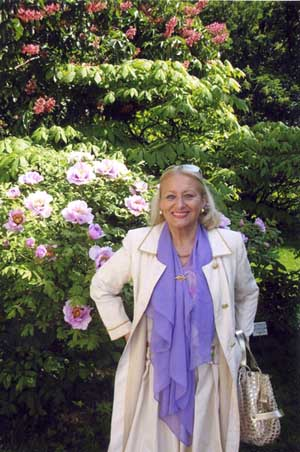
- Born: 15 September 1945 (age 80); Kirovograd, Ukrainian SSR, Soviet Union
- Occupations: Poet, scholar, literary critic
- Spouse: Yurii Kostenko
- Writing career
- Genre: Ukrainian literature
- Website: liuskyrda.com.ua

Liudmyla Mykhailivna Skyrda (Ukrainian: Людми́ла Миха́йлівна Скирда́; born 15 September 1945) is a Ukrainian poet, scholar, literary critic, specialist in literature, culture expert, translator.

== Biography ==
Liudmyla Skyrda is a Ukrainian poet, scholar, literary critic, specialist in literature, culture expert, translator, member of the Ukrainian Writers Guild, laureate of literary awards named after Andriy Malyshko, Hryhoriy Skovoroda, Volodymyr Vynnychenko, Ivan Koshelivets, Honoured Arts Creator of Ukraine.

Liudmyla Skyrda was born on 15 September 1945 in an employee's family of Kirovograd, in the Ukrainian SSR of the Soviet Union (in present-day Ukraine). Since 1950 her family has been living in Kyiv, where in 1968 she graduated from Kyiv University.

Her first poems were published in 1962 the newspaper Literary Ukraine and the magazine Dnipro. They were republished by the Ukrainian diaspora in Canada, the United States and Poland. Her first book Expectation was published in 1965.

In 1968 Skyrda entered a PhD programme at Kyiv University. In 1974, she passed her PhD defense of her thesis on the literary creativity of the repressed poet Yevhen Pluzhnyk. Subsequently, she began to work at Kyiv University as a senior lecturer at the department History of Ukrainian Literature.

From 1984 till 1988 Liudmyla Skyrda ran an author's cultural program “Live Word” on Ukrainian Television.

From 1986 to 1988 Ludmila was studying in the doctorate where she finalized a doctoral thesis on Ukrainian poetry.

In 1988 Liudmyla Skyrda went to Vienna, where her husband – Ukrainian diplomat Yurii Kostenko hold rank of the Permanent Representative of Ukraine to International Organizations, soon he became the first Ambassador Extraordinary and Plenipotentiary of independent Ukraine in the Republic of Austria. She began active cultural and creative activity aimed at establishing friendly contacts with the Ukrainian diaspora, Austrian intellectuals and mass-media, delivered lectures on Ukrainian literature, conducted programs on Austrian channel Österreichischer Rundfunk (ORF), devoted to Taras Shevchenko, Lesya Ukrainka, Ivan Franko, Yevhen Pluzhnyk and others. Two separate programmes were dedicated to the creative work of Liudmyla Skyrda. Before long, two volumes of her poetry appeared in German translation – The Day of Soul (1994), The Meditation near the Stephansdom (1994). The presentations of those books, which took place at the Polish Cultural Center, were attended by well-known Austrian and Polish poets, musicians, social and political leaders in Austria and members of the diplomatic corps.

In 1994, her husband was appointed Ambassador Extraordinary and Plenipotentiary of Ukraine to Germany and she moved to Bonn, where she continued creative work. There she published two more volumes of poetry, The Elegies of the Rhine (1995) and In the Embraces of Jugendstil (1996), the presentations of which were attended by the artistic community and members of the diplomatic corps of Bonn.

From 1997 to 2000, she lived and worked in Kyiv, where her poems “Ad Astra” and "Rose Angel or Compositions at the Wheel" were published, causing great interest among the press and literary society of Ukraine.

In 2001, her husband was appointed Ambassador Extraordinary and Plenipotentiary of Ukraine to Japan, where she moved and where she lived and worked till 2006. During her time there, she published two books in Japanese translation, The Garden of Love and Sun (2004) and The Magic Shell (2004), and one in Ukrainian, Sakura's Dzuihidtsu (2005). She translated into Ukrainian the book To Build Bridges (2004), written by the Japanese Empress Michiko, delivered lectures on Ukrainian literature at Kyoto University and lectures on gender problems of modernity at Sokko Gakai University.

On Japanese television several programs were devoted to work of Liudmyla Skyrda, articles and interviews about her regularly appeared in Japanese newspapers. Presentations of books were held in the major cities of Japan - Tokyo, Osaka, Yokohama, Kyoto.

In 2006 Liudmyla Skyrda returned to Ukraine where she continued to work fruitfully. From 2006 to 2009, her books were published (in the languages of these countries) in the United Arab Emirates (Seventh Heaven), Greece (Hellenic Elegies), Italy (Butterflies and Flowers), Korea (A Shower of Plum Blossoms), and Russia (Birds and Flowers of Four Seasons), where presentations took place and caused a wide resonance in the press of these countries.

In 2009, Liudmyla Skyrda was awarded the Gold Medal (Мedaglia d’oro) of the “Union by Dante Alighieri” (Italy), for significant contribution to the development of cultural ties with Italy and spread of Italian language and literature abroad. On the same year Liudmyla Skyrda represented Ukrainian poetry at the World Arts Festival - Delphic Games on Jeju Island (Korea).

In 2009 Yurii Kostenko was appointed Ambassador Extraordinary and Plenipotentiary of Ukraine to China, and Skyrda has been living and working there to the present (2011).

Liudmyla Skyrda is one of the few Ukrainian literary figures widely known abroad.

Her poetry absorbed the impact of European and Oriental cultures, which led to a completely unique poetic phenomenon not only in the context of Ukrainian literature, but literature and of the entire Slavic world. Lyrics of Liudmyla Skyrda were translated into English, Italian, Portuguese, Russian, Polish, Hungarian, Romanian, Finnish, German, Japanese, Korean, Uzbek, Greek, Chinese and Arabic.

Liudmyla Skyrda is an author of more than two hundred scientific articles and critical essays published in Ukraine and other countries.

Portrait of Liudmyla Skyrda were written by famous artists of Ukraine: Grigory Gavrilenko (1964, 1970, 1978), Victor Zaretsky (1966, 1970, 1986), Ivan Marchuk (1979), John Bedzir (1967), Irina Makarova (1978), Nikolai Kompanets (1985 ), Nikolai Rapay (1970, 1975, 1982); sculptural portraits - by Max Gelman (1968), Nikolai Rapay (1970, 1980).

In 1966 Liudmyla Skyrda played in the movie by famous Ukrainian poet and director Mykola Vinhranovsky The Coast of Hope (Dovzhenko Film Studios).

== Poetry ==
- «Expectation», Kyiv, 1965
- «Stairs», Kyiv, 1975
- «Wings», Kyiv, 1978
- «The Elegies of the Evening Garden», Kyiv, 1982
- «Harmony», Kyiv, 1984
- «Days and Nights», Kyiv, 1985
- «Music for Two», Kyiv, 1988
- «The Day of Soul», Vienna, 1991, (Ger. lang.)
- «The Meditation near the Stephensdom», Vienna, 1994, (Ger. lang.)
- «The Elegies of Rhine», Bonn, 1996, (Ger. lang.)
- «In the Embraces of Ugendstyle», Bonn, 1997
- «Ad Astra!», Kyiv, 2000
- «Rose Angel or Compositions at the Wheel», Kyiv, 2000
- «The Garden of Love and Sun», Tokyo, 2004, (Japan. lang.)
- «Build Bridges», Tokyo, 2004, (translation into Ukrainian of a book written by the Japanese Empress Michiko)
- «The Magic Shell», Tokyo, 2004, (Japan. lang.)
- «Sakura's Dzuihidtsu», Tokyo, 2005
- «Solo of the sunny soul», Kyiv-Tokyo, 2007, (Eng. lang.)
- «Birds and Flowers of Four Seasons », Kyiv-Moscow, 2008, (Rus. lang.)
- «Hellenic Elegies», Athens, 2009, (Greek lang.)
- «Seventh Heaven», Abu-Dhabi, 2009, (Arab. lang.)
- «Butterflies and Flowers», Rome, 2009, (Ital. lang.)
- «Singing of Azaleas», Tashkent, 2009, (Uzbek. lang.)
- «Rain of Plums», Seul, 2009, (Kor. lang.)

== Monograph ==
- "Modern Ukrainian Poetry"
- "Poet and Warrior"
- "Yevhen Pluzhnyk"
- "Modern Ukrainian Poem "

== Literary awards ==
- named after Andriy Malyshko
- named after Hryhoriy Skovoroda
- Gold Medal Мedaglia d’oro of the “Union by Dante Alighieri” (Italy)
