= Embassy of Ukraine, Brussels =

Diplomatic mission of Ukraine in Brussels, Belgium

- Location: 1180 Uccle, Brussels-Capital Region, Belgium
- Address: Avenue Albert Lancaster / Albert Lancasterlaan 30–32
- Coordinates: 50°47′44″N 4°21′38″E
- Ambassador: Natalia Anoshina
- Jurisdiction: Belgium; Luxembourg
- Website: belgium.mfa.gov.ua/en/embassy

The Embassy of Ukraine in Brussels is the chief diplomatic mission of Ukraine in Belgium. The embassy also represents the relations between Ukraine and Luxembourg.

The embassy is located at 30–32, avenue Albert Lancaster/Albert Lancasterlaan in the Uccle municipality of Brussels. Natalia Anoshina has been the Ukrainian Ambassador to Belgium and Luxembourg since 2021.

== Mission ==
The main task of the Embassy of Ukraine in Brussels is to represent the interests of Ukraine, to promote the development of political, economic, cultural, scientific and other relations, as well as to protect the rights and interests of Ukrainian citizens and legal entities that are in the territory of the Kingdom of Belgium and the Grand Duchy of Luxembourg.

The embassy contributes to the development of interstate relations at all levels between Ukraine and Belgium, as well as Ukraine and Luxembourg, to ensure the harmonious development of mutual relations and cooperation on issues of common interest. The embassy also performs consular functions.

== History ==
Following the proclamation of Ukraine's independence on 24 August 1991, Belgium recognized Ukraine on 31 December 1991. On 10 March 1992, diplomatic relations were established between Ukraine and Belgium. Luxembourg recognized Ukraine's independence along with other EU countries on 31 December 1991. Diplomatic relations between the two countries were established on 1 July 1992.

== Heads of the Mission ==
Представники України при ЄС
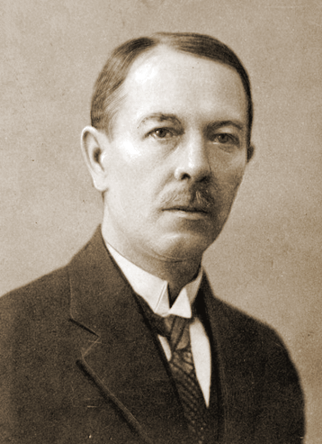
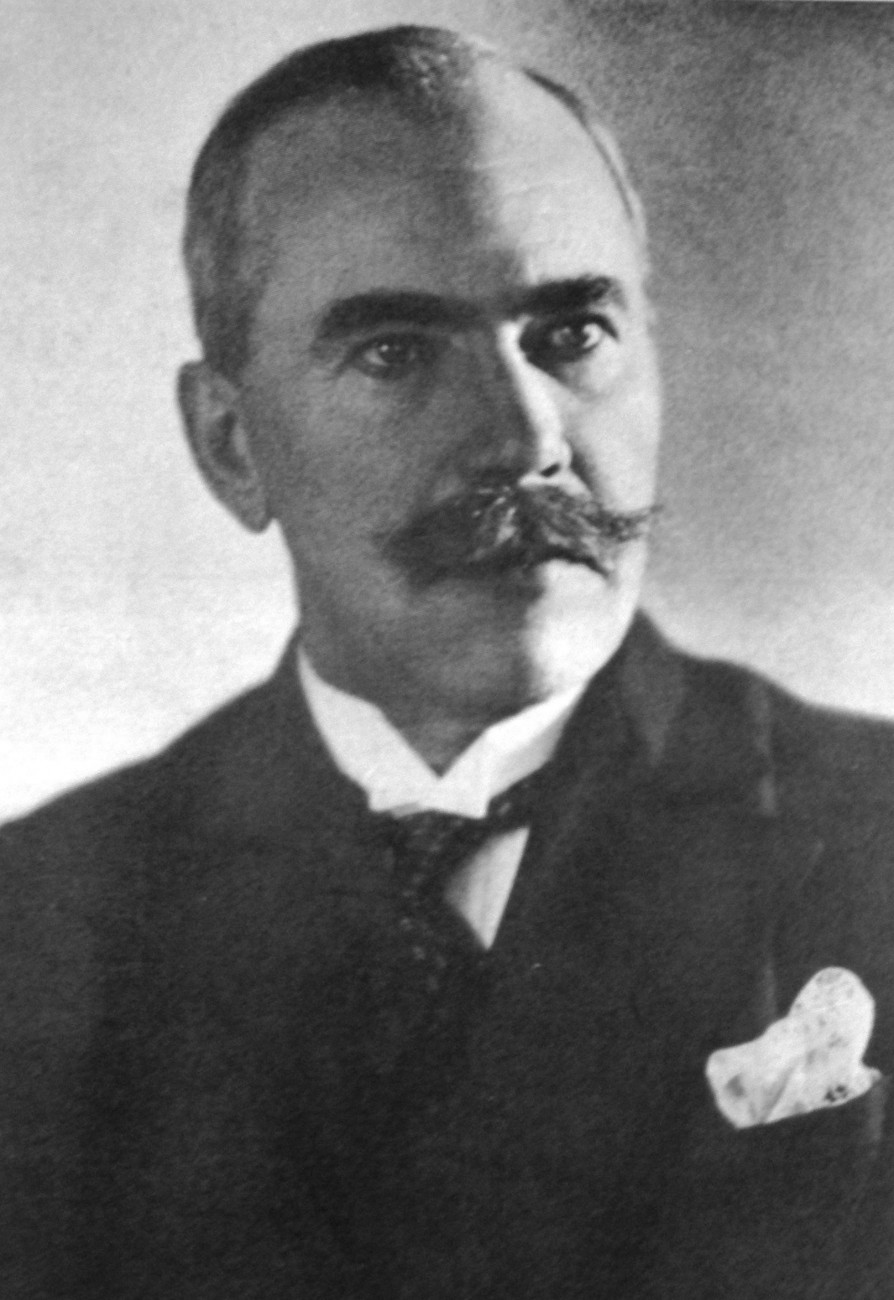
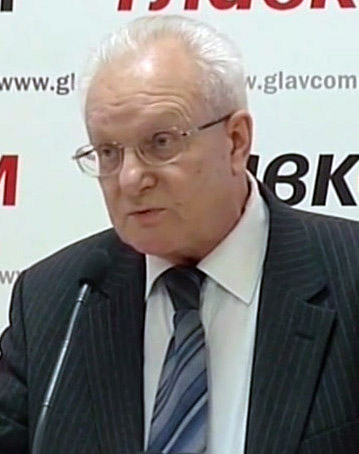
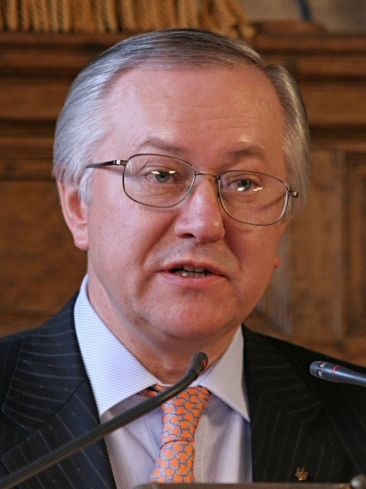
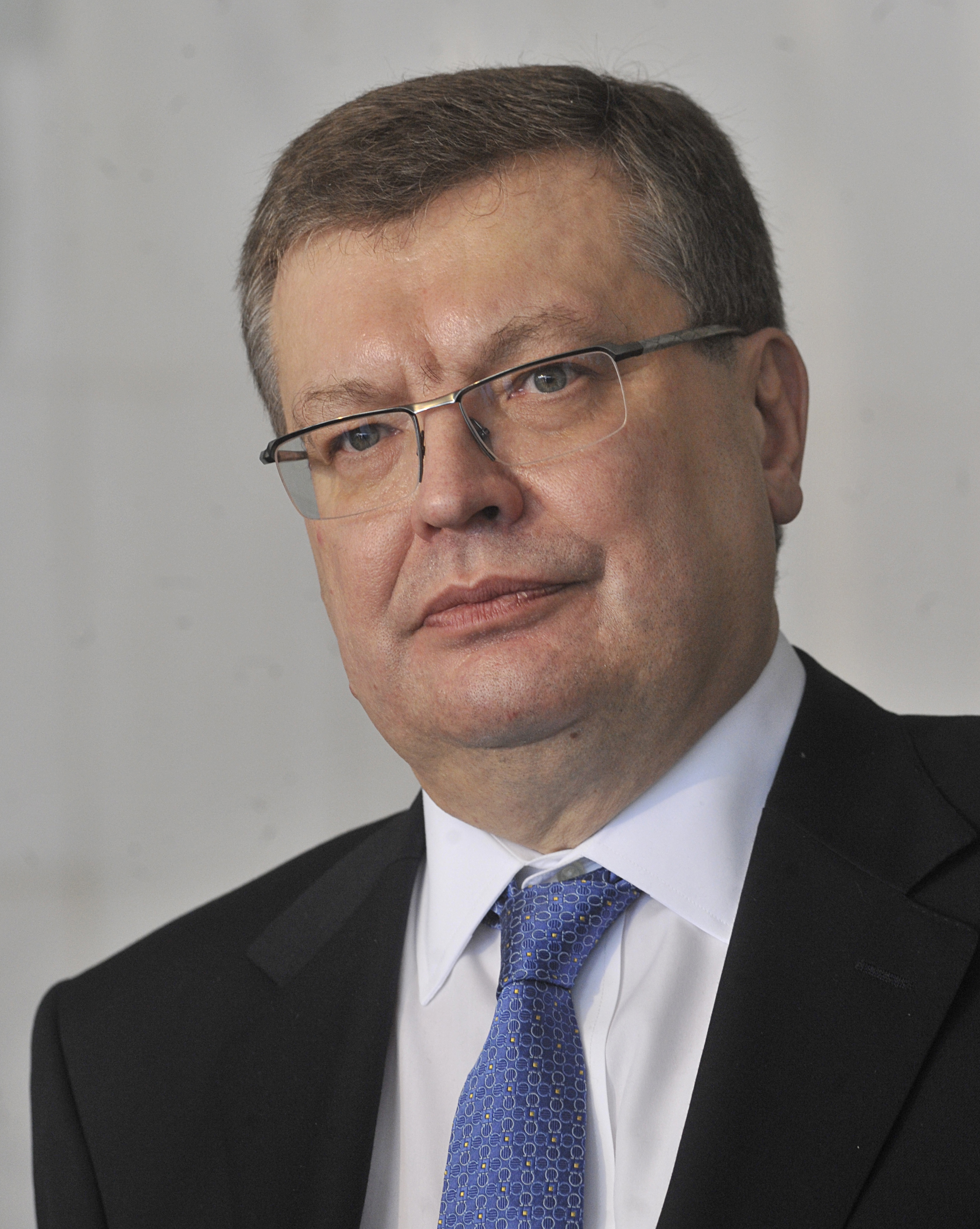
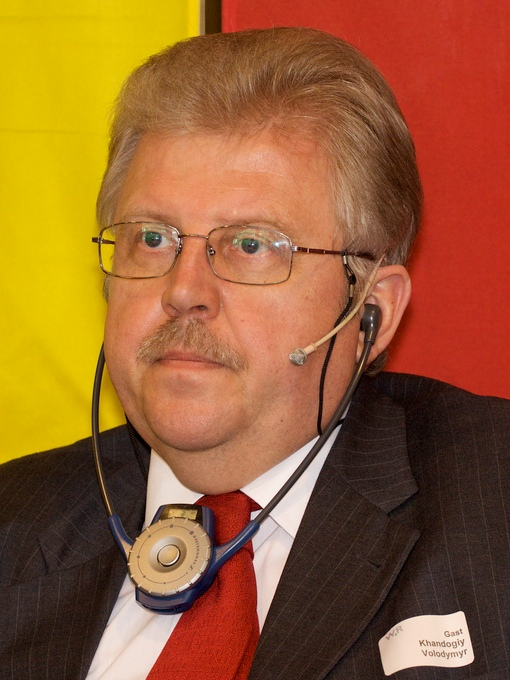
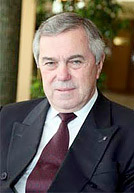
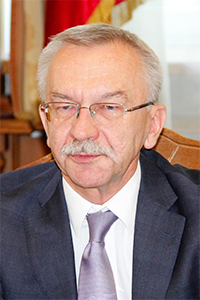
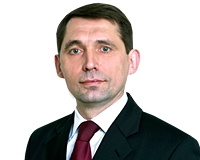
N	Term	Ambassador	Image
1	1918	Dmytro Levytsky
2	(1919–1921)	Yakovliv Andriy Ivanovych
3	1992–1995	Volodymyr Vasylenko
4	1995–1998	Borys Tarasyuk
5	1998–2000	Kostyantyn Hryshchenko
6	2000–2005	Volodymyr Khandohiy
7	2005–2008	Koval Jaroslav Hryhorovych
8	2008–2010	Bersheda Yevgen Romanovych
9	2010–2015	Ihor Dolhov
10	2016–2021	Mykola Tochytskyi
11	2021	Natalia Anoshina

== See also ==
- Belgium–Ukraine relations
- Foreign relations of Ukraine
