= Zhanna Leshchynska =

Ukrainian diplomat (born 1973)

- Жанна Лещинська
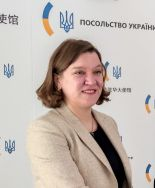

Provisional Ambassador of Ukraine to China
- In office 2021–2023
- Preceded by: Serhii Kamyshev
- Succeeded by: Pavlo Riabikin

Personal details
- Born: December 16, 1973 (age 51); Kyiv, Ukraine

Zhanna Valeriyvna Leshchynska (Ukrainian: Жанна Валеріївна Лещинська; b. 16 December 1973) is a Ukrainian diplomat. She served as the provisional ambassador of Ukraine to China between 2021 and 2023.

== Biography ==
Leshchynska graduated from the Kyiv National Linguistic University in 1996, having majored in German. Her diplomatic career encompasses various positions within the Ministry of Foreign Affairs of Ukraine. She served as Consul of Ukraine in China. Subsequently, she was appointed deputy director of the Department and Head of the Division for Asia-Pacific Countries. Olena also held the position of acting director of the Department of Asia-Pacific Countries.

After serving as First Secretary at the Ukrainian Embassy in China, she assumed the role of Counselor-Envoy and Chargé d'Affaires, becoming the acting head of the embassy.
