= Volodymyr Kryzhanivsky =

Ukrainian politician and diplomat

- Володимир Крижанівський
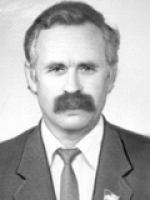
- Kryzhanivsky in 1990

Ambassador of Ukraine to Russia
- In office 11 March 1992 – 12 September 1994
- Preceded by: Position established
- Succeeded by: Volodymyr Fedorov

People's Deputy of Ukraine
- In office 15 May 1990 – 11 March 1992
- Preceded by: Position established
- Succeeded by: Constituency abolished
- Constituency: Kyiv, Livoberezhnyi Masyv

Personal details
- Born: Voldoymyr Petrovych Kryzhanivsky; 24 January 1940 (age 86) Vinnytsia, Ukrainian SSR, Soviet Union (now Ukraine)
- Party: Nova Ukraina
- Other political affiliations: Democratic Bloc
- Education: Kyiv Engineering and Construction Institute

Voldoymyr Petrovych Kryzhanivsky (Ukrainian: Володимир Петрович Крижанівський; born 24 January 1940) is a Ukrainian politician and diplomat who served as the first Ambassador of Ukraine to Russia from 1992 to 1994. Kryzhanivsky also served as a People's Deputy of Ukraine from 1990 to 1992, representing Livoberezhnyi Masyv in Kyiv.

== Early life and career ==
Kryzhanivsky was born in a family of civil servants on 24 January 1940 in Vinnytsia.

In 1958, he was a student and had graduated from the Kyiv Engineering and Construction Institute (now the Kyiv National University of Construction and Architecture) with a specialisation in construction engineering.

In 1963, he worked at Vykonrob BMU-18 as an engineer, and senior engineer. In 1965, he became the head of the team, engineer, chief specialist, and head of the department of the Institute of the Central Research Institute "Proektstalkonstruktsiya".

In 1984, he became the head of one of the departments of the Institute "Ukr. NII Projectstalkonstruktsiya".

== Political career ==
Kryzhanivsky was nominated as a candidate for People's Deputy by the labour collective "UkrNDI proektstalkonstruktionsia". On 19 March 1990, he was elected as a People's Deputy of Ukraine with 48.80% of the vote in the second round of elections. Kryzhanivsky, the candidate of the opposition Democratic Bloc, faced ten opponents during the election. He later joined the Nova Ukraina faction, and was the chairman of the subcommittee of the commission of the Verkhovna Rada of Ukraine on human rights.

In 1991, he became the Plenipotentiary representative of Ukraine to Russia. On 11 March 1992, Kryzhanivsky became the first Ambassador of Ukraine to Russia.

On 12 September 1994, he was dismissed as ambassador by President Leonid Kuchma That same year, he became the executive director of MP "Plastic", based in Kyiv.

From 2007 to 2009, he was the chairman of the association "Vinnytsia in Kyiv".

== Political views ==
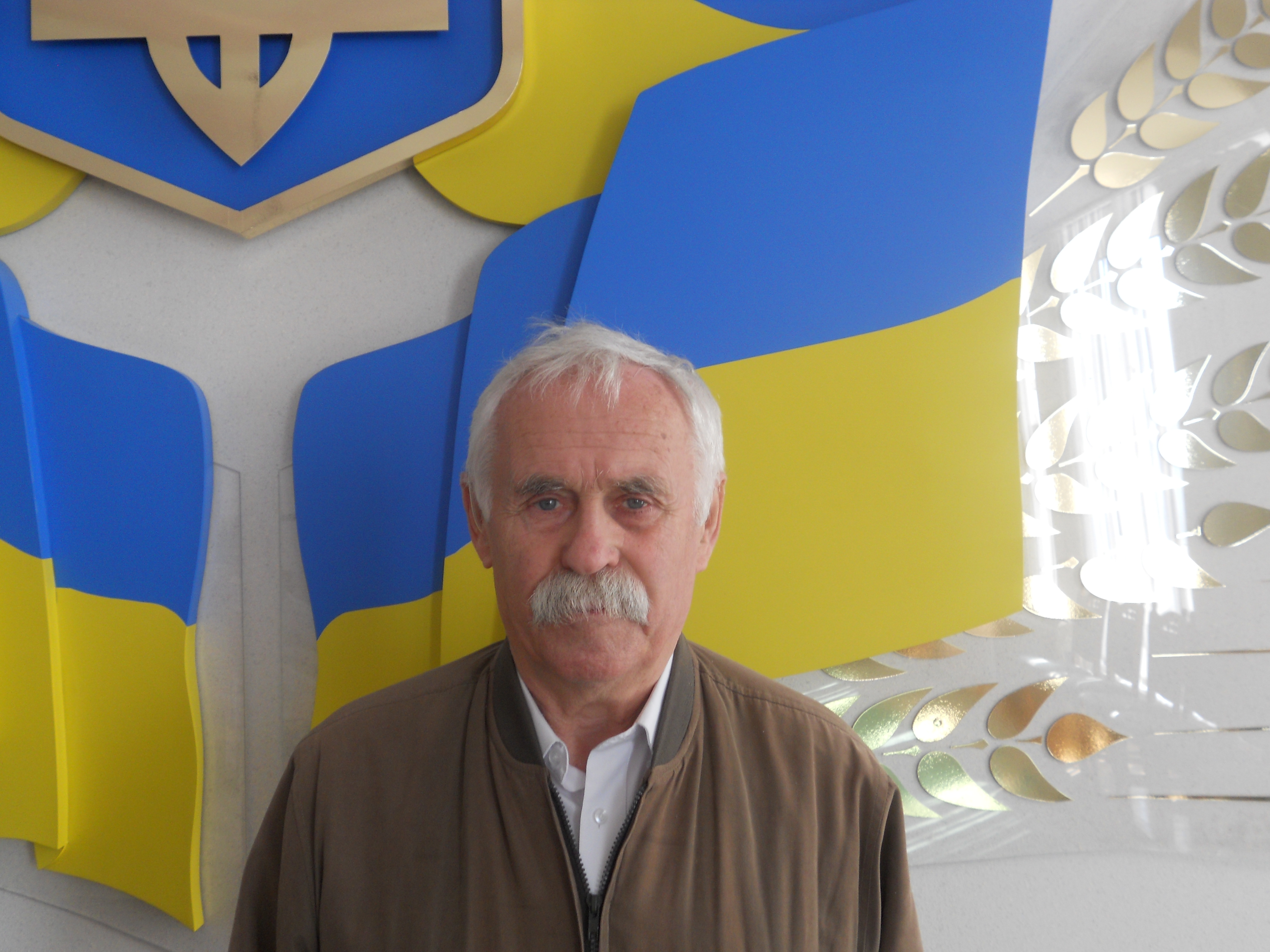
Kryzhanivsky in 2015

In January 2015, in an interview with journalists, he criticized the annexation of Crimea to Russia and stated that all ethnic Russians should be expelled from the region.
