= Kostyantyn Gryshchenko =

Ukrainian diplomat and politician

- Костянтин Грищенко
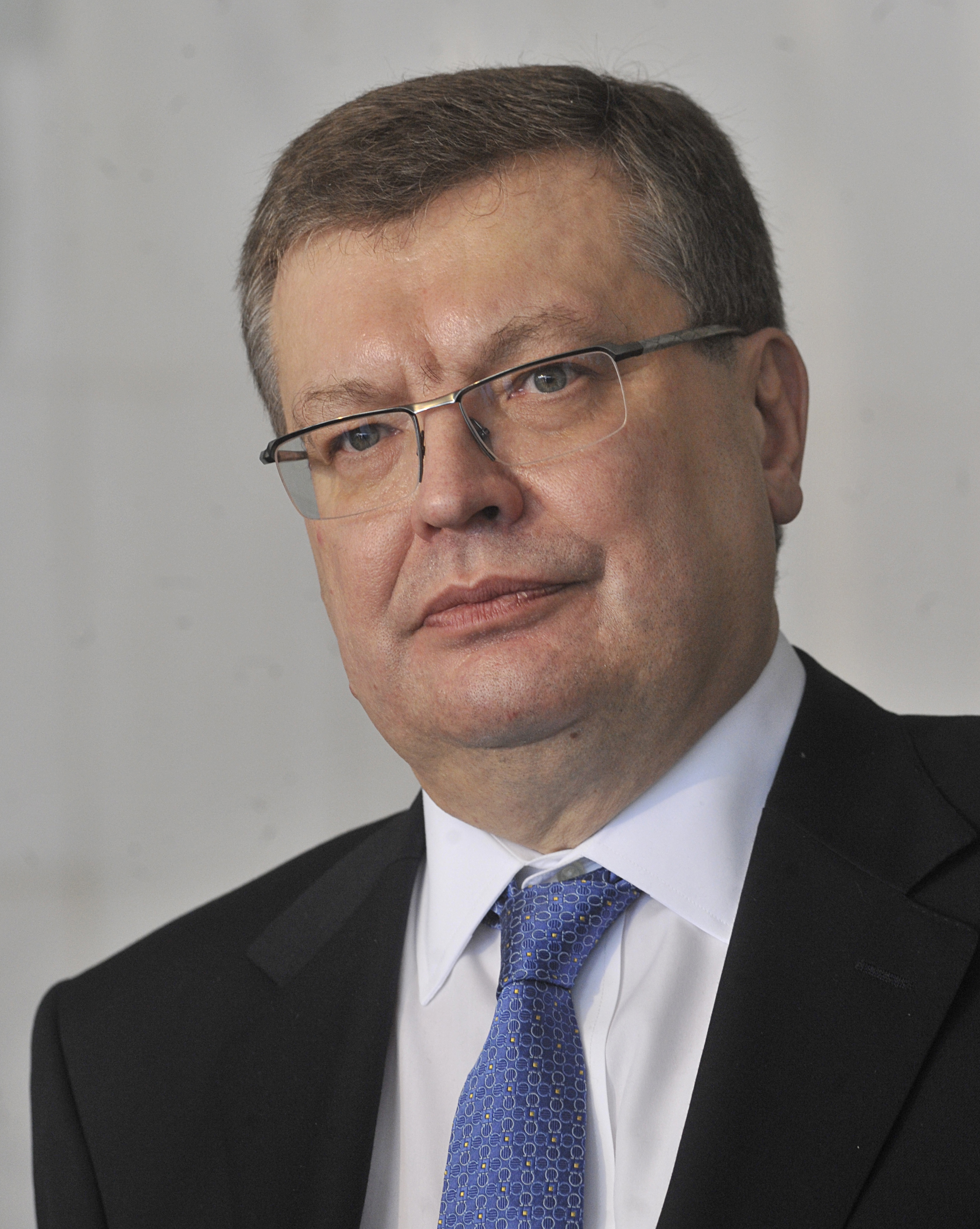
- Gryshchenko in 2012

Vice Prime Minister of Ukraine
- In office 24 December 2012 – 27 February 2014
- Prime Minister: Mykola Azarov
- Preceded by: Volodymyr Semynozhenko
- Succeeded by: Oleksandr Sych

11th Minister for Foreign Affairs
- In office 11 March 2010 – 24 December 2012
- Prime Minister: Mykola Azarov
- Preceded by: Petro Poroshenko
- Succeeded by: Leonid Kozhara
- In office 2 September 2003 – 3 February 2005
- Prime Minister: Viktor Yanukovych
- Preceded by: Anatoliy Zlenko
- Succeeded by: Borys Tarasiuk

Ambassador of Ukraine to Russia
- In office 2008–2010
- President: Viktor Yushchenko
- Preceded by: Oleh Dyomin
- Succeeded by: Volodymyr Yelchenko

6th Ambassador of Ukraine to the United States
- In office January 2000 – September 2003
- President: Leonid Kuchma
- Preceded by: Anton Buteyko
- Succeeded by: Mykhailo Reznik

Ambassador of Ukraine to Belgium
- In office 1998–2000
- President: Leonid Kuchma
- Succeeded by: Volodymyr Khandohiy

Personal details
- Born: 28 October 1953 (age 73) Kyiv, Ukrainian SSR, Soviet Union
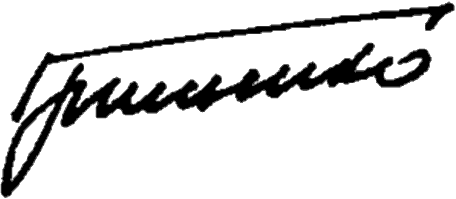
- Signature

Kostyantyn Ivanovych Gryshchenko (also spelled Hryshchenko; Ukrainian: Костянтин Іванович Грищенко; born 28 October 1953) is a Ukrainian diplomat and politician. Since Ukraine gained independence, Gryshchenko has served in a succession of senior positions with responsibilities ranging from arms control and regional security to education and public health. He served as Vice Prime Minister of Ukraine (2012–2014), Minister of Foreign Affairs of Ukraine (2003–2005 and 2010–2012) and First Deputy Secretary of the National Security and Defense Council of Ukraine (2008–2010). He holds the diplomatic rank of Ambassador Extraordinary and Plenipotentiary.

== Early life, education and professional activity ==
In 1975, Gryshchenko graduated with honors from Moscow State Institute of International Relations with a specialty in international law. Between 1976 and 1980 Gryshchenko served as a staff member of the United Nations Secretariat in New York City. (Note: Yuri Drozdov was KGB resident at the United Nations as the Soviet Union's deputy representative to United Nations from 1975–1979. In 1978, Arkady Shevchenko, a Soviet diplomat at the United Nations, defected to the United States and was debriefed by Aldrich Ames.) From 1981 to 1991 he held various diplomatic positions in the Ministry of Foreign Affairs of the USSR.

== Ukrainian diplomatic service ==
Following the collapse of the Soviet Union, Gryshchenko returned to Kyiv where he assumed several positions in the Ministry of Foreign Affairs of newly independent Ukraine.

Between 1995 and 1998 Gryshchenko served as the Deputy Minister of Foreign Affairs of Ukraine with responsibilities covering arms control and disarmament, European security, the Commonwealth of Independent States, Russian Federation, Middle East, Asia, Africa and the Pacific region. He played a key role in negotiating a number of crucial international agreements aimed at strengthening the independence, territorial integrity and security of Ukraine. During this time Gryshchenko initiated a large scale program for professional diplomatic training for newly recruited MFA personnel in a number of the EU countries and in the United States. Many of the graduates later became leading diplomats in the Ukrainian diplomatic service.

1998–2000 – Head of Ukrainian Mission to NATO, Ambassador of Ukraine to Belgium, the Netherlands and Luxembourg, Permanent Representative to the Organization for the Prohibition of Chemical Weapons (OPCW) in The Hague.

2000–2003 – Ambassador of Ukraine to the United States and in 2001 non-resident Ambassador to Antigua and Barbuda.

== Foreign Minister (2003–2005) ==
From 2003–2005, he was Minister of Foreign Affairs of Ukraine.

His policy priorities as Foreign Minister were European integration, strengthening ties with Washington and enhancing pragmatic cooperation with Russia. In 2003 he publicly opposed joining the Common Economic Space with Russia, Kazakhstan and Belarus. He, along with other members of the Cabinet, argued that membership in this institution would contradict the Ukrainian Constitution. During the Ukrainian-Russian Tuzla crisis in 2003 he engaged all diplomatic tools at his disposal to counter Moscow's attempts to challenge Ukraine's territorial integrity and return to normal relations with Russian Federation.

From 2006–2007, he was Foreign Policy Adviser to Prime Minister of Ukraine.

After snap parliamentary elections in 2007, Gryshchenko joined the Opposition Government as a shadow Minister of Foreign Affairs.

== Ambassador to Moscow (2008-2010) ==
With deepening political crisis in the Ukrainian-Russian relations President Victor Yushchenko in April 2008 appointed Gryshchenko First Deputy Secretary of Ukraine's National Security and Defense Council (NSDC) and in July – Ambassador to the Russian Federation. Gryshchenko continued serving as First Deputy Secretary of the NSDC giving Ukraine's Ambassador to Russia a special status that signaled the concern of the senior leadership over Ukrainian-Russian relations.

The main credo of Gryshchenko's ambassadorship was expressed in his program article "Ukraine–Russia: the person and the state" in the Ukrainian weekly magazine "Zerkalo Nedeli":"…the source of many conflicts and contradictions in the Ukrainian-Russian relationshipis rooted in one basic fact: in the years after collapse of the USSR, while sharing many common interests, we drifted apart on how we perceive our future social development and our values. Acceptance of these objective differences has to hold both Moscow and Kyiv and prevent us from attempts to teach each other, and to impose on our neighbor our own model as only true one".

During a TV duel with Dmitry Rogozin (then Russian Ambassador to NATO) Gryshchenko stated that in Russia unacceptable ideology for developing normal Ukrainian-Russian relations is being imposed on society. He insisted that contentious issues need to be discussed in order to be resolved and thereafter agreements have to be consistently implemented, rather than aggravating them thus creating basis for future conflicts. As to the prospect of Ukraine's accession to NATO he replied that there is no realistic chance of it happening in foreseeable future, but, in any case, the direction of foreign policy of Ukraine will be decided only by the Ukrainian people and not by Moscow, Washington or Brussels.

After the presidential election in 2010 Gryshchenko was appointed Minister of Foreign Affairs for the second time.

== Second term as foreign minister (2010-2012) ==
In spring 2010, the newly appointed foreign minister embarked on a challenging mission to calm increasingly tense relations between Kyiv and Moscow. He pursued pragmatic policy course focusing on areas where cooperation would yield better results for both parties than conflict. With this approach Ukrainian exports to Russia almost doubled, a long-delayed demarcation of the land border between the two countries was implemented. By mitigating tensions between the two neighbors the Foreign Ministry eased administrative and police pressure on millions of Ukrainians in Russia. The détente in relations with Russia made it possible to persuade cautious Europeans to move forward with an ambitious Association Agreement with Ukraine.

The lifting of travel barriers for Ukrainian citizens was another priority. Under Gryshchenko's guidance Ukrainian diplomats managed to negotiate visa free travel regimes with Israel, Turkey, Brazil, Argentina.

Gryshchenko articulated Ukraine's foreign policy at the time as follows: "Ukraine’s European policy has to be the priority, but has to be pragmatic. We need to understand that Ukraine undoubtedly has a European vocation, but in the current international reality Ukraine –in order to reach this goal –will have to steer its way forward quite differently from the new EU member states. It will be a path of internal transformation consistent with the European norms, in strategic partnership with the European Union and Russia, but also through development of cooperation with the regions of the world where we see dynamic economic development, a proactive desire to cooperate with Ukraine and respect for our national aspirations".

Among his main achievements during this period were the completion of negotiations of the Association Agreement with the EU in 2012 and finalization of the plan for a visa-free regime with the EU. Economic diplomacy was given a special priority. Formerly separate and inefficient trade missions were fully integrated into embassies and newly established Council of exporters established under the MFA auspices started to play an important role of promoter for Ukrainian goods and companies in international markets.

== Vice Prime Minister (2012-2014) ==
In December 2012 Gryshchenko was named Vice Prime Minister of Ukraine by Viktor Yanukovych and became the first Foreign Minister in Ukraine's history tapped to leverage his international experience to address domestic social issues. His portfolio included science and education, health care, culture, youth and sports.

Among his priorities were strengthening of drug quality oversight (EU medicine standards were implemented in 2013 for circulation of medicines good manufacturing practice (GMP) and appropriate practice of distribution (GDP) of drugs). Ukraine became the first country to ratify the Convention of the Council of Europe on counteraction of falsification of medicines and similar crimes which bear threat to public health – the Medicrime Convention and the first post-Soviet state to introduce criminal liability for falsification of drugs. Serious steps were taken to simplify access to anesthetizing medicines for terminal patients. Priority attention was paid to improve availability of medical care (development of a network of institutions of primary link and reforming system of emergency medicine), as well as adoption of the draft of Nationwide target social program of counteraction to HIV/AIDS for 2014–2018.

As Vice Prime Minister, though not directly responsible for foreign policy, Gryshchenko was on a number of occasions called upon to help Ukrainian citizens in distress. In July 2013, on a challenging mission to Tripoli, Libya he secured release of 19 Ukrainians held hostage by anti-government armed militia in the port of Benghazi.

He was dismissed from his position as member of the Cabinet of Ministers of Ukraine on 27 February 2014 by decree of the Verkhovna Rada of Ukraine.

== Post-government ==
In July 2022, Ukrainian law enforcement stated that former Foreign Minister Gryshchenko and former Justice Minister Oleksandr Lavrynovych were under suspicion of high treason for their role in the signing of the Kharkiv Pact with Russia. The suspicions were filed in absentia, as the two were "hiding abroad".

== Personal life ==
Besides his native Ukrainian and Russian languages he is fluent in English and French.

== Awards and honors ==
Gryshchenko was awarded the Order of Merit (third, second and first class) for personal valuable contributions to diplomacy and foreign affairs in Ukraine, and also received Honorary Diplomas of the Cabinet of Ministers of Ukraine (2001, 2003), and the Verkhovna Rada of Ukraine. He was awarded National Order of the Legion of Honour and also received a number of decorations from other foreign states.
