= Pavlo Riabikin =

Ukrainian statesman, diplomat and politician

- Павло Рябікін
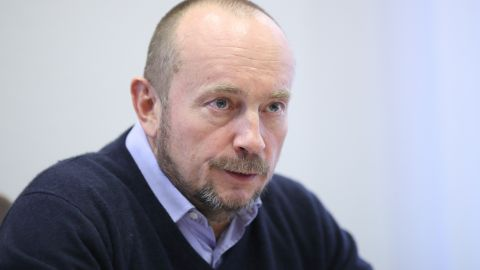
- Riabikin in 2021

Ambassador of Ukraine to China
- In office 14 June 2023 – 21 December 2024
- President: Volodymyr Zelenskyy
- Preceded by: Serhii Kamyshev; Zhanna Leshchynska (provincial)
- Succeeded by: Olexander Nechytaylo

Minister of Strategic Industries
- In office 4 November 2021 – 20 March 2023
- President: Volodymyr Zelenskyy
- Prime Minister: Denys Shmyhal
- Preceded by: Oleh Urusky
- Succeeded by: Oleksandr Kamyshin

Head of the State Customs Service of Ukraine
- In office 18 November 2020 – 3 November 2021
- President: Volodymyr Zelenskyy
- Prime Minister: Denys Shmyhal

CEO of the Boryspil International Airport
- In office 23 March 2017 – 18 November 2020

Personal details
- Born: 6 June 1965 (age 60) Kyiv, Ukrainian SSR, Soviet Union
- Education: Taras Shevchenko National University of Kyiv
- Occupation: Politician; diplomat

Pavlo Riabikin (Ukrainian: Павло Борисович Рябікін, IPA: [pɐu̯ˈlɔ boˈrɪsowɪtʃ rʲɐˈbikin]; born 6 June 1965) is a Ukrainian statesman, politician and diplomat. On 26 April 2023, Ukrainian President Volodymyr Zelenskyy appointed him Ambassador of Ukraine to China.

Riabikin was from November 2021 to March 2023 the Minister of Strategic Industries of Ukraine. Riabikin was Head of the State Customs Service of Ukraine from November 2020 to November 2021. Riabikin was elected to the Verkhovna Rada (Ukraine's national parliament) three times, in 2012 and 2002 and 2000.

== Biography ==
He graduated from Taras Shevchenko National University of Kyiv with a degree in "Jurisprudence", obtained the qualification of "International Lawyer", a translator-referent of the German language. Internship: Leipzig University (1987), Kiel University (2000).

In 2000–2005, he was a People's Deputy of Ukraine, worked in the Committee of the Verkhovna Rada of Ukraine on Legal Policy, and since 2002 – Chairman of the Subcommittee on Economic Issues of the Legislation Committee of the Verkhovna Rada of Ukraine on Economic Policy, Management of the National Economy, Property and Investments. In 2000 he was elected for the party People's Party in majority electoral district 130 situated in Mykolaiv Oblast. In the 2002 Ukrainian parliamentary election he was reelected in the same district as an independent politician.

In March 2005, Riabikin became a member of the leadership of Our Ukraine.

From July 2005 to August 2006, he was a Deputy Minister of Transport and Communications of Ukraine.

From September 2006 to July 2009, from June 2010 to November 2012 and from October 2015 to March 2017, he was the deputy director, chief of the port of the Recreation and Health Center “Green Port”.

From August 2009 to June 2010, he was Ambassador Extraordinary and Plenipotentiary of Ukraine to the Kingdom of Denmark, Ministry of Foreign Affairs of Ukraine. Diplomatic rank — Envoy Extraordinary and Plenipotentiary of the 2nd class (since February 2010).

In the 2012 Ukrainian parliamentary election, Riabikin was elected to the Verkhovna Rada (Ukraine's national parliament) for the party UDAR. From December 2012 to November 2014, he worked in the Committee on Transport and Communications of the Verkhovna Rada of Ukraine. In 2012 Riabikin became Member of the Parliamentary Assembly of the Council of Europe.

From July 2014 to September 2015, he was a deputy head of the Kyiv City State Administration.

From March 2017 to November 2020, he managed the work of the state enterprise Boryspil International Airport in the position of CEO.

From November 2020 to November 2021, he was the Head of the State Customs Service of Ukraine.

In the 2020 Ukrainian local elections Riabikin failed to get elected into the Kyiv City Council for UDAR. He topped the election list of UDAR in Desnianskyi District.

On 4 November 2021, Pavlo Riabikin was appointed as the Minister of Strategic Industries of Ukraine. Parliament dismissed him from this position on 20 March 2023.

On 26 April 2023, Riabikin was appointed Ambassador of Ukraine to China by Ukrainian President Volodymyr Zelenskyy.

== See also ==
- Shmyhal Government
