= Anatolii Pliushko =

Ukrainian diplomat

Anatoliy Pliushko Анатолій Плюшко

Ukrainian ambassador to China
- In office 1993–1998

Personal details
- Born: August 23, 1938 Velyka Oleksandrivka Raion, Kherson Oblast, Ukrainian SSR
- Education: Moscow State University
- Occupation: diplomat

Anatolii Dmytrovych Pliushko (Russian: Анатолій Дмитрович Плюшко; born August 23, 1938) is a Ukrainian diplomat, and was the first ambassador to the People's Republic of China following Ukrainian independence. His service began in December 1993, when the Ukrainian embassy in Beijing first opened. He has since served at his post until the end of his term in 1998.

== History ==
Pliushko was born in Velyka Oleksandrivka Raion in Kherson oblast on August 23, 1938. He then graduated from Moscow State University in 1961 with a degree in Eastern language studies.

- 1961-1966：Chinese teacher
- 1973-1966：Deputy secretary at the Ministry of Foreign Affairs
- 1973-1979：United Nations Secretariat Deputy Protocol Officer
- 1979-1984：MFA Human Resources management, also a representative of the Soviet Union at the UNGA
- 1991-1992：Deputy general of bilateral relations at the Ukrainian MFA
- 1993年1月－1998年8月22日：Ukrainian ambassador to the People's Republic of China

Diplomatic posts
Preceded by Post established	Ukrainian ambassador to China; 1993-1998	Succeeded by Pavlo Sultanskiy
