= Oleh Dyomin =

Ukrainian politician and diplomat

- Олег Дьомін
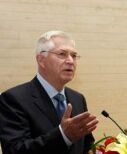

Ambassador of Ukraine to China
- In office 18 July 2013 – 17 May 2019
- Preceded by: Vasyl Hamyanin
- Succeeded by: Serhii Kamyshev
- President: Viktor Yanukovych; Petro Poroshenko

Ambassador of Ukraine to Kazakhstan
- In office 2010–2013
- President: Viktor Yanukovych
- Preceded by: Mykola Selivon
- Succeeded by: Yuri Lazebnyk

Ambassador of Ukraine to Russia
- In office 21 March 2006 – 4 April 2008
- President: Viktor Yushchenko
- Preceded by: Leonid Osavolyuk
- Succeeded by: Kostyantyn Gryshchenko

Personal details
- Born: 4 August 1947 (age 79) Lopatino, Venyovsky District, Tula Oblast, RSFSR, Soviet Union
- Education: Kharkiv National University of Radioelectronics

Oleh Oleksiyovych Dyomin (Ukrainian: Олег Олексійович Дьомін, Russian: Олег Алексеевич Дёмин) is a Soviet and Ukrainian politician and diplomat, a former Ambassador Extraordinary and Plenipotentiary of Ukraine to the Russian Federation, Ambassador of Ukraine to the People's Republic of China.

== Education ==
He graduated from Kharkiv National University of Radioelectronics in 1971 with a major in Radio Engineering, Qualified Expert in Radiophysics. PhD in Economics.

== Career ==
In 1969-1991 – he worked for government.

In 1991-1994 – he was Vice-President of the corporation "Ukrsibinkor", President of the "Perspectiva XXI", Kharkiv, Ukraine.

In 1994-1996 – Deputy Chairman of the Verkhovna Rada of Ukraine (Parliament).

From 1996 to 2000 – Head of Kharkiv Regional State Administration.

In 2000-2005 – First Deputy Head of the Administration of the President of Ukraine.

In 2005-2006 – Deputy Chairman of the People's Democratic Party of Ukraine.

Domin was appointed to the post as ambassador of Ukraine to Russia by Ukrainian president Viktor Yushchenko in March 2006, and held the post in Moscow until his retirement on 4 April 2008. Konstyantyn Hryshchenko was named as his replacement in June 2008.

In 2008-2010 – Director of the Institute of International Relations of Kyiv National Aviation University, Ukraine.

In 2010-2013 – Ambassador Extraordinary and Plenipotentiary of Ukraine to the Republic of Kazakhstan.

From 2013 – Ambassador Extraordinary and Plenipotentiary of Ukraine to the People's Republic of China.

== Awards ==
- Ukrainian Order "For Merits", 1st grade.

Political offices
Preceded by Oleksandr Maselsky	Governor of Kharkiv Oblast; 1996-2000	Succeeded by Yevhen Kushnaryov
