= Yurii Kostenko =

Ukrainian diplomat

Yurii Vasylyovych Kostenko Юрій Васильович Костенко

Ambassador Extraordinary and Plenipotentiary of Ukraine to the People's Republic of China
- In office August 2009 – 12 September 2012

Personal details
- Born: November 6, 1945 Kyiv, Ukraine
- Spouse: Liudmyla Skyrda
- Education: Taras Shevchenko National University of Kyiv

Yurii Vasylyovych Kostenko (Ukrainian: Юрій Васильович Костенко) (b. 6 November 1945) is a Ukrainian diplomat. Ambassador Extraordinary and Plenipotentiary of Ukraine to the People's Republic of China.

== Biography ==
Born in the city of Kyiv November 6, 1945. Taras Shevchenko National University of Kyiv (1968), department of history;

1968 – 1971 – Attaché, Third Secretary, Department of International Organizations, Ministry of Foreign Affairs of the Ukrainian Soviet Socialist Republic;

1971 – 1972 – Service in the Armed Forces;

1972 – 1975 – Third Secretary in the reserve, Third, Second Secretary of the General Secretariat of the Ministry of Foreign Affairs;

1975 – 1984 – Assistant to the Minister, First Secretary, Counselor, Department of International Organizations of the Ministry of Foreign Affairs;

1984 – 1985 – Executive Secretary of the Ukrainian SSR Commission on UNESCO affairs;

1985 – 1988 – Head of the Personnel Department of the Ministry of Foreign Affairs;

1988 – 1994 – Permanent Representative of Ukraine to International Organizations in Vienna;

1992 – 1994 – Ambassador Extraordinary and Plenipotentiary of Ukraine to the Austrian Republic; Head of the Ukrainian delegation to the Vienna negotiations of security and cooperation in Europe;

1994 – 1997 – Ambassador Extraordinary and Plenipotentiary of Ukraine to the Germany;

1997 – 2001 – Ambassador-at-Large, Inspector-General of the Ministry of Foreign Affairs of Ukraine

2001 – 2006 – Ambassador Extraordinary and Plenipotentiary of Ukraine to Japan

2004 – 2006 – Ambassador Extraordinary and Plenipotentiary of Ukraine to the Philippines

2006 – 2008 – Deputy minister for Foreign Affairs of Ukraine

2008 – 2009 – Acting First Deputy minister for Foreign Affairs of Ukraine

August 2009 – 12.09.2012 — Ambassador Extraordinary and Plenipotentiary of Ukraine to the People's Republic of China.
