= South Korea–Ukraine relations =

- South Korea: Ukraine

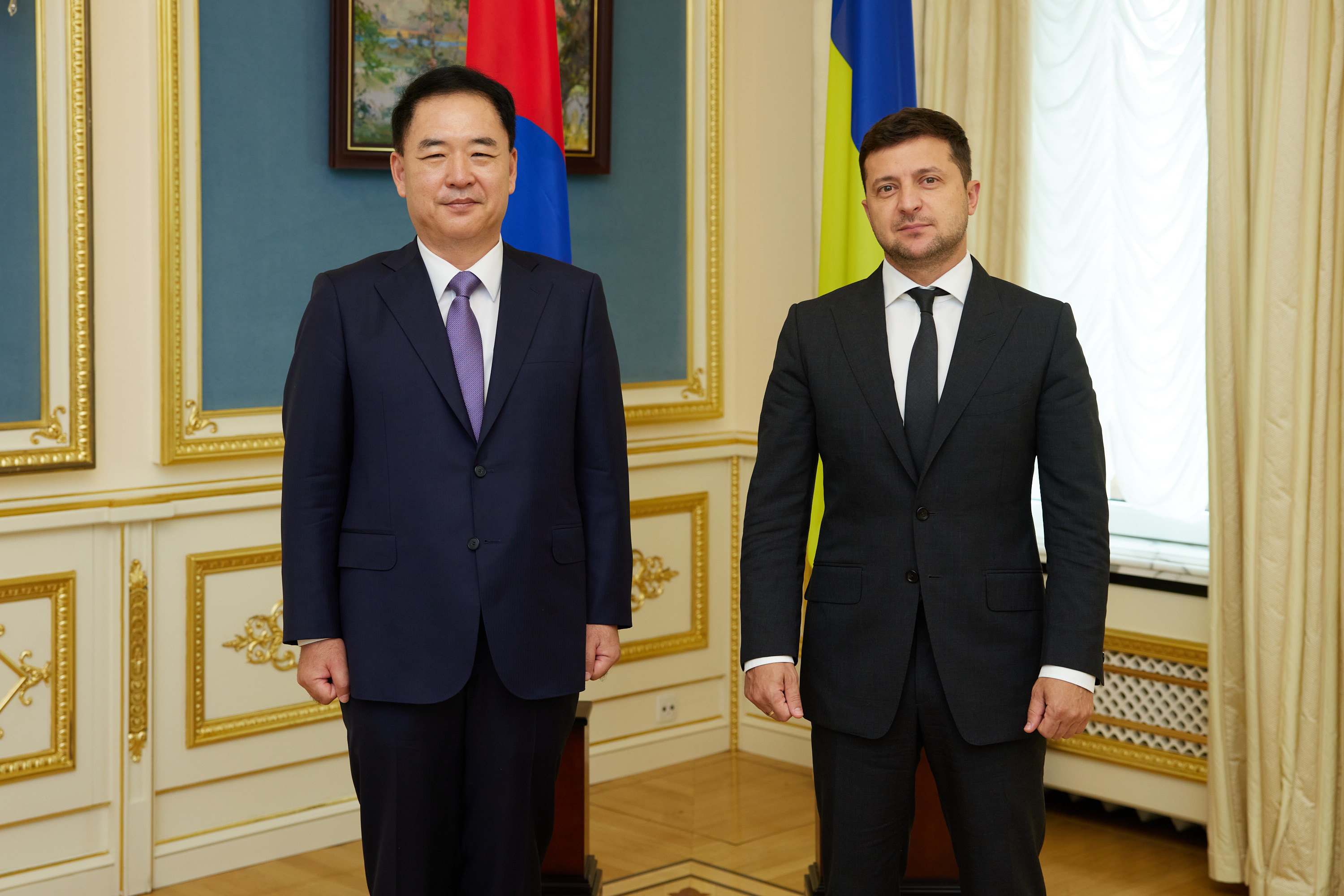
South Korean Ambassador to Ukraine and President of Ukraine in Kyiv, Ukraine on 2021

Diplomatic relations between South Korea and Ukraine were established on February 10, 1992. South Korea has an embassy in Kyiv. Ukraine has an embassy in Seoul.

== Political relations ==
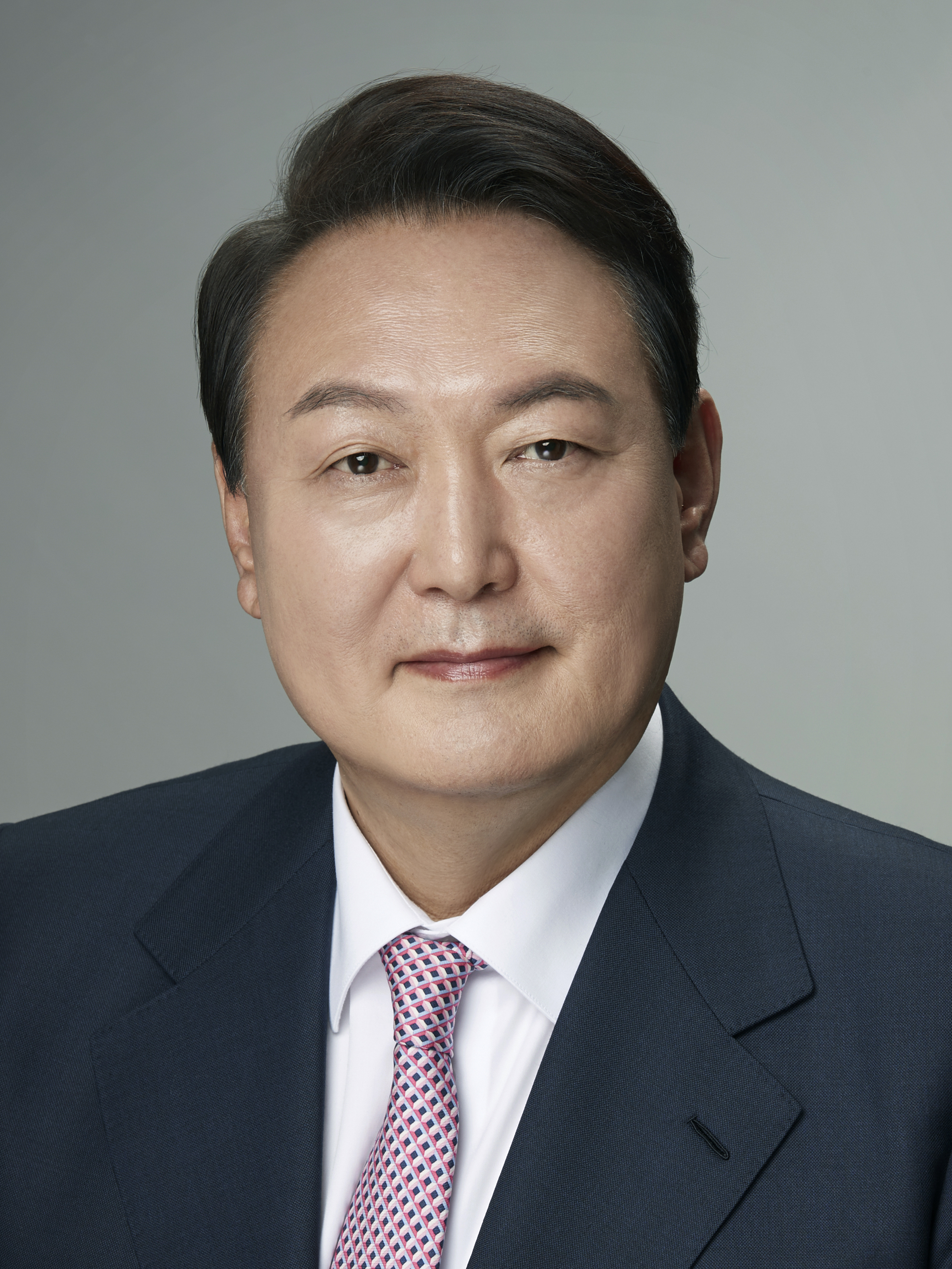
Yoon Suk Yeol, the former President of South Korea, made a surprise visit to Ukraine on July 15, 2023

Ukraine declared its independence on August 24, 1991, with the dissolution of the Soviet Union, On December 30, 1991, the South Korean government recognized Ukraine as a sovereign state. South Korea and Ukraine established diplomatic relations on February 10, 1992. On July 31, 1992, the government of the Republic of Korea established the Embassy of South Korea in Ukraine in Kyiv, In October 1997, the Ukrainian government established the Embassy of Ukraine in South Korea in Seoul. Since then, the Republic of Korea and Ukraine have maintained friendly relations, with reciprocal visits by high-ranking officials from both countries.

On February 24, 2022, South Korea's Blue House held a National Security Council chaired by Suh Hoon, then director of South Korea's Office of National Security, to discuss measures regarding the Russian invasion of Ukraine. Moon Jae-in, President of the Republic of Korea, said, "Russia's invasion of Ukraine cannot be justified under any circumstances. South Korea will work for a peaceful resolution of the situation, such as economic sanctions against Russia." The Ministry of Foreign Affairs also issued a spokesperson statement, saying, "We strongly condemn Russia's invasion of Ukraine, which constitutes an act in violation of the Charter of the United Nations. " and joins the international community's economic sanctions against Russia. The Ministry of Economy and Finance announced that it will impose sanctions on Sberbank and the six largest Russian banks (VEB. RF, Sberbank (PSB), VTB Bank, Otkritie, Sovcom, and Novikom). The Financial Services Commission said it would also suspend transactions with Rossiya Bank as of March 7, 2022.

Since the start of the Russo-Ukrainian war, the South Korean government has stated that Ukraine's sovereignty, independence, and territorial integrity must be respected. Therefore, it does not recognize the Russian annexation of Crimea in 2014, the independence of the pro-Russian separatist republics in the Donbas (DPR and LPR), nor the Russian annexation of four Ukrainian oblasts (Donetsk, Kherson, Luhansk, and Zaporizhzhia) in September 2022.

== Travel ==
The Ukrainian government provides visa-free entry for up to 90 days within a 180-day period, for South Korean nationals with a South Korean passport. However, on February 13, 2022, the South Korean government designated Ukraine as a travel ban country due to escalating military tensions with Russia. Ukrainian citizens with Ukrainian passports must apply for a visa to enter South Korea. However, if they hold a diplomatic or tolerance passport, they can enter South Korea without a visa and stay for up to 90 days.

== Trade relations ==
Since 1998, Korean exports to Ukraine have generally grown each year, except for a decline in 1999. However, due to the 2008 financial crisis, there was a significant 76.0% drop in 2009. Following that, Korean exports to Ukraine experienced steady growth, but starting in 2013, the country's exports declined sharply as the Ukrainian economy faced challenges from the Revolution of Dignity and War in Donbass

As of October 2019, South Korea's total investment in Ukraine amounted to $37 million (78 deals), mainly focused on car, mobile computing, and home appliance sales. In 2019, over 20 Korean companies, including Samsung Electronics, LG Electronics, Hyundai Motor Company, Hyundai Rotem, Youngsan Corporation, POSCO, Ecovice, OSSTEM and Hankook, were operating within Ukraine.

According to the MIT Media Lab Economic Complexity Observatory, South Korea's exports to Ukraine were valued at $479 million in 2020, mainly manufactured goods such as automobiles and various machinery. On the other hand, Ukraine exported $382 million to South Korea, mainly corn, wheat, and other food crops.

Top 10 Export Items from South Korea to Ukraine (Unit: Thousand USD, %)
Rank	HS Code	Item	2017 (Amount, Thousand USD)	2017 (Growth Rate, %)	2018 (1–6 months)(Amount, Thousand USD)	2018 (1–6 months)(Growth Rate, %)
1	7411	Car	46,932	3.7	33,050	22.6
2	2140	Synthetic resin	24,584	11.1	16,205	32.5
3	6134	Hot-dip galvanization	16,643	71.9	13,831	48.8
4	3203	Tire	21,316	30.7	12,876	9.1
5	7420	Automotive Parts	21,547	-2.8	10,059	-2.6
6	7251	Heavy equipment	8,996	65.9	9,350	124.2
7	3109	Plastic	11,867	2.3	6,764	19.9
8	8414	Distribution control panel	3,839	0	6,760	5,408,041.60
9	2273	Cosmetic	6,841	72	5,206	93.6
10	4111	Polyester fiber	4,659	24.6	3,801	112.3

Top 10 Import Items from Ukraine to South Korea (Unit: Thousand USD, %)
Rank	HS Code	Item	2017 (Amount, Thousand USD)	2017 (Growth Rate, %)	2018 (1–6 months) (Amount, Thousand USD)	2018 (1–6 months)(Growth Rate, %)
1	136	Fodder	273,740	2.2	73,990	-52
2	1120	Steel	95,342	81.3	45,013	-10.4
3	6181	Alloy	56,012	71.7	16,810	-57.6
4	312	Lumber	28,826	95.5	10,576	-14.5
5	135	By-product feed	5,551	25.3	4,673	28.5
6	1190	Mineral	4,342	-7.7	3,455	31.4
7	131	Vegetable oil	5,277	-35.5	3,285	22.9
8	8137	Software	4,512	-5.2	2,104	142.5
9	2289	Fine chemical	6,454	-64.2	1,874	-22.2
10	8259	Heating equipment	1,898	7,590,904.00	1,839	185.9

== Culture relations ==
=== Television ===
Since 2008, when Ukraine (TV channel) aired "슬픈연가," "대장금," "다모," and "태양의 여자" to high ratings, interest in Korean dramas has steadily grown, and in 2017, five Korean dramas were imported and remade into local formats by major Ukrainian broadcasters, achieving the highest ratings of their time.

=== Movies ===
With the spread of the Korean Wave in Ukraine, interest in Cinema of Korea has increased. In 2008, Kyiv hosted the first Korean film festival, and in 2016, a film about North Korean defectors was chosen to screen at the Molodist (Kyiv International Documentary Film Festival). This film attracted a lot of attention from Ukrainian media. With the screenings of Park Chan-wook's "The Handmaiden" in 2016 and Bong Joon-ho's "Parasite" as the Odesa International Film Festival's opening film in 2019, South Korean cinema is growing in popularity in Ukraine.

=== Korean language ===
Korean language departments were established in 1998 at Kyiv National Linguistic University and Taras Shevchenko National University of Kyiv. A Korea Education Institution, which is crucial to the growth and spread of Korean language instruction in Ukraine, was established in Kyiv in March 2017. In September 2018, the University of Customs and Finance in Ukraine's industrial hub of Dnipro also established a Korean language department. Every year, there are more Korean majors and trainees. The Korea Education Institution, founded in 2017, had about 200 students in its first year and doubled to about 400 in 2019.

=== Korean cuisine ===
Over 30,000 Koryo-saram reside in Ukraine, so there is a portion of the population that is familiar with some Korean cuisine. The Embassy of the Republic of Korea in Ukraine organized a successful 'Taste of Korea' event in 2017, and in 2018, the embassy made efforts to promote Korean cuisine, including a presentation of Korean cuisine at a cultural event commemorating the Pyeongchang 2018 Winter Olympics.

== People-to-people relations ==
=== Koryo-saram ===
A larger migration started in the 1980s when Koryo-saram from Central Asia started moving to Ukraine for seasonal agricultural work. Koryo-saram first arrived in Ukraine in the 1950s to study abroad and work, but the migration really took off in those years. The Koryo-saram population was 12,711 in 2001, per a census survey in Ukraine. ROK Ministry of Foreign Affairs projects that there will be about 30,000 Koryo-saram as of 2019, including unregistered or stateless Koryo-saram, according to their estimates. The Koryo-saram organization has put the number at 15,631.

=== Expatriates ===
As of January 2020, there were approximately 612 people in Ukraine according to the Ukrainian Immigration Office (based on those staying for 3 months or longer). This includes 41 permanent residents, about 110 individuals involved in local offices and personal businesses, around 128 missionaries, about 179 international students, 97 people in Ukrainian and foreign records, and 57 people working in government agencies (such as embassies and KOTRA). On February 8, 2022, the Ministry of Foreign Affairs announced that there are 354 people from Korea residing in Ukraine. The Ministry also noted that the number of expatriates has been decreasing.

== Russian invasion of Ukraine ==
=== Before invasion ===
On 25 January 2022 (Tuesday), the Ministry of Foreign Affairs decided to upgrade the travel advisory for 12 provinces in southeastern Ukraine to Level 3 (travel recommendation) as part of strengthening safety measures for South Korean citizens. Travel advisories at Level 3 (travel recommendation) were already applied to Crimea and Donbas within Ukraine, but were later expanded to 15 oblasts of Ukraine (Crimea, Luhansk, Donetsk, Volyn, Rivne, Zhytomyr, Kyiv, Chernihiv, Sumy, Kharkiv, Dnipropetrovsk, Zaporizhia, Kherson, Odesa, and Mykolaiv). The South Korean Embassy in Ukraine contacted South Korean expatriates residing in Ukraine to check on their safety status and re-examine emergency communication networks. In addition, the embassy secured water and emergency food supplies in cooperation with the embassies of other countries, and updated evacuation and support plans for expatriates in case of an emergency. On February 13, the Ministry of Foreign Affairs (South Korea) decided to urgently issue a travel alert level 4 (travel ban) for all regions of Ukraine. On February 22, the Korean Ministry of Foreign Affairs released an official statement.

=== After invasion ===
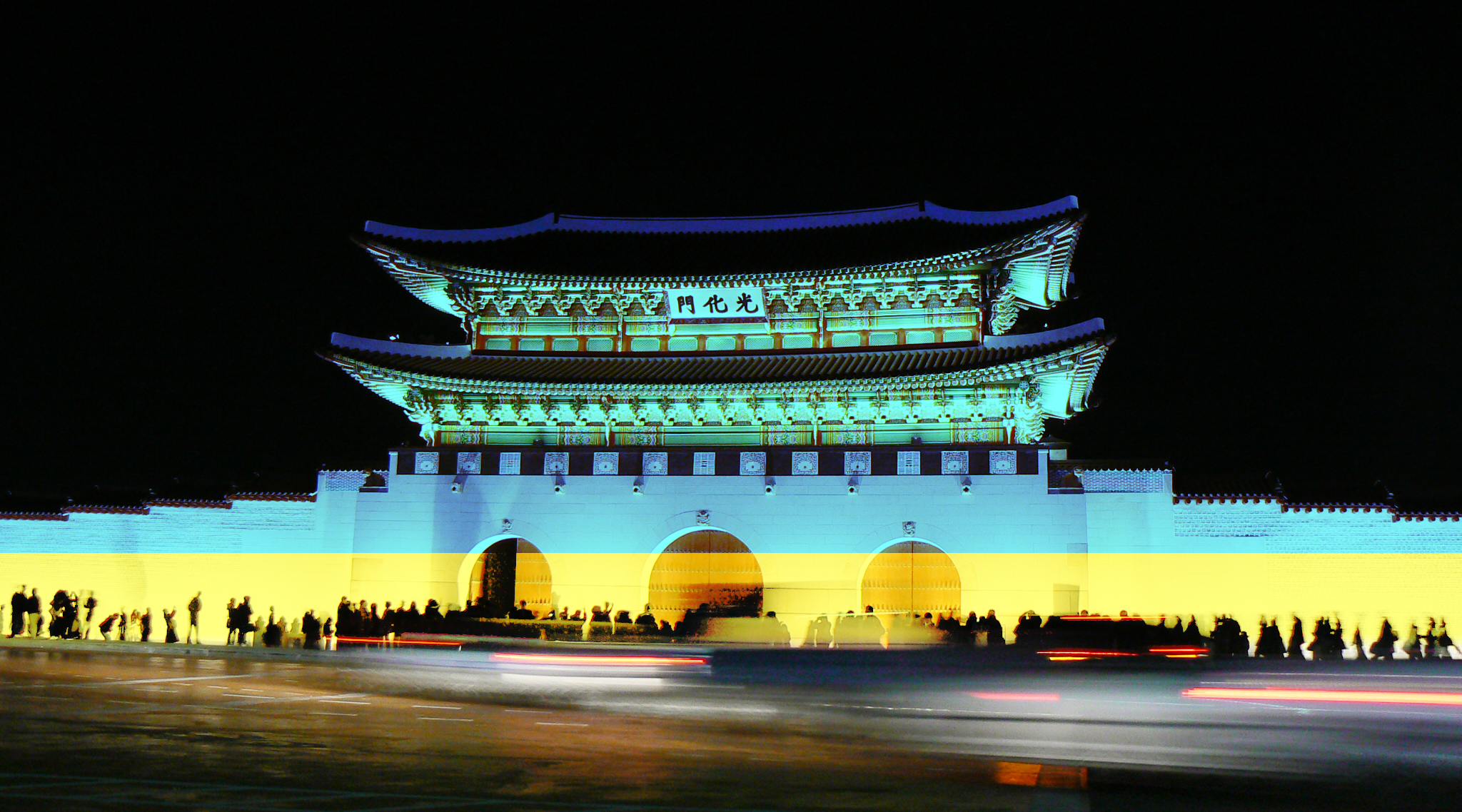
Gwanghwamun palace, nighttime illumination in the colors of the Ukrainian flag, 2022

On February 24, the Ministry of Foreign Affairs released an official statement condemning the invasion of Ukraine.

The Republic of Korea Embassy in Ukraine noted that beginning on March 8, Korea sent emergency medical supplies to Ukraine as part of their $10 million in humanitarian assistance commitment. Ukrainian president Volodymyr Zelenskyy thanked Moon Jae-in on March 3 via a telephone conversation.

ROK Embassy in Ukraine published an article about a phone conversation between Chung Eui-yong, the Korean minister of foreign affairs, and Dmytro Kuleba, the Ukrainian minister of foreign affairs, on April 15. Minister Chung explained the support provided by Korea and its future plans. Minister Kuleba expressed gratitude for Korea's solidarity and support, and both sides agreed to strengthen bilateral cooperation.

ROK Embassy in Ukraine reported that the Korean government sent approximately 20 tons of additional humanitarian aid to Ukraine on April 19. The aid is intended to provide assistance to the Ukrainian people and refugees who are experiencing severe crisis as a result of Russia's continued invasion. The Korean government is collaborating closely with the Ukrainian embassy in Korea to determine the specifics of the aid, and is prioritizing Ukraine's requests in selecting items. The Korean government hopes that this aid will help alleviate the suffering of the Ukrainian people and refugees, and has expressed its willingness to provide further assistance if necessary.

On April 18, 2023, Reuters reported that South Korean President Yoon Suk Yeol had said South Korea might extend its support for Ukraine if the country comes under large-scale civilian attack. This marked the first indication that Seoul might be willing to provide weapons to Ukraine. President Yoon explained that while considering South Korea's relationship with the parties engaged in the war and the developments in the battlefield, they will take the most appropriate measures.

In May 2023, during the Asian Leadership Conference both the Government of Ukraine and the Republic of Korea signed an agreement for loans from the Economic Development Cooperation Fund, a division of the Export–Import Bank of Korea. The loan included US$300 million within 3–4 months and additional funds in 2024, with gradually increasing amounts as projects are completed in Ukraine. During the visit, first deputy prime minister and minister of economy, Yulia Svyrydenko, met with representatives from various Korean businesses, including Hyundai Motors, the latter of which they discussed the possibility of building electric vehicle manufacturing plants in Ukraine.

On June 22, 2023, South Korea's Government Policy Coordination Minister, Bang Moon-kyu, attended a conference in London focused on Ukraine's post-war recovery, pledging an additional $130 million in aid this year on top of last year's $100 million contribution. The conference convened officials from 61 countries, leaders of 33 international organizations, and approximately 400 companies to discuss support for Ukraine's reconstruction following Russia's invasion, with a strong emphasis on the private sector's role in the recovery.

=== Dispute ===
Despite ROK government's effort to Ukraine, there are some concerns that the ROK does not truly support Ukraine. Korea has promised $100 million in humanitarian aid to Ukraine, but has not offered to supply any weapons. A representative for the ROK Ministry of National Defense said that the nation is not planning to offer direct military assistance. Nevertheless, South Korea negotiated one of its biggest ever arms deals—a multibillion-dollar one—with Poland in August to deliver tanks and howitzers. Poland has been one of the main military suppliers to Ukraine. South Korea has also taken action to help the Ukrainian people and their refugees. South Korea sent $100 million in help to Ukraine during the first several months of the conflict, including supplies for children's immunizations, emergency medical supplies, and electrical generators. Rather than sending weapons directly to Ukraine, South Korea has given the go-ahead for the export of weapons or parts of weapons that are not entirely Korean in origin but do contain South Korean components. Additionally, it has reportedly agreed to sell more ammunition to Washington and has sold ammunition to the US for transfer to Ukraine.

Leaked US documents reveal a conversation between President Yoon's foreign affairs secretary, Yi Mun-hui, and the former National Security Advisor, Kim Sung-han, raising concerns about the destination of ammunition. They feared that the US might not be the intended recipient, and were also worried about a potential call from President Biden to President Yoon regarding the issue. Changing South Korea's weapons policy towards Ukraine could be seen as yielding to US pressure. In light of this, Mr. Kim suggested exploring the possibility of selling shells to Poland instead, as the speedy delivery of ammunition to Ukraine remained the United States' primary objective.

=== Supply of weapons components ===
Following the Russian invasion of Ukraine, Ukraine asked South Korea for aid. As noted in October 2022 South Korea had provided Ukraine with some resources, but refused to supply lethal weaponry. Even until March 2023 the South Korean government refused to supply Ukraine with lethal weaponry because of a decades-old legal prohibition on this practice to any parties involved in conflict. However, as of April 2023, the government would supply weapons components.

In an interview on 18 April 2023 South Korean president Yoon Suk Yeol said his country "might extend its support for Ukraine beyond humanitarian and economic aid if it comes under a large-scale civilian attack". Said Yoon: "If there is a situation the international community cannot condone, such as any large-scale attack on civilians, massacre or serious violation of the laws of war, it might be difficult for us to insist only on humanitarian or financial support."

On 20 June 2024, South Korean National Security Advisor Chang Ho-jin, after the visit to North Korea by Russian President Putin, said his country planned to "reconsider the issue of arms support to Ukraine".

== State and official visits ==
=== State and official visits to South Korea by Ukraine ===
Date	Visits
1994.7	Prozhivalskiy, Head of Postal Services (attended UPU General Assembly)
1995.3	Moroz, Chairman of the Supreme Council
1995.11	Storizhko, Minister of Science and Technology
1995.11	Udovenko, Minister of Foreign Affairs
1996.12	Kuchma, President of Ukraine
2000.5	Shatkovskvi, Deputy Minister of Internal Affairs (military secrecy protection agreement negotiation)
2000.6	Kremen, Minister of Education and Science
2000.11	Plyusch, Chairman of the Supreme Council
2001.3	Kuchma, President of Ukraine's spouse
2001.4	Kravchuk, former president of Ukraine
2001.10	Svmonenko, Head of Audit Chamber
2003.12	Shnypko, Deputy Minister of the Cabinet, and Kuleba, Deputy Minister of Foreign Affairs for Asia-Pacific (2nd Korea-Ukraine Joint Trade Committee)
2004.6	Gryshchenko, Minister of Foreign Affairs (Ukraine)
2006.12	State visit of Yushchenko, President of Ukraine
2008.7	Tabashnik, Member of Parliament (KOICA training)
2009.5	Lutsenko, Minister of Internal Affairs
2009.7	Tymoshenko, Prime Minister
2010.12	Lytvyn, Speaker of the National Assembly
2012.3	Yanukovych, President of Ukraine
2015.9	Klimkin, Minister of Foreign Affairs (Ukraine)
2016.6	Larin, Chairman of Ukraine-Korea Parliamentary Friendship Association
2017.9	Hrynevych, Minister of Education
2017.10	Omelnyk, Minister of Infrastructure
2018.2	Avakov, Minister of Internal Affairs
2018.4	Kubiv, Deputy Prime Minister for Economic Affairs
2018.12	Parubiy, Speaker of the National Assembly
2023.5	Olena Zelenska, First lady of Ukraine
2023.10	South Korea-Ukraine Parliamentary Friendship Association delegation

=== State and official visits to Ukraine by South Korea ===
Date	Visits
1992.6.	Lee Sang-ok, Minister of Foreign Affairs
1995.7	Choi Jong-hwan, Chairman of Korean-CIS (Commonwealth of Independent States) Economic Association (leading an economic delegation)
1995.8	South Korea-Ukraine Parliamentary Friendship Association delegation (led by Shin Jae-gi)
1998.9	South Korea-Ukraine Parliamentary Friendship Association delegation (led by Kim Young-jin)
1998.9	Han Deok-soo, Chief Trade Negotiator (1st Korea-Ukraine Joint Trade Committee)
2001.7	Kim Young-hwan, Minister of Science and ICT (1st Ministry of Science and ICT Joint Committee, nuclear cooperation agreement signed)
2001.8	Choi Sung-hong, Vice Minister of Foreign Affairs
2001.11	South Korea-Ukraine Parliamentary Friendship Association delegation (including Kim Young-jin and five others)
2002.4	Kim Jong-ho, Vice Speaker of the National Assembly
2002.8	National Assembly Industry Resources Committee delegation (led by Chairman Park Sang-gyu)
2004.4	Jeon Yun-chul, Speaker of the Board of Audit and Inspection
2005.10	Lee Hae-chan, Prime Minister of South Korea
2006.8	Jeong Sang-myung, Prosecutor General of South Korea
2006.10	Lim Chae-jung, Speaker of the National Assembly of South Korea
2011.3	Land, Infrastructure and Transport Committee delegation (led by Song Kwang-ho)
2011.4	Min Dong-seok, Vice Minister of Foreign Affairs
2011.7	Strategy and Finance Committee delegation (led by Kim Sung-jo)
2011.9	Kim Hwang-sik, Prime Minister of South Korea
2013.10	Kang Chang-hee, Speaker of the National Assembly of South Korea
2015.3	Cho Jung-sik, Chairman of South Korea-Ukraine Parliamentary Friendship Association
2017.11	Cho Byung-je, Speaker of the Korea National Diplomatic Academy
2023.7	Yoon Suk-Yeol, President of South Korea (See more: 2023 visit by Yoon Suk Yeol to Ukraine)

== Status ==
=== Trade ===
South Korea - Ukraine Trade Status (thousand dollars, %)
Category	2015	2016	2017	2018 (1–6 months)
Total trade	855,835 (-22.0)	694,604 (-18.8)	797,873 (14.8)	352,038 (-1.9)
Exports	194,367 (-42.6)	222,247 (14.3)	258,560 (16.3)	175,488 (39)
Imports	661,468 (-12.8)	472,357 (-28.6)	539,313 (14.2)	176,550 (-42.8)
Balance	-467,101 (-11.2)	-250,110 (46.4)	-280,754 (-12.2)	-1,062 (-9.9)

Annual South Korea's Trade with Ukraine (thousand dollars, %)
Year	Exports Amount	Exports Growth Rate	Imports Amount	Imports Growth Rate
1998	197,096	9.3	-	-
1999	91,877	-53.4	228,502	35.3
2000	144,949	57.8	320,026	40.1
2001	173,407	19.6	194,874	-39.1
2002	220,345	27.1	230,225	18.1
2003	357,605	62.3	242,677	5.4
2004	493,242	37.9	583,520	40.5
2005	686,745	39.2	280,363	-52
2006	884,480	28.8	218,424	-22.1
2007	1,546,189	74.8	294,658	34.9
2008	1,773,294	14.7	824,429	79.8
2009	426,435	-76	792,950	-3.8
2010	714,221	67.5	779,726	-1.7
2011	1,022,531	43.2	732,833	-6
2012	1,149,468	23.7	757,841	3.4
2013	634,596	-44.8	448,047	-40.8
2014	338,809	-46.6	758,582	69.3
2015	194,367	-42.6	661,468	-12.8
2016	222,247	14.3	472,357	-28.6
2017	258,560	16.3	539,313	14.1
2018 (1–6 months)	175,488	39	176,550	-42.8

=== Agreement in force (date of entry into force) ===
Date	Agreement in force
1994.5.20.	Science and Technology Cooperation Agreement
1995.11.30.	Agreement on Cooperation between Ministries of Foreign Affairs
1995.5.15.	Agreement on Cooperation between Ministries of Information and Communication
1996.12.	Memorandum of Understanding for the Establishment of a Joint Trade Committee between Ministries of Industry and Trade
1997.4.5.	Trade Agreement
1997.11.3.	Investment Promotion and Protection Agreement
2001.10.	Commercial Multiple Visa Agreement
2002.3.19	Double Taxation Avoidance Agreement
2003.3.6.	Air Services Agreement
2004.4.27.	Customs Agreement
2005.10.25.	Military Secret Information Protection Agreement
2006.9.15.	Diplomatic Passport Holder Visa Exemption Agreement
2006.10.20.	Grant Aid and Technical Cooperation Agreement
2007.6.11.	Nuclear Energy Agreement
2007.8.20	Space Cooperation Agreement
2007.8.29.	Defense and Military Cooperation Agreement
2009.7.8.	Tourism Agreement
2009.8.3.	Cultural Agreement
2009.8.2.	Maritime Agreement
2014.9.17.	Visa Exemption Agreement for Official and Service Passport Holders

=== Consultative Body ===
Status of Consultative Body	Conference Date & Place
Korea-Ukraine Policy Consultation	1st Meeting: September 1996, Kyiv
Korea-Ukraine Policy Consultation	2nd Meeting: November 2002, Seoul
Korea-Ukraine Policy Consultation	3rd Meeting: December 2004, Kyiv
Korea-Ukraine Policy Consultation	4th Meeting: October 2006, Kyiv
Korea-Ukraine Policy Consultation	5th Meeting: February 2009, Seoul
Korea-Ukraine Policy Consultation	6th Meeting: March 2010, Kyiv
Korea-Ukraine Policy Consultation	7th Meeting: February 2012, Seoul
Korea-Ukraine Policy Consultation	8th Meeting: May 2019, Seoul
Korea-Ukraine Trade and Economic Cooperation	1st Meeting: December 2011, Seoul
Korea-Ukraine Trade and Economic Cooperation	2nd Meeting: November 2012, Kyiv
Korea-Ukraine Trade and Economic Cooperation	3rd Meeting: August 2016, Kyiv
Korea-Ukraine Trade and Economic Cooperation	4th Meeting: April 2018, Seoul
Korea-Ukraine Joint Trade Committee	1st Meeting: September 1998, Kyiv
Korea-Ukraine Joint Trade Committee	2nd Meeting: December 2003, Seoul
Korea-Ukraine Joint Trade Committee	3rd Meeting: November 2006, Seoul
Korea-Ukraine Joint Trade Committee	4th Meeting: October 2008, Kyiv (Upgraded to 'Intergovernmental Trade and Economic Cooperation Committee')
Korea-Ukraine Joint Science Committee	1st Meeting: July 2001, Kyiv
Korea-Ukraine Joint Science Committee	2nd Meeting: June 2005, Seoul
Korea-Ukraine Joint Science Committee	3rd Meeting: June 2007, Kyiv
Korea-Ukraine Joint Science Committee	4th Meeting: December 2012, Seoul
Korea-Ukraine Joint Science Committee	5th Meeting: March 2017, Kyiv

== See also ==
- Foreign relations of South Korea
- Foreign relations of Ukraine
- Koreans in Ukraine
- North Korea–Ukraine relations
- Russia–South Korea relations
