= Serhii Kamyshev =

Ukrainian diplomat (1956–2021)

- Сергій Камишев

Ambassador to China
- In office 17 May 2019 – 14 February 2021
- Preceded by: Oleh Dyomin
- Succeeded by: Zhanna Leshchynska (provisional); Pavlo Riabikin

Personal details
- Born: 8 April 1956 Dnipropetrovsk, Ukrainian SSR
- Died: 14 February 2021 (aged 64) Zhangjiakou, China
- Education: Donetsk State University

Serhii Oleksiyovych Kamyshev (Ukrainian: Сергій Олексійович Камишев; 8 April 1956 – 14 February 2021) was a Ukrainian diplomat, Ambassador Extraordinary and Plenipotentiary of Ukraine to the People's Republic of China.

== Biography ==
He was born on 8 April 1956 in Dnipropetrovsk. In 1977 Serhii Kamyshev graduated from the Donetsk State University (Faculty of Economics); in 1993 – from the Diplomatic Academy of the Ministry of Foreign Affairs of the Russian Federation.

== Career ==
1977-1990 – he held different positions in the coal mining state enterprises, Donetsk (Ukraine)

1990-1991 – he was Deputy Head of the Kirov District Council of People's Deputies, the City of Donetsk

1993-1994 – chief consultant on international relations, the Donetsk Board of Directors of Enterprises and Entities

March–June 1994 – First Secretary, Department of International Economic, Scientific and Technical Cooperation, Ministry of Foreign Affairs of Ukraine

1994-1998 – First Secretary, Counsellor, Embassy of Ukraine in the Arab Republic of Egypt

1998-2001 – Minister-Counsellor, Charge d'Affaires of Ukraine in the Lebanese Republic and Charge d'Affaires of Ukraine in the Syrian Arab Republic (non-resident)

2001-2002 – Director, Fifth Territorial Department (Asia and Pacific, Middle East and Africa), MFA of Ukraine

2002-2003 – Director General, Directorate General of Bilateral Cooperation, MFA of Ukraine

2003-2004 – Ambassador at Large, MFA of Ukraine

2004-2009 – he was Ambassador of Ukraine to the People's Republic of China, Ambassador of Ukraine to Mongolia (non-resident)

2009-2010 – Director of the Consular Department, the MFA of Ukraine

2010-2011 – Deputy Minister of the Cabinet of Ministers of Ukraine

2011-2014 – Deputy Head of the Secretariat of the Cabinet of Ministers of Ukraine

August–December 2019 – he was Advisor to the Head of the Office of the President of Ukraine

From 18 December 2019 – he was Ambassador Extraordinary and Plenipotentiary of Ukraine to the People's Republic of China.

He died on 14 February 2021 from a massive heart attack.
