= Mykhailo Reznik =

Ukrainian diplomat (1950–2025)

- Михайло Резнік

Ambassador of Ukraine to the United States
- In office 2003–2005
- Prime Minister: Viktor Yanukovych
- Preceded by: Kostyantyn Gryshchenko
- Succeeded by: Sergiy Korsunsky
- President: Leonid Kuchma

Ambassador of Ukraine to China
- In office 2001–2003
- President: Leonid Kuchma
- Preceded by: Ihor Lytvyn
- Succeeded by: Sergiy Kamyshev

Ambassador of Ukraine to Korea
- In office 1997–2001
- President: Leonid Kuchma
- Preceded by: Sergiy Korsunsky
- Succeeded by: Volodymyr Furkalo

Personal details
- Born: 5 February 1950 Kyiv, Ukrainian SSR, USSR
- Died: 1 November 2025 (aged 75)
- Education: Kyiv National University of Trade and Economics

Mykhailo Borisovich Reznik (Ukrainian: Михайло Борисович Резнік; 5 February 1950 – 1 November 2025) was a Ukrainian diplomat. He served as Ambassador of Ukraine to China from 2001 to 2003 and Ambassador of Ukraine to the United States from 2003 until 2005.

== Background ==
Mykhailo Reznik was born on 5 February 1950, in Kyiv, Ukrainian SSR, Soviet Union. He graduated from Kyiv Trade and Economics Institute in 1972. Later, he graduated from the Academy of Management and Special Courses of the Stanford Graduate School of Business and the Washington Two-Year School of Foreign Languages.

Reznik died on 1 November 2025, at the age of 75.

== Career ==
From 1972 to 1993, Reznik worked for the Ministry of Trade of Ukraine, held senior positions in the Kyiv City and Republican Main Department of Public Catering, and headed a production and export-import association.

From 1993 to 1994 – First Deputy Minister of Foreign Economic Relations of Ukraine. From 1994 to 1997 – Trade Representative of Ukraine to the United States.

From September 1997 to October 2001 – Ambassador Extraordinary and Plenipotentiary of Ukraine to Korea. From October 2001 to November 2003 – Ambassador Extraordinary and Plenipotentiary of Ukraine to China. From 2002 to November 2003 – Ambassador Extraordinary and Plenipotentiary of Ukraine to the DPRK.

From June 2002 to November 2003 – Ambassador Extraordinary and Plenipotentiary of Ukraine to Mongolia. From November 2003 to 2005 – Ambassador Extraordinary and Plenipotentiary of Ukraine to the United States of America. From July 2004 to 2005 – Ambassador Extraordinary and Plenipotentiary of Ukraine to Antigua and Barbuda with concurrent appointment. President of the Association of Automobile Manufacturers of Ukraine "Ukravtoprom".
