= Vadym Prystaiko =

Ukrainian diplomat (born 1970)

- Вадим Пристайко
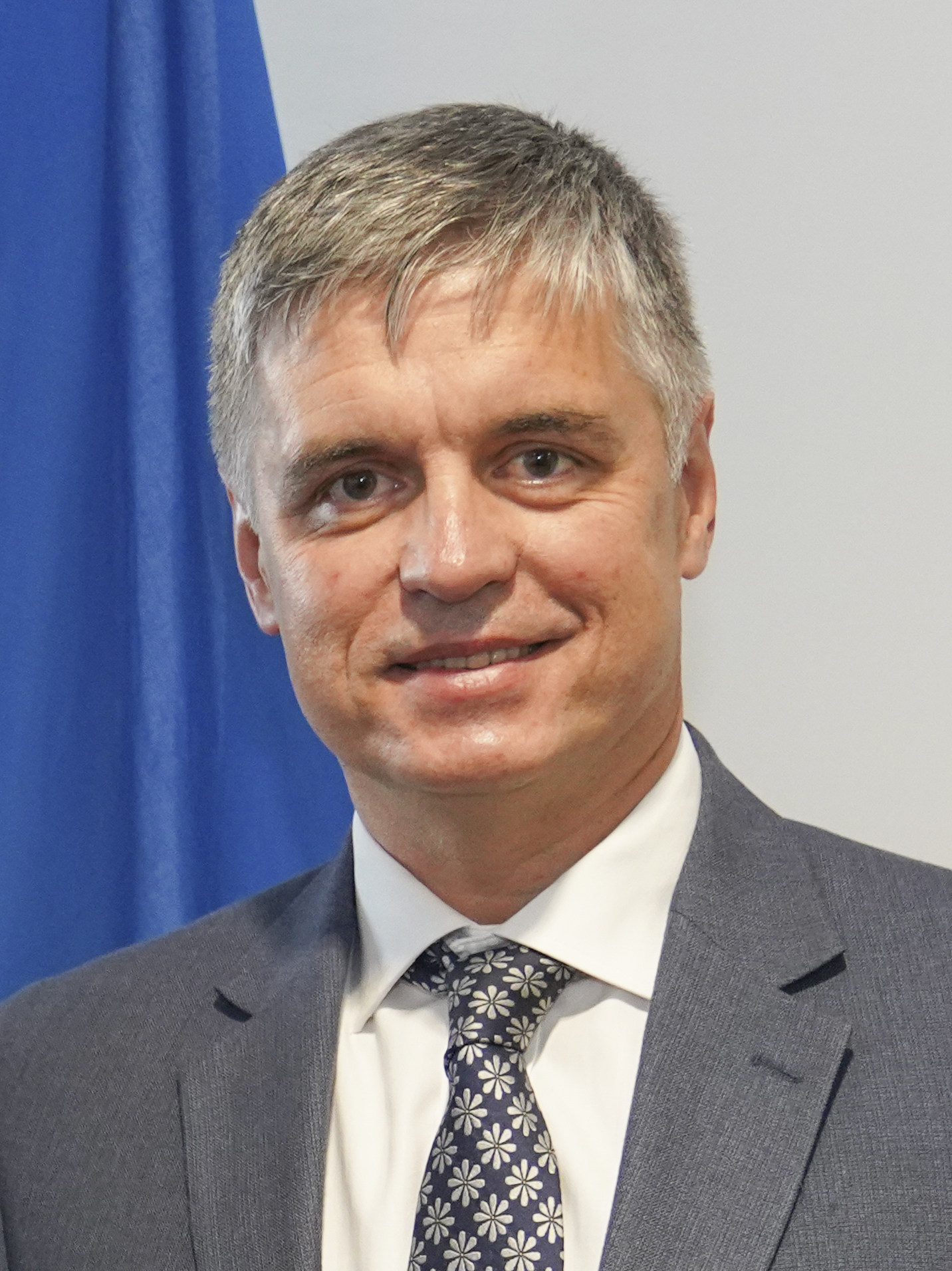
- Prystaiko in 2023

Ukrainian Ambassador to the United Kingdom
- In office 20 July 2020 – 21 July 2023
- President: Volodymyr Zelenskyy
- Prime Minister: Denys Shmyhal
- Preceded by: Natalia Galibarenko
- Succeeded by: Valerii Zaluzhnyi

First Vice Prime Minister of Ukraine for European Relations
- In office 4 March 2020 – 4 June 2020
- President: Volodymyr Zelenskyy
- Prime Minister: Denys Shmyhal
- Preceded by: Dmytro Kuleba
- Succeeded by: Olha Stefanishyna

Minister of Foreign Affairs
- In office 29 August 2019 – 4 March 2020
- President: Volodymyr Zelenskyy
- Prime Minister: Oleksiy Honcharuk
- Preceded by: Pavlo Klimkin
- Succeeded by: Dmytro Kuleba

Ukrainian Ambassador to Canada
- In office 8 November 2012 – 26 November 2014
- Preceded by: Ihor Ostash
- Succeeded by: Andriy Shevchenko

Ukrainian Ambassador to NATO
- In office 7 July 2017 – 29 August 2019
- Preceded by: Yehor Bozhok

Personal details
- Born: 20 February 1970 (age 56) Kiliya, Ukrainian SSR, Soviet Union
- Party: Independent
- Education: Igor Sikorsky Kyiv Polytechnic Institute

Vadym Volodymyrovych Prystaiko (Ukrainian: Вадим Володимирович Пристайко, IPA: [wɐˈdɪm woloˈdɪmɪrowɪtʃ prɪˈstɑjko]; born 20 February 1970) is a Ukrainian diplomat who was Ukraine's ambassador to the United Kingdom. He was appointed by President Volodymyr Zelenskyy on 20 July 2020 and held the position until he was dismissed by Zelenskyy three years later.

Prystaiko is a former Minister of Foreign Affairs of Ukraine and former Deputy Foreign Minister of Ukraine. Between 2014 and 2019, he was also the Ukrainian ambassador to Canada between 2012 and 2014 and the head of the Mission of Ukraine to NATO from 7 July 2017 to 29 August 2019. In May 2019, Prystaiko served as the Deputy Head of the Presidential Administration for foreign policy issues. He is a member of the National Security and Defense Council of Ukraine since 31 May 2019. He is also former Vice Prime Minister for European and Euro-Atlantic Integration of Ukraine, serving from 4 March 2020 to 4 June 2020.

== Early life ==
Prystaiko was born on 20 February 1970 in the city of Kiliya (Odesa Oblast), Ukrainian SSR, Soviet Union. He went to school in Odesa, Kyiv, and Zaporizhia. Eventually, the family settled in Kyiv.

In 1994, Prystaiko graduated cum laude from the Kyiv Polytechnic Institute's Faculty of Computer Science. In 1998, he received a master's degree from the Ukrainian State University of Finance and International Trade. In addition to his native Ukrainian, he is fluent in Russian and English.

== Career ==
Prystaiko began his career in the private business sector. He was a co-founder of one of the first Ukrainian Internet providers and electronic media Electronni Visti.

In 1994, following his family's tradition of government service, he obtained a position at the Ministry of Foreign Economic Relations of Ukraine. At that time, the Ministry was expanding rapidly as Ukraine began to negotiate with GATT/WTO.

In 1997, he took a position in the economic section of the Ministry of Foreign Affairs of Ukraine, where he tried to develop trade with Asian countries. It was the most important task because, at that time, the Ministry initiated negotiations on Ukraine's accession to the GATT/WTO and started to look for new opportunities for Ukrainian business in the markets, especially in Africa and Asia. In 1997, he moved to the Asia-Pacific Department of the Ministry of Foreign Affairs.

In 2000, Prystaiko became a consul to Sydney, Australia, where he was involved in political and economic issues.

In 2002, he started working at the Foreign Policy Directorate of the Administration of the President of Ukraine Leonid Kuchma.

In December 2004, Prystaiko was appointed as a political counselor to the Embassy of Ukraine in Canada. Two years later, he became the acting chargé d'affaires (temporary counsel for Ukraine in Canada).

In 2007, he was a part of Ukraine's NATO negotiating team and served as the Deputy Director-General for NATO in the Ministry of Foreign Affairs.

In 2009, he became Deputy Chief of the Mission at the Embassy of Ukraine in Washington D.C.

On 8 November 2012, the President of Ukraine Viktor Yanukovich appointed Prystaiko as Ambassador of Ukraine to Canada. He became also a Ukrainian representative in the International Civil Aviation Organisation.

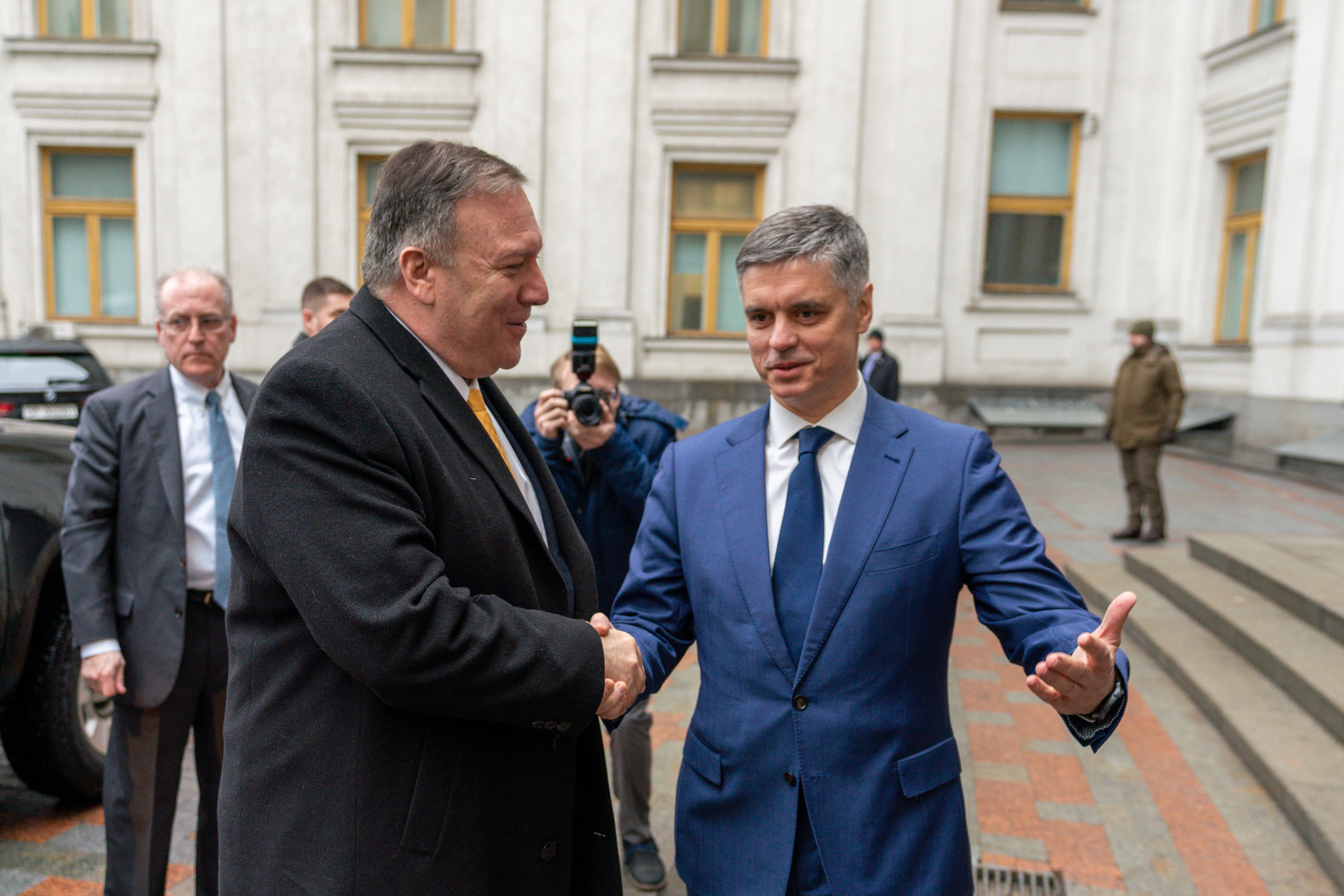
Prystaiko meets with U.S. Secretary of State Michael R. Pompeo in Kyiv, Ukraine on 31 January 2020.

In December 2014, he was named Deputy Foreign Minister and head of the apparatus under Foreign Minister Pavlo Klimkin.

He was Head of the Mission of Ukraine to NATO from 7 July 2017 until 29 August 2019.

On 22 May 2019, Prystaiko was appointed Deputy Head of the Presidential Administration by the decree of the President of Ukraine. He was a Member of the National Investment Council (21 June 2019).

On 29 August 2019, he became Minister of Foreign Affairs of Ukraine in the Government of Oleksiy Honcharuk. But on 4 March 2020, he was released from the post and appointed Vice Prime Minister for Euro-Atlantic Integration in the Government of Denys Shmyhal. On 4 June 2020, he was released from this post.

From 20 July 2020 to 21 July 2023, he was Ambassador of Ukraine to the UK.

On 30 December 2020, Prystaiko became a Representative of Ukraine in the International Maritime Organization (IMO).

In February 2022, during the prelude to the Russian invasion of Ukraine, Prystaiko said UK defence secretary's Ben Wallace's comparison of diplomatic efforts with Russia to the appeasement policies of the 1930s was unhelpful. Prystaiko warned, "There's panic everywhere, not just in people's minds, but in financial markets as well" and it was "hurting the Ukrainian economy on sort of the same level as people leaving the embassy".

On 21 July 2023, Prystaiko was sacked as Ukraine's ambassador to the United Kingdom by President Zelenskyy using a Presidential decree. No reason as to the sacking was given. He was also sacked from his role as the Ukrainian representative to the International Maritime Organization.

== Personal life ==
Prystayko's father Volodymyr Pristayko (1941–2008) was Lieutenant General of Justice and Vice director of the SBU, and in 1991 he started working in a commission of adaptation of laws to EU standards and on rehabilitation of politically repressed. He was an Honored Lawyer of Ukraine.

He is married to Inna Prystaiko. They have two sons.

== See also ==
- Honcharuk Government
- Shmyhal Government
- List of foreign ministers in 2019
- List of foreign ministers in 2020
- Embassy of Ukraine, Ottawa
- Embassy of Ukraine, London

Political offices
Preceded by Pavlo Klimkin	Minister of Foreign Affairs; 2019–2020	Succeeded by Dmytro Kuleba
