= Andriy Shevchenko (politician) =

Ukrainian politician, diplomat, journalist, and activist

- Андрій Шевченко
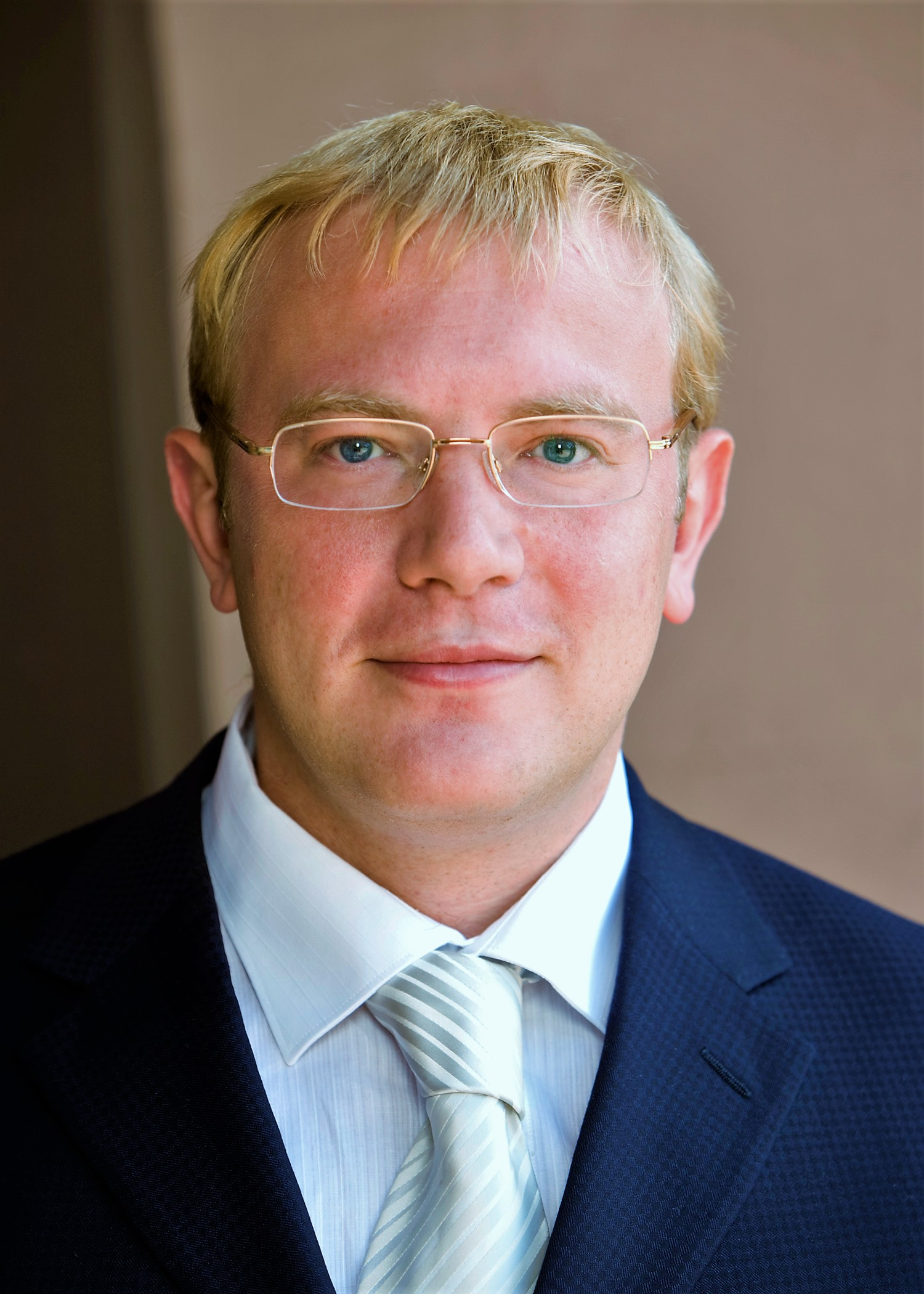

Ukraine Ambassador to Canada
- In office 24 September 2015 – 25 August 2021
- President: Petro Poroshenko; Volodymyr Zelenskyy
- Preceded by: Vadym Prystaiko
- Succeeded by: Yuliya Kovaliv

People's Deputy of Ukraine
- In office 25 May 2006 – 27 November 2014

Personal details
- Born: 10 June 1976 (age 50) Hvizdets, Ukrainian SSR, Soviet Union (now Hvizdets, Ukraine)
- Party: Yulia Tymoshenko Bloc
- Spouse: Hanna Homonai
- Children: 1
- Education: Kyiv National Taras Shevchenko University; NaUKMA
- Occupation: Politician
- Profession: Journalist

Andriy Vitaliyovych Shevchenko (Ukrainian: Андрій Віталійович Шевченко; born 10 June 1976) was the Ambassador of Ukraine to Canada from September 2015 until August 2021. He is also a prominent Ukrainian journalist and civil activist and a former member of the Verkhovna Rada, the Ukrainian parliament.

== Early life and education ==
Shevchenko was born in the town of Hvizdets, near Kolomyia, in Ukraine (at that time - the Ukrainian SSR of the Soviet Union), and spent his youth in Fastiv, near Kyiv. In 1999, he received his master's degree from the Institute of Journalism at Kyiv University; he also studied political science and economics at Kyiv-Mohyla Academy.

== Journalism ==
Shevchenko has worked as a multi-media journalist since 1994 for the 1+1 TV Channel, Novyi Kanal, Radio Voice of America and others.

Under the administration of President Kuchma, Shevchenko was one of the leaders of the journalists' movement against censorship. In 2002 he left Novyi Kanal under political pressure. Later in 2002 he established Kyiv Independent Media Union and was elected its first chairman.

In 2003, Shevchenko introduced his idea of creating the Channel of Honest News (Канал чесних новин). The 5th Channel, a 24-hours-day news channel, was the only network not controlled by the government. It eventually played a key role during the Orange Revolution of 2004. Shevchenko was the editor-in-chief of the channel and a news presenter.

In 2005, after the Orange Revolution, Shevchenko was appointed vice-president of the National Television Company of Ukraine, but left his position in six months after the government refused to transform the state broadcaster into a public broadcasting system. He is now president of the Center for Public Media, an NGO promoting public broadcasting in Ukraine.

In 2005 Shevchenko received The Press Freedom Award from Reporters Without Borders (Austria, 2005). He also received a number of Ukrainian journalistic awards, including The Best News Presenter, The Best News Program, The Best Documentary ('Teletriumph', 2005).

== Politics ==
Shevchenko successfully ran for the Ukrainian Parliament in 2006, 2007, and 2012 with Yulia Tymoshenko's party 'Batkivshchyna'. In the elections of 2006 and 2007 he was ranked 5th in the party lists of Yulia Tymoshenko's Block, and in 2012 he was ranked 33rd in the party list of the United Opposition.

In 2006 Shevchenko was elected the Ukrainian parliament's Free Speech Committee Chairman and became the youngest ever Committee chairman to serve in the Ukrainian Parliament. He was reelected the Free Speech Committee Chairman in 2010. After the election of 2012 Mr. Shevchenko was elected First Deputy Chairman of the Human Rights Committee.

Shevchenko is the author of the Ukrainian Law on Access to Public Information, which was adopted in 2011 and is credited with strengthening civil freedoms and the free flow of information in the country. He is also one of the authors of the Law on Non-Governmental Organizations.

Mr. Shevchenko was an active participant of Euromaydan – mass protests of 2013–14 that brought down the regime of Victor Yanukovich.

In the 2014 Ukrainian parliamentary election he was not re-elected into parliament; because he placed 20th on the electoral list of Batkivshchina and the party won 17 seats on the electoral list and 2 constituency seats.

== Diplomatic career ==
In September 2015, Shevchenko was appointed Ukrainian ambassador to Canada.

From 2017 to 2021 he served as Ukraine's Representative to International Civil Organization (ICAO).

Shevchenko's posting coincided with the "golden" period in Ukraine-Canada relations:

- the Free Trade Agreement between Ukraine and Canada (CUFTA) was signed;
- the Canada-Ukraine Defence Cooperation Arrangement was signed;
- Canada included Ukraine in the AFCCL (Automatic Firearms Country Control List), which allowed supplies of weapons to Ukraine;
- first Canadian weapons contracts to Ukraine (PGW C14 Timberwolf sniper rifles);- Canadian Operation Unifier military training mission extended until 2019, and later 2022;
- Canadian prime minister Trudeau visited Ukraine, and Ukrainian presidents Poroshenko and Zelenskyy visited Canada;
- Audiovisual Coproduction Treaty between Ukraine and Canada was signed;
- Canada hosted Ukraine Reform Conference.

Shevchenko served the longest ambassadorship in the history of diplomatic relations between Ukraine and Canada. He finished his term as the European dean of the diplomatic corps in Canada.

== Russian-Ukrainian War ==
After the full-scale Russian aggression, Shevchenko became a co-founder of Media Center Ukraine - a public initiative that brought together communication professionals to assist foreign journalists in covering the war.

The media center started its work in Lviv, later MCU hubs were opened in Kyiv, Kharkiv, and Odesa. The Media Center focuses on working with foreign journalists, facilitating effective communication between government, business, and the public sector, as well as creating an expert environment to develop effective communication strategies to help Ukraine win the war and recover afterward. According to MCU, about 4,000 media representatives passed through its accreditation.

In July 2022, Shevchenko's brother Yevhen Olefirenko ("Elvis"), a platoon commander of the Foreign Legion (I Separate Special Forces Brigade named after Ivan Bohun), died in a battle against the Russian troops near Bakhmut.
