= Chas. Pidsumky Dnya =

Ukrainian talk show

Chas. Pidsumky Dnya (Ukrainian: Час. Підсумки Дня) is a cultural-political talk show on 5 Kanal. Roman Chajka, Svjatoslav Tsegolko and Sergiy Dorofejev present debate on actual events of day from world of art, culture, politics and social life.
