= Maryna Hrymych =

Ukrainian novelist and academician (born 1961)

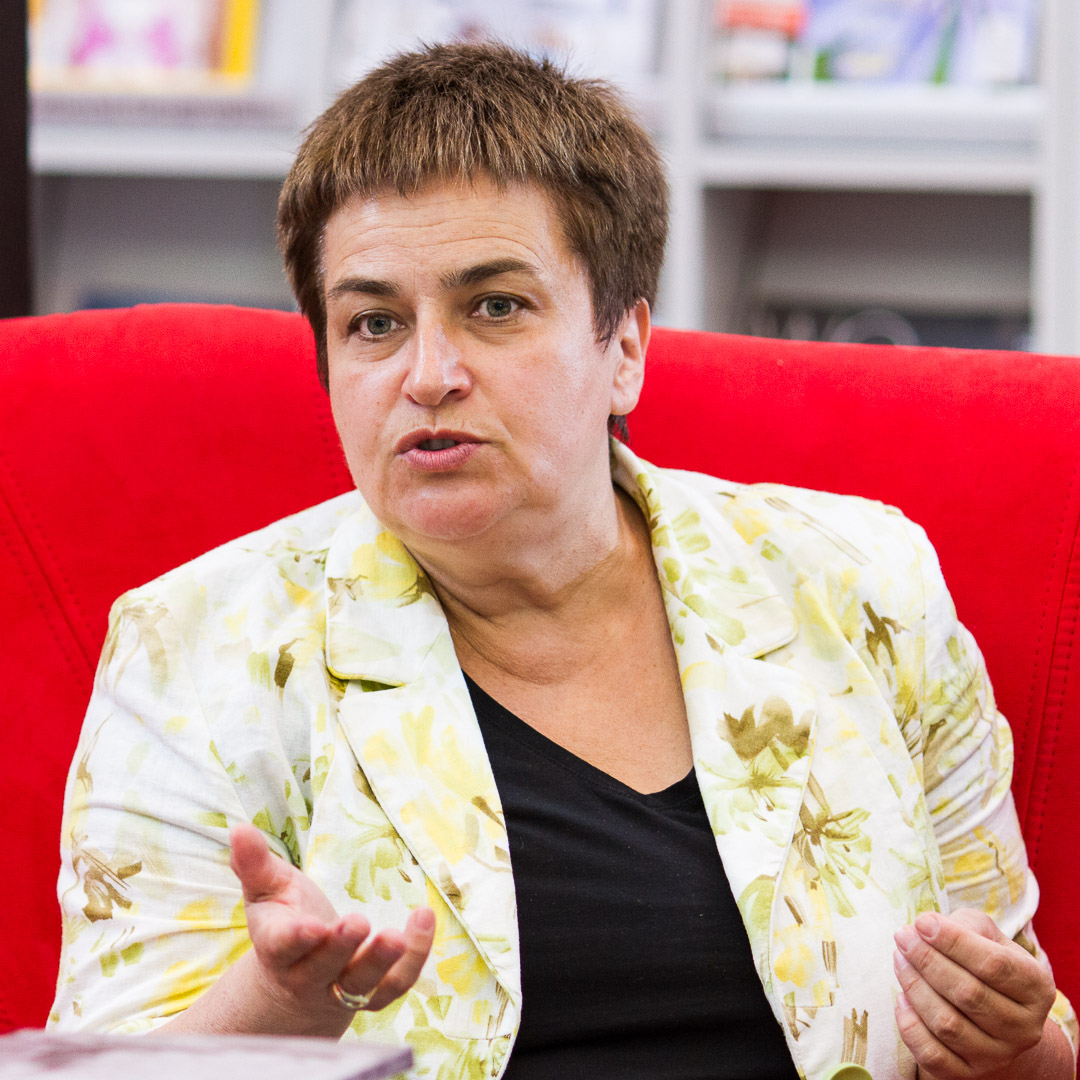
Maryna Hrymych, 2015

Maryna Villivna Hrymych (Ukrainian: Мари́на Ві́ллівна Гри́мич; born April 4,1961) is a Ukrainian novelist and academician. She is Editor-in-Chief of the Publishing House Duliby, a Producer of the literary project Lyuba Klymenko and a member of the Writers Union of Ukraine and the Canadian Union of Ethnology. She holds a Ph.D. in Philology and History.

Her husband Ihor Ostash was a Member of the Ukrainian Parliament (1996–2006) and is an Ambassador Extraordinary and Plenipotentiary of Ukraine to Canada (since 2006).

== Education ==
Maryna Hrymych was born on April 4, 1961, in Kyiv. Hrymych studied Philology at Taras Shevchenko National University of Kyiv graduating in 1983. She earned a Ph.D. in philology from the Institute of Art History, Folkloristics and Ethnography of the Academy of Sciences of the Ukrainian Soviet Social Republic.

From 991-1995, she worked as an Academic Secretary and Deputy Head of the International School of Ukrainian Studies at the National Academy of Sciences of Ukraine. Between 1996 and 2006, she was Associate Professor and later Professor at the Taras Shevchenko National University of Kyiv, Department of History. From 2001-2006, Hrymych chaired Ethnology and Regional Studies of the department. In 2004, she obtained her Ph.D. in history.

She is married to Ihor Ostash.

== Career ==
Hrymych began her academic career as an ethnographer and folklorist at the M. T. Rylskyi Institute of Art History, Folkloristics and Ethnography of the Academy of Sciences of the USSR. At the Department of History of the Taras Shevchenko National University of Kyiv, she taught ethnology and social anthropology. Her cross-disciplinary Ph.D. thesis focused on customary law as it relates to three scientific fields – ethnology, history and law.

Hrymych conducted ethnological and anthropological field work throughout Ukraine and in a number of other countries. She authored two monographs, and two manuals.

She was awarded the Taras Shevchenko Award (Taras Shevchenko National University of Kyiv) for her monograph Property Institution in the Customary Law Culture of the Ukrainians in the 19th and beginning of the 20th centuries (2004).

She is a member of the Canadian Union of Ethnology (since 2007).

As a student, Hrymych published her first translations from the Slovenian, Serbian-Croat and Macedonian languages. At this time, her first poems in the Dnipro and Zhovten literary magazines appeared as well. Since 2000, she has worked as a novelist and essay writer. Maryna Hrymych is the author of eight novels, two book translations, and essays.

She is a prize-winner of the All-Ukrainian Literary Competition Koronatsiya Slova (special awards in 2000, 2001, first prize in 2002 for novel Egoist).

Since 2004, she is a member of the Writers Union of Ukraine.

In 2004, she founded and took the lead of the publishing house Duliby specializing in modern Ukrainian literature and scientific works of ethnological character.

== Publications ==
=== Novels ===
- Do You Hear, Margo? (Ти чуєш, Марго?, 2000) - Prize of the All-Ukrainian Literary Competition Koronatsiya Slova
- Bartholomew's Night (Варфоломієва ніч, 2002) - Prize of the All-Ukrainian Literary Competition Koronatsiya Slova
- Magdalynky (Магдалинки, 2003)
- Egoist (Еґоїст, 2003) – First Prize of the All-Ukrainian Literary Competition Koronatsiya Slova
- Red Poppy in the Dew (Мак червоний в росі, 2005)
- Frida (Фріда, 2006)
- White Owl Island (Острів білої сови, 2010)
- Second Life (Second Life (Друге життя), 2010)
- Letyuchiy Smittyevoz (Летючий Сміттевоз, 2016)

=== Scientific works ===
- Traditional Worldview and Ethno-Psychological Constants of the Ukrainians (Cognitive Anthropology) (Традиційний світогляд та етнопсихологічні константи українців (Когнітивна антропологія), 2000)
- Property Institution in the Customary Law Culture of the Ukrainians in the 19th – beginning of the 20th centuries (Інститут власності у звичаєво-правовій культурі українців ХІХ - початку ХХ ст., 2004) – Taras Shevchenko Award, 2005 (Taras Shevchenko National University of Kyiv), 5th place in the category ‘Foretime’ of the All-Ukrainian Ranking Book of the Year, 2004
- Customary Law of the Ukrainians in the 19th – beginning of the 20th centuries: Second, Revised Edition (Звичаєве право українців ХІХ — початку ХХ ст.: 2 видання, доповнене, 2006)
