= Velyki Ukraïntsi =

Ukrainian television series

Logo of the project

The Greatest Ukrainians (Ukrainian: Великі українці, romanized: Velyki ukrainstsi) was a Ukrainian TV project. The programme was the result of a vote conducted to determine whom the Ukrainian public considers the greatest Ukrainians to have ever lived. According to Savik Shuster, more than 2.5 million people participated in the voting.

The show ran under a license from the BBC and originally appeared on British TV under the name 100 Greatest Britons and was successful. Many countries created their own versions.

== Results ==
The TV show was broadcast on Inter with episodes lasting 90 to 180 minutes during Sunday prime-time. The host of the program, Savik Shuster, started primaries (pre-voting) during his other Friday talk show The Freedom with Savik Shuster. The co-host of the programme was Inter's news anchor Hanna Homonai. Pre-voting took place in a number of Ukrainian cities such as Kyiv, Lviv, Yalta, Kharkiv, Odesa, Donetsk, Simferopol, Nizhyn, Mykolaiv, Ostroh, Chernivtsi, and Kamianets-Podilskyi.

== Top Ten ==
On 11 April 2008, the top 100 Greatest Ukrainians were announced. The top 10 was to be voted on again, and the results were shown on 16 May 2008. The final top 10 were:

1. Yaroslav I the Wise (978–1054) (40%)
2. Mykola Amosov (1913–2002) (19.88%)
3. Stepan Bandera (1909–1959) (16%)
4. Taras Shevchenko (1814–1861) (9.3%)
5. Bohdan Khmelnytskyi (1595–1657) (4.02%)
6. Valeriy Lobanovskyi (1939–2002) (3.18%)
7. Viacheslav Chornovil (1937–1999) (2.63%)
8. Hryhoriy Skovoroda (1722–1794) (1.73%)
9. Lesia Ukrainka (1871–1913) (1.64%)
10. Ivan Franko (1856–1916) (1.49%)

== 11 – 100 ==
11. Ivan Mazepa (1639–1709) Hetman of Zaporizhian Host in 1687–1708
12. Roman Shukhevych (1907–1950) politician and military leader
13. Vasyl Stus (1938–1985) poet and journalist
14. Mykhailo Hrushevskyi (1866–1934) academician and historian
15. Vitali Klitschko (1971–) politician and former professional boxer and Wladimir Klitschko (1976–) professional boxer from 1996 to til' 2017
16. Volodymyr I of Kyiv (958–1015) prince and grand prince
17. Serhiy Korolyov (1907–1966) rocket engineer for Soviet Union
18. Mykola Hohol (1809–1852) dramatist
19. Andrey Sheptytskyi (1865–1944) Metropolitan Archbishop of the Ukrainian Greek Catholic Church
20. Viktor Yushchenko (1954–) President of Ukraine 2005–2010
21. Yuliya Tymoshenko (1960–) politician and the first woman appointed Prime Minister
22. Oleksandr Dovzhenko (1894–1956) film producer
23. Volodymyr Lenin (1870–1924) communist revolutionary and political theorist
24. Volodymyr Dal (1801–1872) lexicographer
25. Lina Kostenko (1930–) poet and writer
26. Symon Petliura (1879–1926) leader of the Ukrainian National Republic
27. Leonid Bykov (1928–1979) actor and film producer
28. Petro Konashevych-Sahaidachnyi (1582–1622) military leader
29. Ivan Kotliarevskyi (1769–1838) writer, pioneer of modern Ukrainian literature
30. Volodymyr Ivasiuk (1949–1979) songwriter

31. Solomiya Krushelnytska (1872–1952) soprano
32. Nestor Makhno (1888–1934) anarchist revolutionary
33. Andriy Shevchenko (1976–) politician, former striker for Milan, Chelsea and football manager
34. Danylo of Halychyna (1201–1264) king of Ruthenia
35. Serhiy Bubka (1963–) former pole vaulter
36. Pylyp Orlyk (1672–1742) a Zaporozhian Cossack statesman, diplomat and starshyna
37. Ivan Kozhedub (1920–1991) military aviator
38. Levko Lukianenko (1927–2018) politician
39. Volodymyr Vernadskyi (1863–1945) founder of geochemistry, biogeochemistry, and radiogeology
40. Yevhen Konovalets (1891–1938) military commander of the UNR army
41. Mykola Lysenko (1842–1912) composer and pianist
42. Sydir Kovpak (1887–1967) partisan leader in Ukraine
43. Olha of Kyiv (890–969) saint
44. Volodymyr Shcherbytskyi (1918–1990) politician
45. Oleh Antonov (1906–1984) aircraft designer
46. Yevheniy Paton (1870–1953) engineer and Borys Paton (1918–2020) chairman of National Academy of Sciences
47. Bohdan Stupka (1941–2012) actor
48. Yosyf Slipyi (1893–1984) Archbishop of the Ukrainian Greek Catholic Church
49. Mykhailo Bulhakov (1891–1940) writer
50. Volodymyr Boyko
51. Leonid Kravchuk (1934–2022) First President of Ukraine
52. Petro Mohyla (1596–1647) Metropolitan of Kyiv

53. Ivan Sirko (1605–1680) Ukrainian Cossack military leader
54. Sofiya Rotaru (1947–) pop singer
55. Anatoliy Solovianenko (1932–1999) opera singer
56. Oleh Blokhin (1952–) football manager
57. Liliya Podkopaieva (1978–) former artistic gymnast
58. Volodymyr II Monomakh (1053–1125) Grand Prince of Kievan Rus
59. Mykola Hrynko (1920–1989) actor
60. Nina Matviyenko (1947–2023) singer
61. Ihor Sikorskyi (1889–1972) American aviation pioneer
62. Viktor Yanukovych (1950–) politician and fourth President of Ukraine
63. Leonid Brezhnev (1906–1982) General Secretary of the Central Committee
64. Sviatoslav Vakarchuk (1975–) lead vocalist of Okean Elzy
65. Illia Repin (1844–1930) realist painter
66. Mariya Zankovetska (1854–1934) theater actress
67. Ivan Mykolaichuk (1941–1987) Soviet actor
68. Vasyl Virastiuk (1974–) Former strongman competitor
69. Ivan Pulyui (1845–1918) physicist and inventor
70. Mykola Pyrohov (1810–1881) medical doctor
71. Oles Honchar (1918–1995) writer
72. Vasyl Symonenko (1935–1963) poet and journalist
73. Mykhailo Kotsiubynskyi (1864–1913) author
74. Raisa Kyrychenko
75. Nazariy Yaremchuk (1951–1995) singer
76. Ruslana (1973–) pop singer
77. Yana Klochkova (1982–) swimmer

78. Les Kurbas (1887–1937) Most important theatre director of 20th century in Ukraine
79. Petro Symonenko (1952–) politician
80. Kostiantyn Vasyl Ostrozkyi (1526–1608) prince
81. Roksolana (1504–1558) Wife of Sultan Süleyman the Magnificent
82. Pavlo Skoropadskyi (1873–1945) state leader
83. Oleksiy Stakhanov (1906–1977) miner, known for Stakhanovite movement
84. Kateryna Vasylivna Bilokur (1900–1961) folk artist
85. Ivan Bohun Cossack colonel
86. Vasyl Sukhomlynskyi (1918–1970) teacher
87. Anton Makarenko (1888–1939) social worker and educator
88. Petro Kalnyshevskyi (1690–1803) Koshovyi Otaman of the Zaporozhian Host
89. Mykola Vatutin (1901–1944) military commander
90. Oleh Skrypka (1964–) musician
91. Ivan Piddubnyi (1871–1949) professional wrestler
92. Illia Mechnikov (1845–1916) zoologist
93. Mykyta Khrushchov (1894–1971) statesman
94. Olena Teliha (1906–1942) poet and activist
95. Oleg Koshevoy (1926–1943) Soviet partisan
96. Ostap Vyshnia (1889–1956) writer, humourist
97. Dmytro Vyshnevetskyi (1516–1563) Hetman of the Ukrainian Cossacks
98. Valentyn Yenevskyi
99. Victor Glushkov (1926–1982) Founder of cybernetics
100. Tomb of the Unknown Soldier

== Great Ukrainians series ==
An hour-long documentary was filmed on each of the top 10 nominees, each of them hosted by a celebrity advocate, who delivered a passionate argument as to why their choice should be voted the greatest Ukrainian of all. The series concluded with a debate on the merits of each selected Ukrainian, bringing all of the advocates together to make a final plea to voters.

No.	Great Ukrainian	Celebrity Supporter
1	Mykola Amosov (1913–2002)	Vitaliy Korotych (1936–)
2	Stepan Bandera (1909–1959)	Vakhtang Kipiani (1971–)
3	Valeriy Lobanovskyi (1939–2002)	Leonid Kravchuk (1934–2022)
4	Hryhoriy Skovoroda (1722–1794)	Ostap Stupka (1967-)
5	Lesia Ukrainka (1871–1913)	Roman Viktiuk (1936–2020)
6	Ivan Franko (1856–1916)	Sviatoslav Vakarchuk (1975–)
7	Bohdan Khmelnytskyi (1595–1657)	Dmytro Korchynskyi (1964–)
8	Viacheslav Chornovil (1937–1999)	Taras Chornovil (1964–)
9	Taras Shevchenko (1814–1861)	Bohdan Stupka (1941–2012)
10	Yaroslav I the Wise (978–1054)	Dmytro Tabachnyk (1963–)

== Controversy ==
=== Manipulations ===
The Chief of Great Ukrainians project, journalist Vakhtang Kipiani, informed the public in his blog, that the voting system had been manipulated by unknown persons. He stated that a couple of days prior to publishing the results he was aware of a possible win for Yaroslav the Wise. Prior to that, with a huge lead in first place was the controversial Stepan Bandera. For example, the winner, Yaroslav I, received 60,000 votes in one month and almost 550,000 in just one day. Mykola Amosov, who took second place, received almost 150,000 votes in just one day. Kipiani said that if these manipulation hadn't taken place Yaroslav would not have won.

Among other Great Ukrainians for whatever reasons appeared Vladimir Lenin as well as such names like Stakhanov, Glushkov, and Vatutin.

== Other editions ==
Other countries have produced similar shows; see Greatest Britons spin-offs
