= Vakhtang Kipiani =

Ukrainian journalist

- ვახტანგ ყიფიანი (Georgian); Вахтанг Кіпіані (Ukrainian)
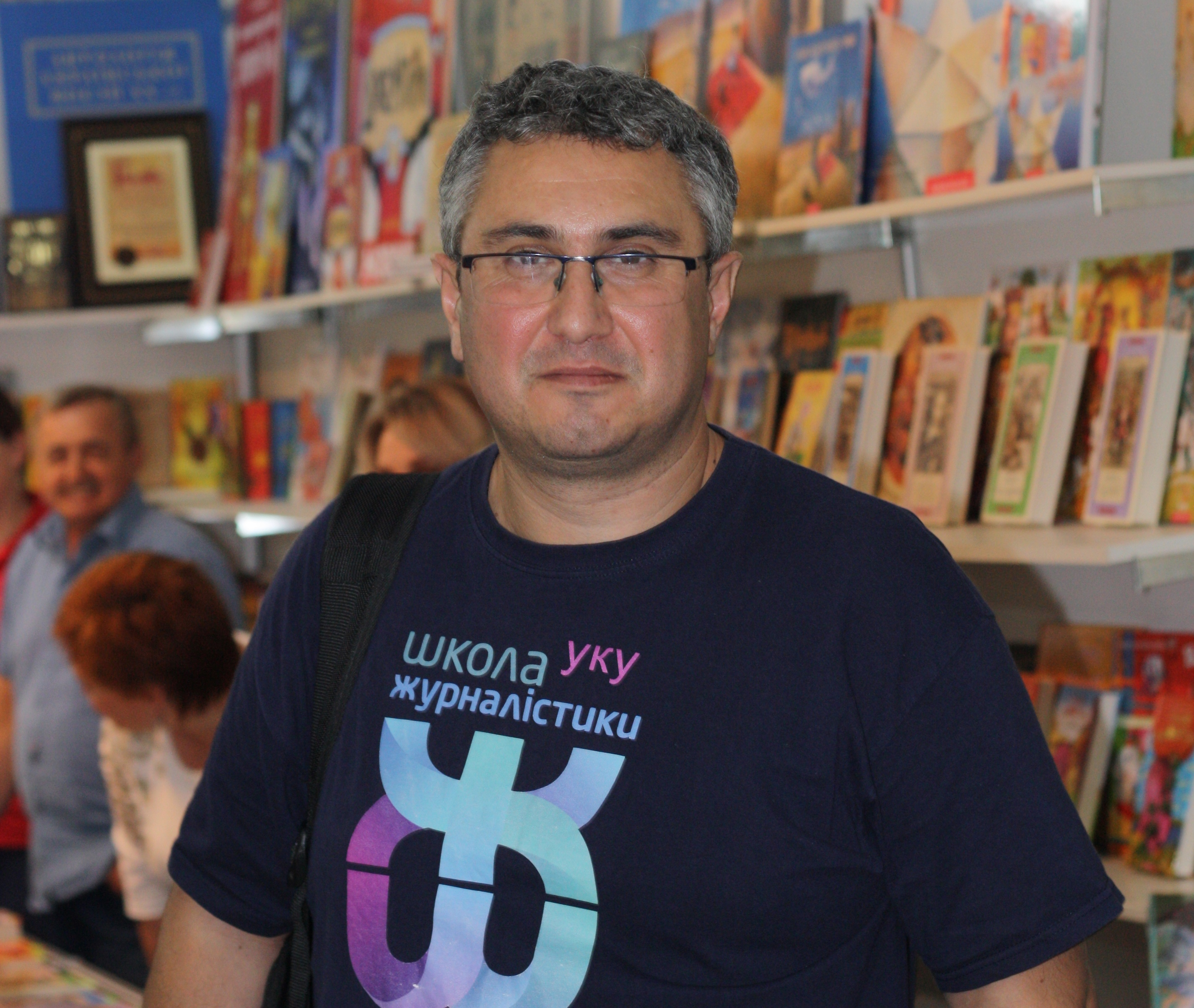
- Kipiani 2017
- Born: April 1, 1971 (age 55); Tbilisi, Georgian SSR, Soviet Union
- Occupations: Journalist; historian; opinion journalist
- Years active: 1990–present

Vakhtang Kipiani (Georgian: ვახტანგ ყიფიანი, Ukrainian: Вахтанг Кіпіані; born April 1, 1971) is a Ukrainian journalist, historian, and opinion journalist the most famous for his book "The Case of Vasyl Stus" that won the first place in the "List of 30 iconic books of Ukrainian Independence" compiled by Ukrainian Book Institute and Ministry of Culture and Information Policy of Ukraine with help of voting of qualified voters in 2021. He is the editor-in-chief of the newspaper Istorychna Pravda (from September 2010), the head of the Museum-Archive of the Press and lecturer in Ukrainian Catholic University and in National University of Kyiv-Mohyla Academy. He is a recipient of Shevchenko National Prize in journalism and a Honored Journalist of Ukraine (from 2005).

== Biography ==
Vakhtang Kipiani was born in 1971 in Tbilisi, Georgia (then part of Soviet Union). He graduated from the V.О. Sukhomlynskyi National University of Mykolaiv. He was a participant of the Revolution on Granite in Ukraine in 1990. From 1990 when he started to write for the newspaper of People's Movement of Ukraine he worked as journalist in Ukrayina Moloda, Novyi Kanal, Kievskiye Vedomosti, 1+1 (TV channel), Focus as editor-in-chief, Inter (TV channel) as editor-in-chief of Velyki Ukraïntsi, TVi (TV channel), UA:First as moderator of the election debates of 2010 Ukrainian presidential election and from 2013 and up to now is a host of a TV program "Historical Truth with Vakhtang Kipiani" that from 2019 is being broadcast on Espreso TV. Since 2010, Vakhtang Kipiani has lectured at the Ukrainian Catholic University in Lviv and then also at the National University of Kyiv-Mohyla Academy.

Kipiani studies the history of the informal press in the former Soviet Union, gathering examples of local newspapers in Museum-Archive of the Press. He is also researching manifestations of extremism in media.

== The case of Vasyl Stus ==
In 2019, Vakhtang Kipiani's book "The case of Vasyl Stus" was published. The book evolves around the criminal prosecution of a Ukrainian poet, translator, literary critic, journalist, and an active member of the Ukrainian dissident movement Vasyl Stus. It mentions one of the most prominent Ukrainian pro-Russian politicians – Viktor Medvedchuk. In 1980, during the final court hearings in the case against Stus, Medvedchuk served as Stus’ attorney. However, he did nothing to defend Stus and even admitted his alleged guilt. Medvedchuk also served as an attorney in cases against other Ukrainian dissidents, doing as little as in the Stus case. Medvedchuk filed a lawsuit against Vakhtang Kipiani and a Darnytskyi District Court of Kyiv banned publishing of the book. It caused huge demand for the book, it reached more than 100 thousand copies that was a record number for non-fiction book written in Ukrainian. Then on October 19, 2020, the Kyiv Court of Appeals overturned the decision of the Darnytsia District Court of Kyiv to ban the distribution of the book.

In October 2021 "The Case of Vasyl Stus" won the first place the all-Ukrainian informational and educational action "30 iconic books of our Independence" dedicated to the 30th anniversary of Ukrainian independence that gathered 267,815 votes cast by 34,797 Ukrainians.

On 24 March 2022 the Chief Directorate of Intelligence of the Ministry of Defence of Ukraine reported that "The Case of Vasyl Stus" was removed from libraries in three Ukrainian Russian-occupied towns during the 2022 Russian invasion of Ukraine.

== Controversy ==
On February 26, 2025, Vakhtang Kipiani published a post on Facebook containing a death threat against Sławomir Mentzen, a candidate for the presidency of Poland, who had visited Lviv. In the post, Kipiani suggested that Mentzen could share the fate of Bronisław Pieracki, a Polish politician assassinated in 1934 by Ukrainian nationalists.

== Awards and honours ==
- 2005 – Honored Journalist of Ukraine.
