= Hanna Homonai =

Ukrainian TV news anchor (born 1979)

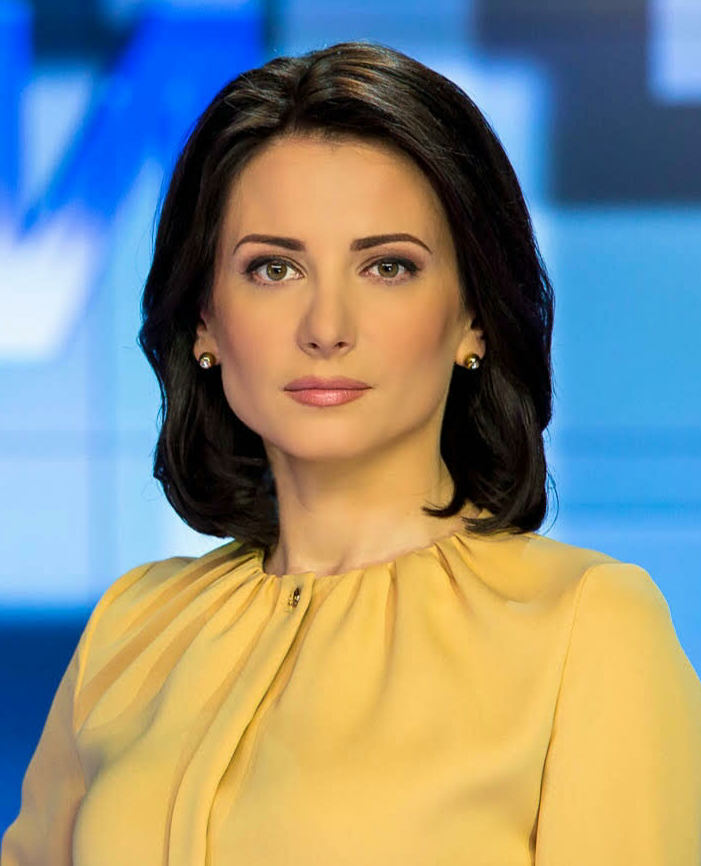
- Born: Hanna Stanislavivna Homonai; 29 May 1979 (age 47); Kyiv, Ukrainian SSR, Soviet Union
- Education: Kyiv Taras Shevchenko University
- Occupations: Journalist, TV presenter
- Years active: 1999–present
- Spouse: Andriy Shevchenko
- Children: 2

Hanna Stanislavivna Homonai (Ukrainian: Ганна Станіславівна Гомонай, born 29 May 1979) is a Ukrainian TV news anchor. She was born in Kyiv, in the Ukrainian SSR of the Soviet Union (in present-day Ukraine).

== Career in journalism ==
- 1999–2004 — Noviy Kanal, correspondent
- 2004 — 5th Channel, news anchor
- 2005–2007 — K1, news anchor
- Since 2007 — Inter, news anchor
- 2007–08 — co-host of 'The Great Ukrainians' TV show

After the return of her husband Andriy Shevchenko from his diplomatic mission in Canada, Hanna resumed her career as a TV presenter on the Rada TV channel.

== Education ==
In 2003, she received her master's degree from the Institute of Journalism at Kyiv Taras Shevchenko University.

In 1996–97, she studied at Augustine Cournot Lyceum (Gray, France).

In 1996, she graduated from Kyiv Secondary School #251.

== Personal life ==
Homonai is married to Andriy Shevchenko, a journalist, politician, and diplomat, with whom she has a daughter Marichka.
