= Tetiana Danylenko =

Ukrainian journalist (born 1983)

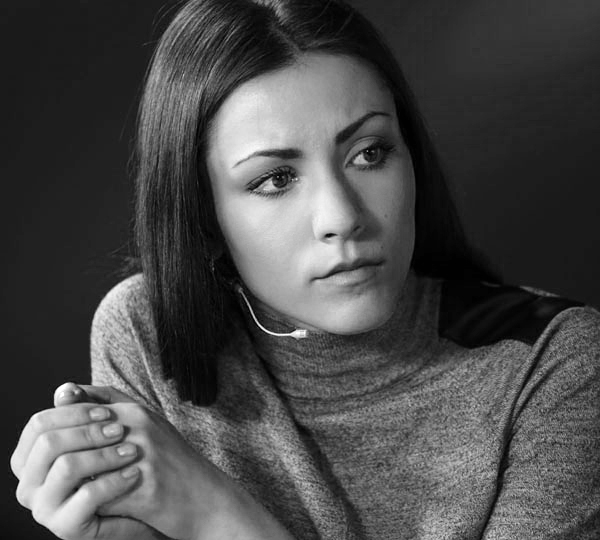
- Born: Tetyana Volodymyrivna Danylenko; October 30, 1983 (age 42); Zhytomyr, Ukrainian SSR, Soviet Union
- Other names: Tetyana Danilenko, Tetiana Danylenko, Tetiana Danilenko
- Occupations: journalist, correspondent

Tetiana Volodymyrivna Danylenko (Ukrainian: Тетя́на Володи́мирівна Даниле́нко, born 30 October 1983 in Zhytomyr), is a Ukrainian TV journalist and television host for the Channel 5 and the Hromadske.tv, a blog editor at the Ukrayinska Pravda.

== Biography ==
Danylenko was born in a family of Ukrainian writer and a teacher of Ukrainian language, Volodymyr Danylenko. Sometimes between 1998-2001 along with her family, she moved to Kyiv where Danylenko enrolled in the Journalism Institute of Kyiv University. In 2002 during her second year of studying, Danylenko was accepted as a correspondent to the STB, where she worked until 2004.

In 2007-08 carried relations with Vladyslav Kaskiv.

In 2010 Danylenko was involuntarily involved in xenophobic case of Ukraine's militsiya (along with Berkut) towards another Ukrainian journalist Mustafa Nayyem when her car was stopped by officials.

From August 23 to 25, 2011, together with Pavlo Kuzheev, she held Ukrainian Independence Telemarathon on Channel 5, dedicated to the 20th anniversary of Ukraine's independence, which lasted exactly 52 hours. Due to this, she got into the Guinness Book of Records and the records of Ukraine as the host of the longest TV show in history.

She hosted evening programs on "Radio NV", previously hosted programs « FACE 2 FACE » on ZIK TV channels, even earlier Results of the week "on" [Channel 5] and".

In August 2014 Danylenko became surprised by the level of Russian propaganda when she spoke with several people of Belarusian background who appeared very pro-Soviet (see Neo-Sovietism) and describing them as "sovok".

In Fall of 2017 Minister of Internal Affairs of Ukraine Arsen Avakov was suing Tetyana Danylenko for comments made during her interview with Mikheil Saakashvili.

In Summer of 2018 her name (Danilenko or Danylenko) surfaced in report of General Prosecutor of Ukraine (GPU) in connection with failed assassination attempt of Arkady Babchenko and supposedly Danylenko was on the "hit list" as well.

On 4 September 2018 she signed a protest letter after General Prosecutor of Ukraine allowed to access information from a private phone of another Ukrainian journalist of Radio Liberty Natalia Sedletska.
