= List of ambassadors of Ukraine to Canada =

Ambassador of Ukraine to Canada
- Посол України в Канаді

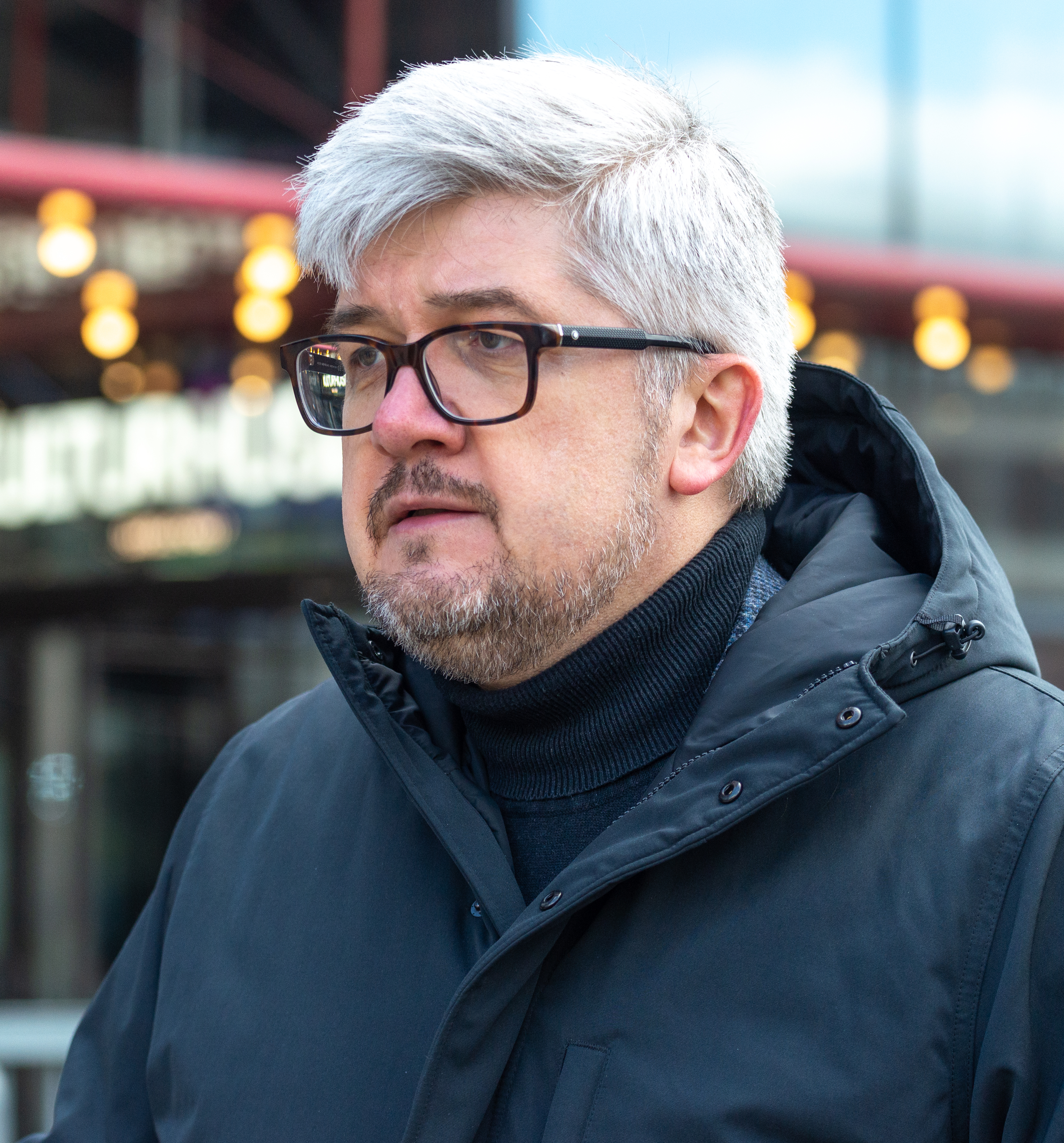
- Incumbent; Andrii Plakhotniuk since September 25, 2025
- Nominator: The president
- Inaugural holder: Levko Lukyanenko as Ambassador Extraordinary and Plenipotentiary
- Formation: March 14, 1992
- Website: Ukraine Embassy – Ottawa

The ambassador of Ukraine to Canada (Ukrainian: Посол України в Канаді) is the ambassador extraordinary and plenipotentiary from Ukraine to Canada.

== History ==
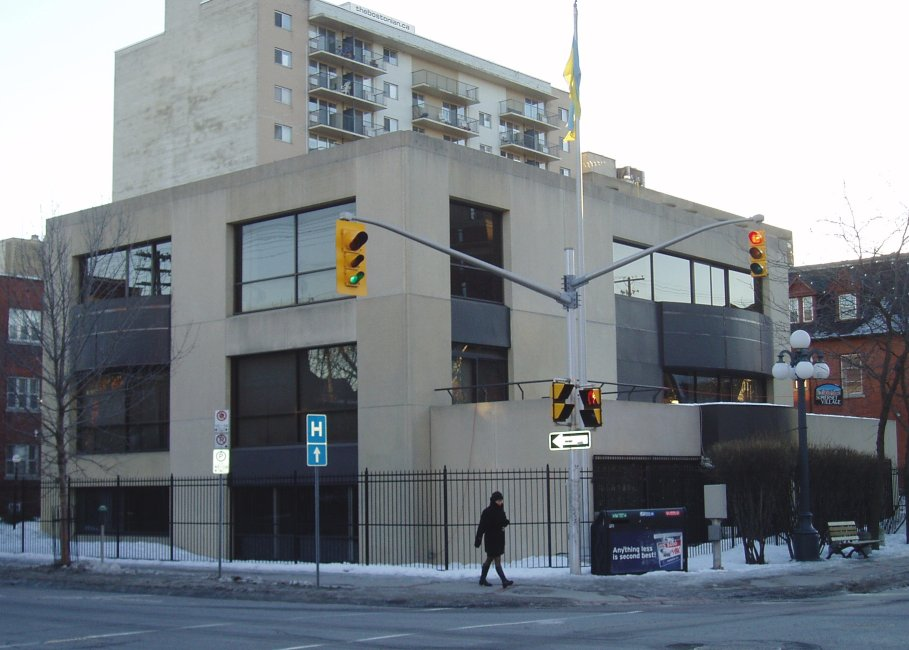
Embassy of Ukraine in Canada (Ottawa)

Canada became the first Western power to recognize the independence of Ukraine on 2 December 1991. Diplomatic relations were fully established on January 27, 1992, when the Minister of Foreign Affairs Anatoliy Zlenko and the Secretary of State for External Affairs Barbara McDougal exchanged notes.

On September 10, 1992, a Canadian of Ukrainian descent, Erast Hutsulyak, obtained a house at 331 Metcalfe Street in Ottawa for $615,000; he donated it to the Government of Ukraine as accommodation for the Embassy of Ukraine in Canada. The embassy was officially opened on December 1, 1992. In 1994, another house was purchased for the embassy, at 310 Somerset Street West, for $1.8 million. The new building is located 700 m (0.43 mi) from the first one. Most of the funds came from the Ukrainian Canadian Congress. The building at Metcalfe Street was left for the Consulate of Ukraine in Ottawa.

== Ambassadors to Canada ==
- 1991–1992 Aleksei Rodionov (Chargé d'Affaires of Ukraine in Canada)
- 1992-05-14 – 1993-10-15 Levko Lukyanenko
- 1994 – 1996-01-17 Victor Batiuk
- 1996-01-24 – 1998-10-15 Volodymyr Furkalo
- 1998-10-22 – 1999-12-11 Volodymyr Khandohiy
- 2000-03-09 – 2003-04-07 Yuriy Shcherbak
- 2004-03-20 – 2006-02-07 Mykola Maimeskul
- 2006-09-11 – 2011-06-16 Ihor Ostash
- 2011 - 2012 Marko Shevchenko (Chargé d'Affaires of Ukraine in Canada)
- 2012-11-08 – 2014-11 Vadym Prystaiko
- 2014-11-27 – 2015 Marko Shevchenko (Chargé d'Affaires of Ukraine in Canada)
- 2015-09-24 – 2021-08-25 Andriy Shevchenko
- 2022-03-09 – 2025 Yulia Kovaliv
- 2025-09-25 – present Andrii Plakhotniuk

== See also ==
- Canada–Ukraine relations
