= Embassy of Ukraine, Ottawa =

Diplomatic mission of Ukraine to Canada

Embassy of Ukraine in Ottawa
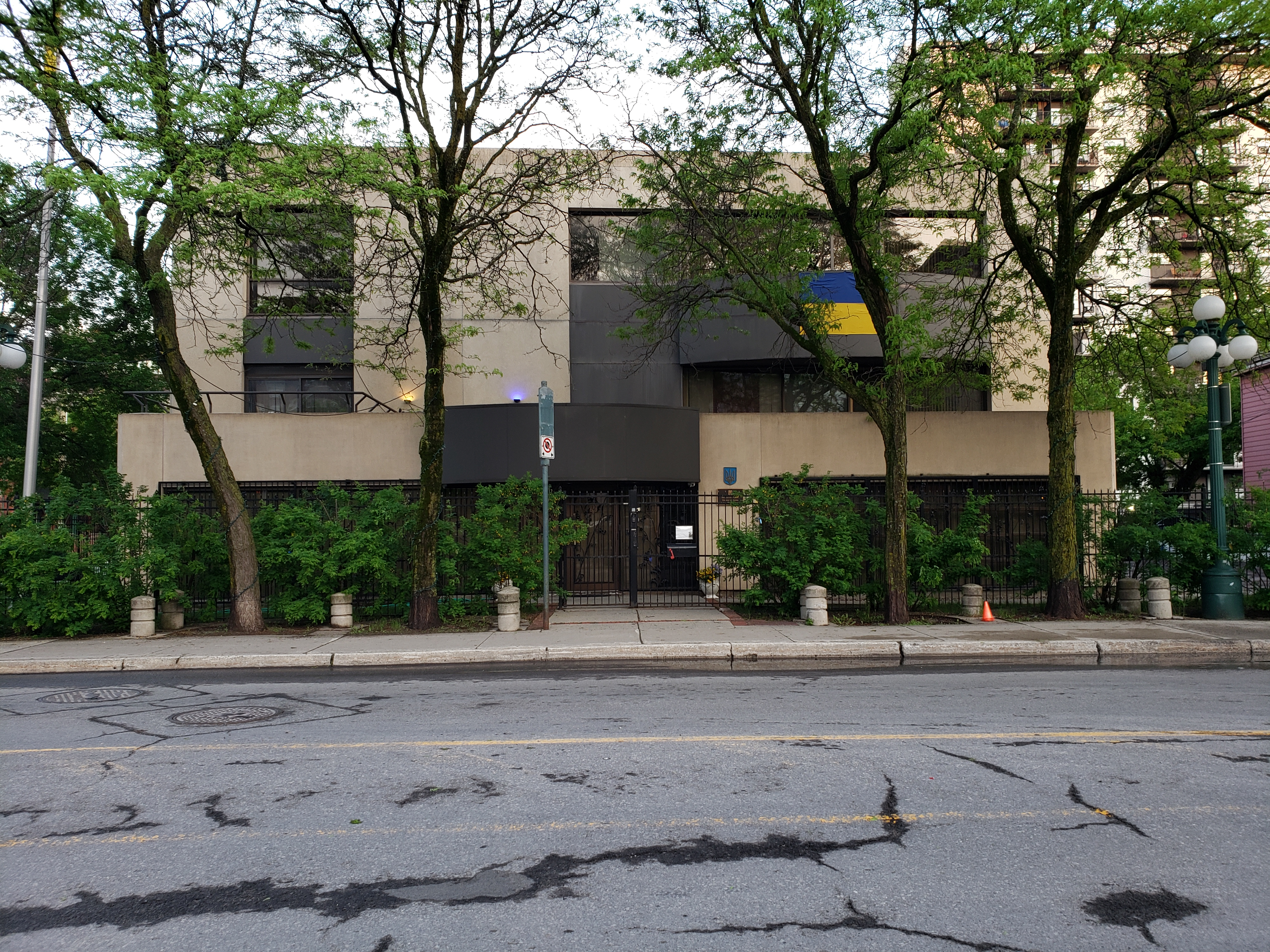
- 310 Somerset Street
- Location: Ottawa, Ontario, Canada
- Coordinates: 45.416750°N 75.692448°W
- Ambassador: Andrii Plakhotniuk

The Embassy of Ukraine, Ottawa is Ukraine's diplomatic mission in Ottawa, Ontario, Canada. Canada was the first western nation to recognize Ukraine's independence on December 2, 1991. The existence of a large Ukrainian-Canadian community has led to continued close relations between the two nations. The Ukrainian embassy was established on May 3, 1992. Originally in rented apartments, then it moved to a heritage building at 331 Metcalfe Street, that was purchased with the aid of donations from Ukrainian-Canadians.

The current home of the embassy chancery is 310 Somerset Street West. This building was originally a mortgage and investment office. In 1991, it was purchased by the New Democratic Party for two million dollars and became their party headquarters. After the NDP lost official party status in Parliament in the 1993 election and found itself deeply in debt, it decided to sell the property. The Ukrainians, whose delegation had grown considerably, bought it in September 1994. The original chancery on Metcalfe is still used by the embassy to house its consular section.

Since March 21, 1993, Ukraine has also maintained a Consulate General in Toronto and since September 7, 2018 a Consulate General in Edmonton.

On March 9, 2022, Yuliya Kovaliv was appointed Ukrainian ambassador to Canada.

== See also ==
- Diplomatic missions of Ukraine
- Ukraine Ambassador to Canada
- Embassy of Canada, Kyiv
