= Horodnia urban hromada =

Horodnia urban hromada Городнянська міська громада
- Hromada
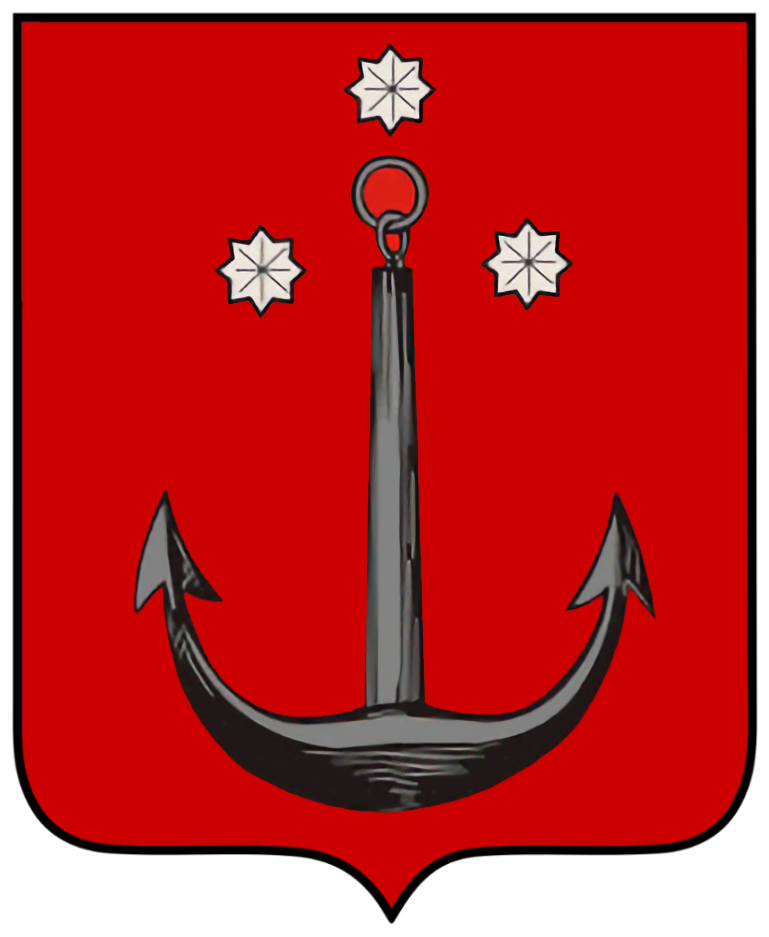
- Coat of arms
- Interactive map of Horodnia urban hromada
- Country: Ukraine
- Oblast: Chernihiv
- Raion: Chernihiv

Area
  - Total: 1,186.9 km^{2} (458.3 sq mi)

Population (2020)
  - Total: 21,388
  - Density: 18.020/km^{2} (46.672/sq mi)
- CATOTTG code: UA74100050000019554
- Settlements: 59
- Cities: 1
- Rural settlements: 4
- Villages: 54
- Website: gormr.gov.ua

Horodnia urban hromada (Ukrainian: Городнянська міська громада) is a hromada of Ukraine, located in Chernihiv Raion, Chernihiv Oblast. Its administrative center is the city Horodnia.

It has an area of 1,186.9 square kilometres (458.3 mi^{2}) and a population of 21,388, as of 2020.

== Composition ==
The hromada contains 61 settlements: 1 city (Horodnia), 54 villages:

- Avtunichi
- Alyoshinske
- Andriivka
- Barabanivske
- Berylivka
- Blizhne
- Budyshche
- Butivka
- Vahanichi
- Vokzal-Horodnya
- Volodymyrivka
- Hasychivka
- Hnizdyshche
- Horoshkivka
- Den-Dobriy
- Derevyny
- Dykhanivka
- Dibrivne
- Drozdovitsa
- Zalissya
- Zdryahivka
- Ilmivka
- Karpivka
- Kartovetske
- Konotop
- Kuznychi
- Kusii
- Lemeshivka
- Lyutizh
- Malcha
- Minaivshchyna
- Molozhava
- Mosty
- Moschenka
- Nevklya
- Pavlo-Ivanivske
- Pekurivka
- Perepis
- Pererost
- Pivnivshchyna
- Polissia
- Politrudnya
- Svitanok
- Senkivka
- Sloboda
- Smychyn
- Solonivka
- Starosillia
- Stovpivka
- Studenets
- Sutoky
- Travneve
- Horobychi
- Khotivlia
- Khrypivka
- Cheretske

And 4 rural-type settlements: Vershiny, Zelene, Rubizh, and Yasenivka.

== Geography ==
The Horodnia urban hromada is located in the south of Chernihiv Raion, near the state border of Ukraine with Belarus. Area – 1186.9 km^{2}. The territory of the hromada is located within the Dnieper Lowland. The relief of the surface of the district is a lowland plain, sometimes dissected by river valleys. All rivers belong to the Dnieper basin.

The climate of Horodnia urban hromada is moderately continental, with warm summers and relatively mild winters. The average temperature in January is about -7°C, and in July - +19°C. The average annual precipitation ranges from 550 to 660 mm, with the highest precipitation in the summer period.

The most common are sod-podzolic and gray forest soils. The Horodnia urban hromada is located in the natural zone of mixed forests, in Polissya. The main species in the forests are pine, oak, alder, ash, birch. Minerals – loam, peat, sand. The Horodnia urban hromada specializes in forestry, food and processing industry.

The national road H28 passes through the district. The railway to Bakhmach of the Southwestern Railway passes through the hromada.

== See also ==
- List of hromadas of Ukraine
