= Khrypivka =

Rural locality in Chernihiv Oblast, Ukraine

Khrypivka Хрипівка
- Location in Chernihiv Oblast Khrypivka (Chernihiv Oblast)
- Coordinates: 51°52′4″N 31°37′25″E
- Country: Ukraine
- Oblast: Chernihiv Oblast
- Raion: Chernihiv Raion
- Hromada: Horodnia urban hromada
- Time zone: UTC+2 (EET)
  - Summer (DST): UTC+3 (EEST)
- Postal code: 15106

Khrypivka (Ukrainian: Хрипівка) is a village in the Horodnia urban hromada of the Chernihiv Raion of Chernihiv Oblast in Ukraine.

== History ==
On 19 July 2020, as a result of the administrative-territorial reform and liquidation of the Horodnia Raion, the village became part of the Chernihiv Raion.

== Notable residents ==
- Levko Lukianenko (1928–2018), Ukrainian politician, Soviet dissident, and Hero of Ukraine
