= Nikolai Amosov =

Ukrainian soviet and Ukrainian surgeon

Nikolai Amosov Николай Амосов Микола Амосов
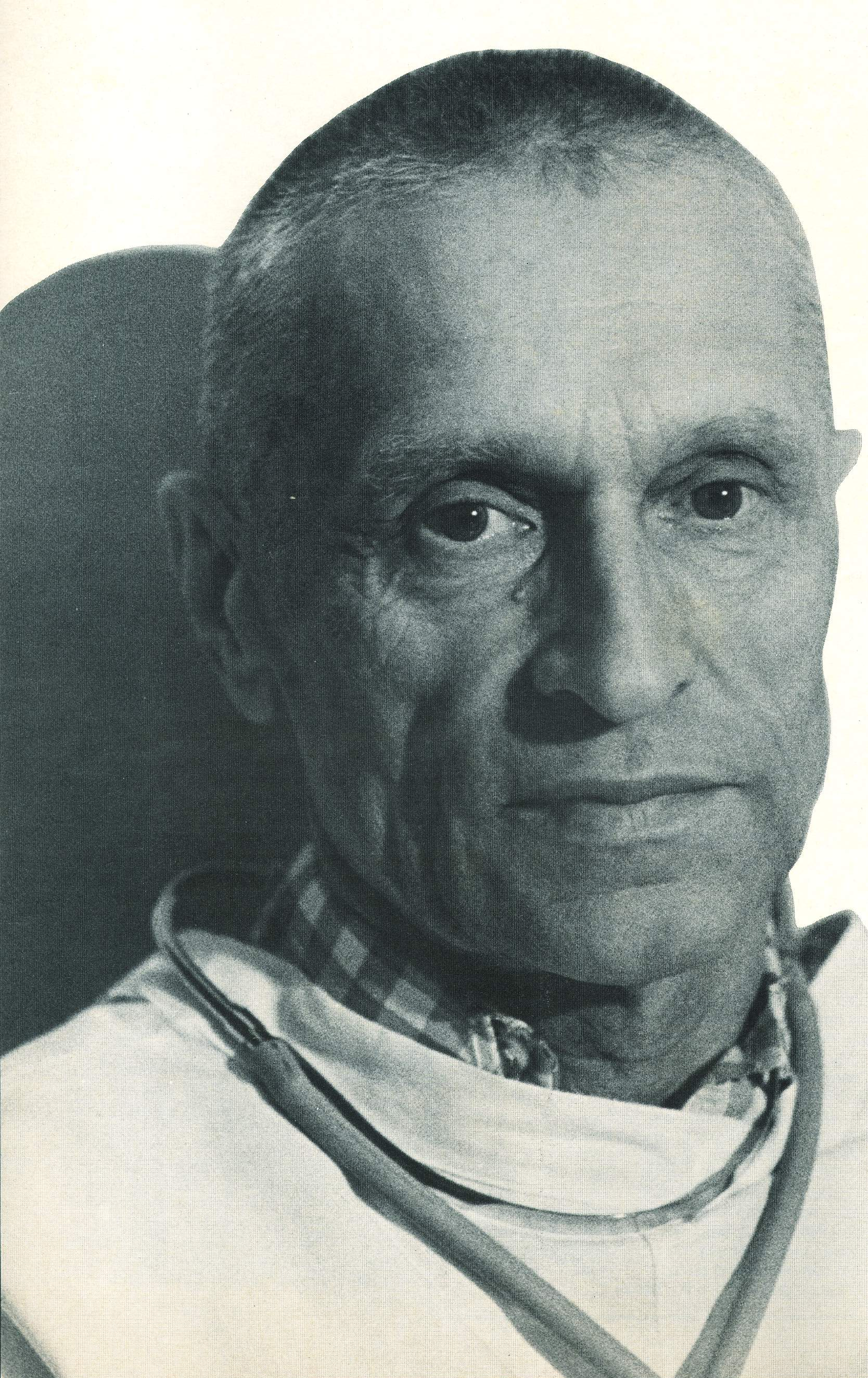
- Nikolai Amosov, circa 1984
- Born: December 6, 1913; Olkhovo, Novgorod Governorate, Russian Empire (now in Vologda Oblast, Russia)
- Died: December 12, 2002 (aged 89); Kyiv, Ukraine
- Other name: Mykola Amosov
- Occupation: Doctor

Nikolai Mikhailovich Amosov (Note: Russian: Николай Михайлович Амосов), Doctor of Science, Professor (December 6, 1913 – December 12, 2002), also known as Mykola Mykhailovych Amosov (Ukrainian: Микола Михайлович Амосов) was a Soviet and Ukrainian doctor of Russian origin, heart surgeon, inventor, best-selling author, and exercise enthusiast, known for his inventions of several surgical procedures for treating heart defects.

Born to Russian peasants, Nikolai fought in World War II. After the war he moved to Kyiv and in 1965 wrote The Thoughts and the Heart, selling millions of copies. He was the recipient of multiple awards.

== Biography ==
Amosov was born December 6, 1913, in the village of Olkhovo then in Cherepovetsky Uyezd, Novgorod Governorate, Russian Empire (now flooded by the Rybinsk Reservoir) to Russian peasants. In 1932 he graduated from Cherepovets Mechanical College, followed by 3 years of work as a shift mechanic at the Arkhangelsk electric power station. In 1939 he graduated from the Arkhangelsk Medical Institute, and in 1940 - with distinction from the All-Union Correspondence Industrial Institute. During World War II he was at the front as the leading surgeon of a field mobile hospital PPG-2266 at the Ukrainian village Khorobichi. From 1947 to 1952 he worked as chief surgeon of the Bryansk region and at that time he began to be widely engaged in thoracic surgery, he conducted extensive scientific work and in 1953 he presented his doctoral dissertation.

In 1952, Amosov, as a prominent specialist in thoracic surgery, was invited to the Kyiv Institute of Tuberculosis, to guide specially created clinic of thoracic surgery.

Here particularly fully revealed his many-sided talent of the surgeon and researcher, physiologist, and engineer, has been particularly fruitful scientific, organizational, practical, educational and social activities.

Amosov was one of the initiators of the widespread introduction into our country surgery for diseases of the lungs, has made a lot of new developments in this problem. His research contributed to improving the treatment of diseases of the lungs. In 1961, Amosov was awarded Lenin Prize for the work of lung surgery.

In the future, the main focus of Amosov's work was the heart surgery. In 1955 he was the first in Ukraine began treatment for heart diseases surgically, in 1958, one was one of the first in the Soviet Union to introduce into the practice the method of artificial blood circulation (in 1963), Amosov was first in the Soviet Union to perform the mitral valve replacement, and in 1965 for the first time in the world he created and introduced into practice the anti-thrombotic heart valves prosthesis. Amosov elaborated a number of new methods of surgical treatment of heart lesions, the original model of heart-lung machine. His work on the surgical treatment of heart diseases won a State Prize of Ukraine (1988) gold medals (1967, 1982) and Silver Medal (1978) of the Exhibition of Economic Achievements of the USSR.

The clinic established by Amosov, produced about 7000 lung resections, more than 95000 operations for heart diseases, including about 36,000 operations with extra-corporeal blood circulation.

In 1983 Amosov's cardiac surgery clinic was reorganized in Kyiv Research Institute of Cardiovascular Surgery and in the Ukrainian Republican cardiovascular surgical center. Each year, the institute fulfilled about 3000 heart operations, including over 1500 - with extra-corporeal blood circulation. Amosov was the first director of the Institute, and since 1988 - Honorary Director of the Institute.

In 1955, Amosov created and headed the first in the USSR Chair of Thoracic Surgery for the postgraduate studies and later the Chair of Anesthesiology. These Chairs have prepared more than 700 specialists for Ukraine and other republics.

Along with surgery Amosov paid much attention to contemporary problems of biological, medical and psychological cybernetics. From 1959 to 1990 he headed the Department of Biological Cybernetics in the Institute of Cybernetics. Under the leadership of Amosov fundamental studies of the self-regulation of the heart systems were conducted and the issues of machine diagnosis of heart disease were studied, elaboration and creation of physiological models of "internal environment", computer modeling of basic mental functions, and some socio-psychological mechanisms of human behavior were done. Innovative approach, the original views of Amosov were widely recognized in our country and abroad. For his research in the field of Bio-cybernetics in 1978 and 1997 he was awarded the State Prize of Ukraine.

In the 1989 Soviet Union legislative election he was elected into the Congress of People's Deputies of the Soviet Union as an independent candidate in Kyiv (he had declared his support for People's Movement of Ukraine). Amosov believed that the Western society should serve as an ideal for the USSR.

Amosov is the author of more than 400 scientific publications including 19 monographs. Some monographs reprinted in the U.S., Japan, Germany and Bulgaria.

40 doctoral degrees and over 150 PhD's of sciences were presented in his Institute, many of them are chiefs of major scientific centers in Ukrainian SSR and other republics of the Soviet Union. It is noteworthy that under the leadership of Amosov, one of his disciples Victor Skumin discovered a previously unknown disease. Now it is called Skumin syndrome (a disorder of the central nervous system of some patients after a prosthetic heart valve).

N. Amosov was a member of the Presidium of the Board of the Ukrainian Society of surgeons and cardiologists, the International Association of surgeons and cardiologists, the International Association of Surgeons and the International Society of Cardiovascular Surgeons, International Society for Medical Cybernetics, Scientific Council on Cybernetics of Ukraine, member of the editorial boards of a number of domestic and foreign journals.

His scientific work Amosov combined with a great social activity, was a member of the Supreme Soviet of the Soviet Union five times.

Amosov is widely known as a writer. His novels and essays "The Thoughts and the Heart", "Notes from the Future", "PPG-2266. Field Surgeon Notes", "The Book of Happiness and Miseries", "Voices of the Times", "Artificial Intelligence", "My Health System" have been repeatedly published in Ukraine and abroad.

== Legacy ==
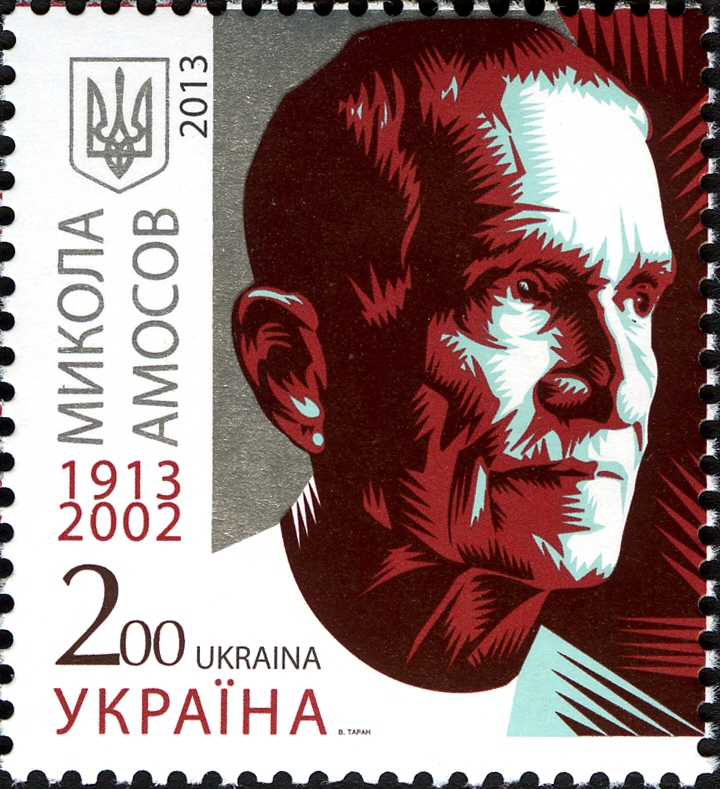
Stamp of Ukraine, 2013

By the order of Cabinet of Ministers of Ukraine No. 128-p of 12 March 2003 the Institute of Cardiovascular Surgery of the Academy of Medical Sciences of Ukraine was named after Amosov.

In 2003 a street in Kyiv was named after Amosov and the National Academy of Sciences of Ukraine established the Mykola Amosov Prize which is awarded for the significant scientific works in the field of the cardio-vascular surgery and transplantology.

== Honours and awards ==
Amosov was the recipient of multiple orders including Hero of Socialist Labour title, two Orders of Lenin, the Order of the Patriotic War, two Orders of the Red Star, and Lenin Prize. In 2008 he was recognized as second after Yaroslav I the Wise among the Great Ukrainians by a public poll conducted for the TV show The Greatest Ukrainians.
