= Levko Lukianenko =

Ukrainian human rights activist and politician

Hero of Ukraine Levko Lukianenko
- Левко Лук'яненко
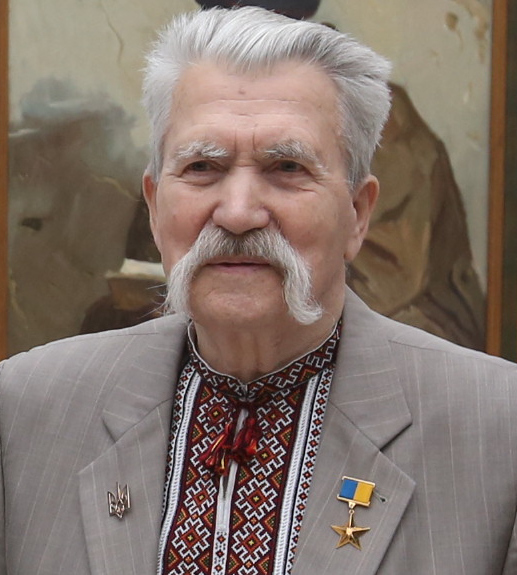
- Lukianenko in 2016

1st Ambassador of Ukraine to Canada
- In office 14 May 1992 – 15 October 1993
- Preceded by: Position established
- Succeeded by: Victor Batiuk

People's Deputy of Ukraine
- In office 14 May 2002 – 15 June 2007
- Constituency: Yulia Tymoshenko Bloc No. 5 (2002–2006); Yulia Tymoshenko Bloc No. 6 (2006–2007)
- In office 15 May 1990 – 12 May 1998
- Constituency: Ivano-Frankivsk Oblast, No. 196 (1990–1994); Volyn Oblast, No. 68 (1994–1998)

Personal details
- Born: 24 August 1928 Khrypivka, Ukrainian SSR, Soviet Union (now Ukraine)
- Died: 7 July 2018 (aged 89) Kyiv, Ukraine
- Party: URP
- Other political affiliations: CPSU (1953–1961)
- Spouse: Nadiia Buhaievska
- Education: Moscow State University
- Occupation: Jurist; politician; writer
- Awards: Hero of Ukraine (2005); Order of Prince Yaroslav the Wise (2007); Shevchenko National Prize (2016)

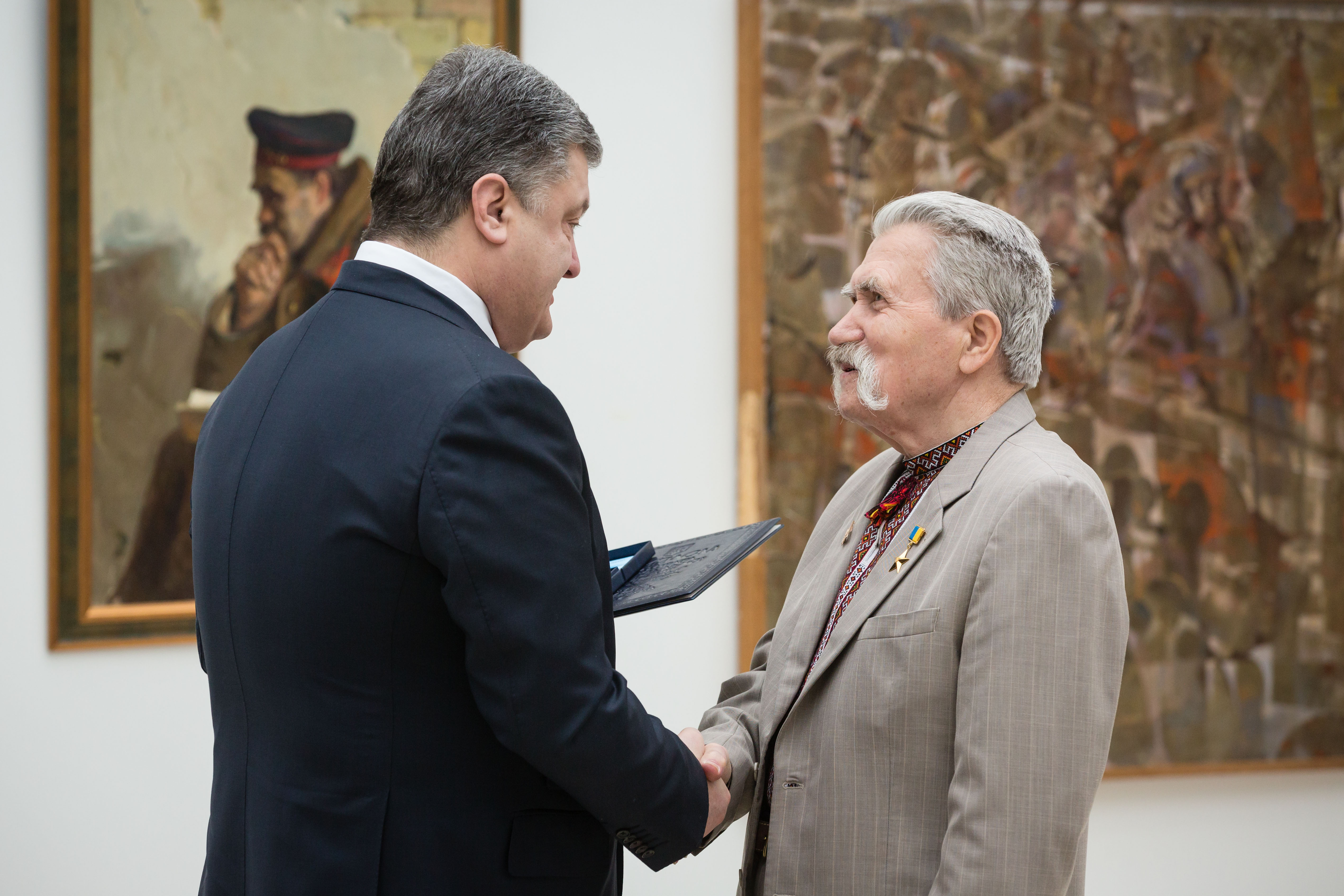
President Petro Poroshenko awards Lukianenko the 2016 Shevchenko National Prize

Levko Hryhorovych Lukianenko (Note: Also transliterated as Lukyanenko) (Ukrainian: Левко Григорович Лук'яненко; 24 August 1928 – 7 July 2018) was a Ukrainian Soviet dissident and politician. He was one of the founders of the Ukrainian Helsinki Group in 1976 and was elected a leader of the Ukrainian Helsinki Union in 1988.

Lukianenko is the author of the Declaration of Independence of Ukraine.

== Early life and career ==
Lukianenko was born on 24 August 1928 in the Khrypivka village of Horodnia Raion, Soviet Union. During World War II in 1944, he was recruited in the Soviet Red Army aged 15, as he lied that he had been born in 1927, and served in Austria and then in the Caucasus region, specifically the cities of Ordzhonikidze and Nakhichevan. In Austria, he observed the arrival of Ukrainian wheat in Baden bei Wien, which reminded him of the removal of grain from Ukraine when he almost starved in the 1930s during the Holodomor. That event made Lukianenko to "follow Severyn Nalyvaiko's path – I would fight for an independent Ukraine."

In 1953, Lukianenko enrolled in the Law Department of Moscow State University and joined the Communist Party of the Soviet Union (CPSU). Lukianenko later claimed that he had joined the CPSU only "to do the highest for Ukraine." In university, Lukianenko later claimed, he was nicknamed khokhol, an ethnic slur against Ukrainians. Soon after he graduated in 1958, Lukianenko was directed as a propagandist to Radekhiv Raion Communist Party committee. Lukianenko claimed that after the 1956 20th Congress, "I stopped pretending I was a party member."

== Dissident activity ==
In 1959, during the Khrushchev Thaw, he organized a dissident movement in Hlyniany, the Ukrainian Workers and Peasants Union, along with Ivan Kandyba and others. Lukianenko defended the right of secession of Ukraine from the rest of Soviet Union, a right that was theoretically granted by the 1936 Soviet Constitution (Articles 17 and 125). In May 1961, he was expelled from the party, arrested, tried, and sentenced by the Lviv Oblast Court to death for separatism, "undermining the credibility of the CPSU, and defaming the theory of Marxism-Leninism." After 72 days, his sentence was later commuted to 15 years in a prison camp. Lukianenko served his sentence at first in Mordovia (Dubravlag, OLP #10, in Sosnovka, Zubovo-Polyansky District) and then in Vladimir, at the Vladimir Central Prison (infamous for its brutality). Soon after his release in 1976, he moved to Chernihiv and became a founding member of the Ukrainian Helsinki Group. In 1977, he was arrested again and was sentenced by Chernihiv Oblast Court to 10 years in a camp and 5 years of internal exile for "Anti-Soviet agitation and propaganda." He served this sentence in the special-regime unit of Perm-36 at Kuchino.

In 1988, Lukianenko was released in the wave of Mikhail Gorbachev's perestroika. He refused to emigrate as a condition for his release, but he was released anyway in November 1988. In total, he had spent 27 years in prison.

== Political career ==
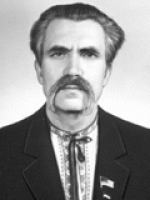
Lukiakenko as a member of the 1st Verkhovna Rada

Lukianenko was elected a member of the Verkhovna Rada (Ukraine's parliament) in March 1990 and became the head of the new Ukrainian Republican Party the following month. He was the co-author of Declaration of State Sovereignty of Ukraine and the author of Declaration of Independence of Ukraine, adopted in 1991. In the 1991 Ukrainian presidential election, Lukianenko finished third with 4.5% of the vote.

From May 1992 to November 1993, Lukianenko was the first Ukrainian ambassador to Canada. In protest of government policies, he resigned.

From 1994 to 1998, Lukianenko was a People's Deputy of Ukraine from the 68th electoral district, representing the city of Novovolynsk.

During the 1998 Ukrainian parliamentary election, his Ukrainian Republican Party was part (together with the Congress of Ukrainian Nationalists and the Ukrainian Conservative Republican Party) of the Election Bloc "National Front" and he headed the electoral list of the alliance. Since it did not overcome the 4% election barrier, however, he was not elected to the Verkhovna Rada.

Lukianenko was awarded the title Hero of Ukraine by President Viktor Yushchenko on 19 April 2005.

In 2006, Lukianenko was again elected as a member of the Verkhovna Rada. He was elected with the Bloc of Yulia Tymoshenko. He was again re-elected for the bloc in the 2007 Ukrainian parliamentary election, but on 15 June 2007, he resigned his mandate at his own request.

In 2006 and, after an interval, again in 2010, Lukianenko was elected leader of the Ukrainian Republican Party.

Lukianenko was awarded the Order of Prince Yaroslav the Wise (V degree) in 2007.

In 2016, Lukianenko was awarded the Shevchenko National Prize.

=== Controversial remarks ===
In 2005, Lukianenko participated in a conference entitled "Zionism as the Biggest Threat to Modern Civilization," which was controversial for its antisemitic tone and his invitation of the former Ku Klux Klan Grand Wizard David Duke. Lukianenko sat next to Duke and gave him a standing ovation. Presenting his own paper, Lukianenko argued that the Holodomor had been carried out by a Satanic government controlled by the Jews. According to Lukianenko, 95% of Soviet people's commissars most military and judicial commissars, and Lenin and Stalin were Jewish and "thus... of the most important administrative positions... 80% were Jews."

Lukianenko disputed the existence of antisemitism in Ukraine, claiming he had "not met a single Ukrainian who is opposed to all Semitic people." According to Lukianenko, Ukrainians base their attitudes of other ethnic groups upon "their attitudes towards us."

In a 2008 article for Personal-Plus magazine Lukianenko argued that Ukrainians, as "a white race," should not mix with other races. He suggested that a Ukrainian who wants to marry a person of a different race should leave Ukraine and renounce Ukrainian citizenship.

== Death ==
Lukianenko died in a Kyiv hospital on 7 July 2018 from leukemia. He was buried in Kyiv's Baikove Cemetery on 10 July 2018. Ukrainian President Petro Poroshenko attended his funeral in Kyiv's Saint Volodymyr's Cathedral, and the funeral service was led by the head of the Ukrainian Orthodox Church of the Kyivan Patriarchate, Patriarch Filaret.

== Honours ==
On 27 October 2022 the Kyiv City Council renamed the (Soviet) Marshala Tymoshenko Street in its Obolonskyi District to Levko Lukianenko Street.

On 22 February 2023 the city council of Dnipro renamed the Vasily Zhukovsky street on Dnipro's Sobornyi District to Levko Lukianenko street.

On 20 May 2024 the Poltava city council renamed a street in its city in honour of Lukianenko.

== Personal life ==
Lukianenko was married to Nadiia Buhaievska (born in 1943); the couple had no children.

== See also ==
- Soviet dissidents
