= 5 Kanal =

Ukrainian television channel

- Country: Ukraine
- Headquarters: Kyiv

Programming
- Picture format: 16:9 (1080i, HDTV)

Ownership
- Owner: Free Media Holding

History
- Launched: September 1, 2003

Links
- Website: 5.ua

Availability

Terrestrial
- Zeonbud: MUX5 (31)

Streaming media
- Web: Channel 5 Live

5 Kanal (Ukrainian: 5 канал, lit. 'Channel 5') is a television station in Ukraine formerly owned by businessman and the fifth president of Ukraine Petro Poroshenko.

The channel became well known as the first major broadcaster during the 2004 presidential election offering critical broadcasting on candidate Viktor Yanukovych. The whole staff of the channel went on hunger strike when (at the time, late 2004) the government threatened to close it. According to the Ukrainian media watchdog Telekrytyka Kanal 5 and TVi were the only remaining TV channels mid-May 2010 with independent and fair TV news coverage.

Poroshenko sold the channel shortly after an anti-oligarch law was passed in November 2021.

== History ==
=== Background ===
5 Kanal was founded by NBM, which was itself founded in Chernivtsi in 1995. At the time, the priority areas of the company's activity were its regional TV channel and the Western Ukrainian radio network Niko FM. The company received broadcasting licences in 12 regions soon afterwards, and then began satellite broadcasting.

TRK NBM cooperated with CJSC MMC-STB, which together with Intermart Corporation owned this channel (this was the structure of the channel: 21% controlled STB, 30% - a company, "Intermart", and 49% - a company, "Niko-PR") between 1998 and 2000. Due to disagreements between the owners of the founders of these partners were excluded. Afterwards the channel was again an independent channel, until it was bought by Petro Poroshenko. In February 2001, the Express-Inform TV and Radio Company, founded in 1993 in Kyiv as an economic news studio, appeared on the Ukrainian ether. In August 2002, the channel began broadcasting in Kyiv.

=== Launch ===
In 2003, NBM and Express-Inform created 5 Kanal. The idea and concept of the channel belongs to journalists Andriy Shevchenko, Roman Skrypin and Yevhen Hlibovytsky, who left Novyi Kanal, STB and 1 + 1 TV channels due to censorship, respectively. Since its inception, 5 Kanal has positioned itself as an "honest news channel." In the same year, journalists, executives and owners of the channel signed an agreement on the principles of operation, which forbade the owners to interfere in the process of news production, and adopted the principles of editorial policy.

=== Changes in format ===
In February 2005, a change in the channel's format was announced - the channel declared itself the "first information" channel. On March 14, 2005, entertainment and music programs, feature films, etc. were removed from the airwaves, leaving only news, documentaries, analytical and journalistic programs, and programs about tourism. At the same time, the head of the news service, Andriy Shevchenko, left the channel and was replaced by Roman Skrypin. In May 2006, Roman Skrypin also left the channel, claiming that there was no development and that the channel's decision-making system had been disrupted-in particular, the appointment of a new news editor-in-chief took place without discussion with him as editor-in-chief channel.

In 2007, 5 Kanal started the new year with a new program grid built on the principle of "horizontal lines". All news content was divided into blocks, each of which had a fixed place in the program grid. A fundamentally new structure of news was built, the total number of information messages increased from 40 to more than 60.

=== Coverage of events in Ukraine ===
During the 2004 presidential election, 5 Kanal was the only television channel which provided airtime to both the government and the opposition. Employees of the channel complained of pressure from the authorities and pro-government politicians. On October 7, 2004, 5 Kanal owner Petro Poroshenko sharply criticized and accused Volodymyr Sivkovych, chairman of the parliamentary commission on the case of Viktor Yushchenko's poisoning, of "fulfilling Bankova's scenario." One week later, at the request of Sivkovich, the channel's bank accounts were blocked, after which the channel's journalists went on a hunger strike and the accounts were unblocked. To protect itself from closure, the channel even began a partial retransmission of sittings of the Verkhovna Rada of Ukraine, agreeing on a relevant agreement.

During the Orange Revolution, 5 Kanal switched to round-the-clock news broadcasting and broadcast live on Independence Square in Kyiv and other hotspots in the Ukrainian capital. Due to this, the rating of the channel reached record levels - after the audience, "5 Kanal" ranked third in the country, leaving only "Inter" and "1 + 1", which had a large coverage of the national television network.

On the night of January 1, 2020, the TV channel together with Pryamiy kanal broadcast Petro Poroshenko's address to citizens instead of the president of Ukraine's New Year's address. Volodymyr Zelenskyy's address appeared on TV channels after midnight.

=== Other events ===
In early June 2010, the court upheld the demands of the Inter TV channel group, annulling the National Council's decision a year and a half earlier to allocate 5 Kanal and TVi frequencies for broadcasting. Journalists from the TV channels said that the influence on the court decision of the head of the Security Service of Ukraine Valery Khoroshkovsky, who was also the owner of the group "Inter". On August 18, 2010, 5 Kanal's website shut down due to a DDOS attack. On August 25, 2011, the Ukrainian Independence TV Marathon, hosted by Tetyana Danylenko and Pavlo Kuzheev, set a new world record - 52 hours of continuous broadcasting. In October, the telethon was registered in the Guinness World Records. In March 2012, 5 Kanal and the RegioNews news agency began broadcasting press conferences in the RegioNews live media hall.

On February 18, 2014, 5 Kanal was disconnected from the terrestrial, cable networks and satellite broadcasts almost all over Ukraine due to the coverage of the assault by Euromaidan security forces on Independence Square in Kyiv, but the broadcast was later resumed. Since the spring of 2014, the channel has been repeatedly reported by unknown individuals saying that the channel was mined (this happened for the thirteenth time on November 15, 2014), which stopped its operation at the time of the search for the explosives. Since September 5, 2016, the TV channel broadcasts in 16:9 format. In January 2019, there was a re-switching of 5 Kanal and Pryamiy kanal, as a result of which Pryamiy kanal switched to MX-2 multiplex, and 5 Kanal switched to MX-5 multiplex. On May 31, 2019, the host of 5 Kanal Vitaliy Haidukevich was elected to the central political council of the European Solidarity party.

On October 10, 2019, the TV channel launched an HD version on the Astra 4A satellite.

=== Change in ownership in 2021 ===
In November 2021, Poroshenko sold the channel, along with Pryamiy, shortly after President Zelenskyy signed the anti-oligarch bill into law. The channel is now owned by Free Media Holding, which includes "media workers, public figures, opposition deputies from among journalists", according to a statement released on the channel's website.

== Criticism ==
On 1 December 2016, the German newspaper Frankfurter Allgemeine Zeitung reported that seven employees of the channel's editorial office revealed they had been involved in tax fraud, having received money through the double-entry bookkeeping system for several years.

== Satellite broadcasting ==
Satellite	Frequency	Polarization	symbolic speed	FEC	Coding
Astra 4A (5 ° E)	12284 MHz	vertical	27500	3/4	FTA
Amos (4 ° W)	11175 MHz	horizontal	30000	3/4	FTA

== Notable journalists associated with the station ==
- Andriy Shevchenko
- Roman Skrypin
- Hanna Homonai
- Tetyana Danylenko
- Yevhen Hlibovytsky
- Svyatoslav Tseholko
- Lidiya Taran
