= Ihor Ostash =

Ukrainian diplomat and politician

- Ігор Осташ
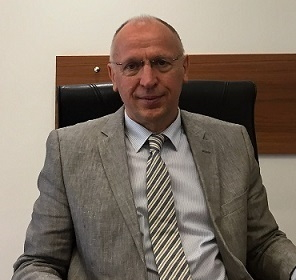
- Ostash in 2016

Ambassador of Ukraine to Lebanon
- Incumbent
- Assumed office 23 August 2016
- President: Petro Poroshenko; Volodymyr Zelenskyy
- Preceded by: Vitaliy Borovko

Ambassador of Ukraine to Canada
- In office 11 September 2006 – 16 June 2011
- President: Viktor Yushchenko; Viktor Yanukovych
- Preceded by: Mykola Maimeskul
- Succeeded by: Marko Shevchenko

People's Deputy of Ukraine
- In office 11 May 1994 – 25 May 2006
- Preceded by: Constituency established
- Succeeded by: Constituency abolished (1998, 2006); Ivan Havryliuk (2002)
- Constituency: Lviv Oblast, Stryi (1994–1998); Lviv Oblast, No. 126 (1998–2002); Lviv Oblast, No. 127 (2002–2006)

Personal details
- Born: 4 August 1959 (age 67) Duliby, Ukrainian SSR, Soviet Union (now Ukraine)
- Party: Reforms and Order Party (since 1998)
- Other political affiliations: Christian Democratic Party (until 1998); Our Ukraine Bloc (2002–2006)
- Education: University of Lviv

Ihor Ivanovych Ostash (Ukrainian: Ігор Іванович Осташ; born 4 August 1959) is a Ukrainian diplomat and politician currently serving as ambassador of Ukraine to Lebanon since 2016, previously serving as ambassador of Ukraine to Canada from 2006 to 2011. He also served as a People's Deputy of Ukraine from Lviv Oblast from 1994 to 2006. He is a member of the Reforms and Order Party.

== Early life and education ==
Ihor Ostash was born on 4 August 1959 in the village of Duliby (Lviv Oblast, Ukraine). Ostash graduated from Lviv Ivan Franko State University (Ukraine), Slavic Department of the Philological Faculty (1982). Academy of Sciences of Ukraine, Post-graduate Studies (1985); Harvard University (United States) Post-doctorate studies (1993); Taras Shevchenko National University of Kyiv (Ukraine), Law Faculty (1998). Ph.D. in Philology (1986). Languages: Ukrainian, English, French, Czech, Polish, Slovak, Serbian, Croatian, Russian.

== Professional career ==
From 1986 to 1994, Ostash was a member of the Academy of Sciences of Ukraine's Oleksandr Potebnya Institute of Linguistics, researcher Department of Literature, Language and Art in the Presidium of the Academy of Sciences, academic secretary International School of Ukrainian Studies, director.

From 1994 to 2006 Ostash was a People's Deputy of Ukraine, serving as Chairman of the Committee on Foreign Affairs from 2000 to 2002. He was Vice President of the OSCE Parliamentary Assembly (1999–2005). Member of the Executive Committee of the Inter-Parliamentary Union (IPU) (2001–2003).

From 2006 to 2011 – Ambassador Extraordinary and Plenipotentiary of Ukraine to Canada and Permanent Representative of Ukraine to the International Civil Aviation Organization (ICAO).

Since 23 August 2016 – Ambassador Extraordinary and Plenipotentiary of Ukraine in the Lebanese Republic.
