= Yuliya Kovaliv =

Ukrainian diplomat

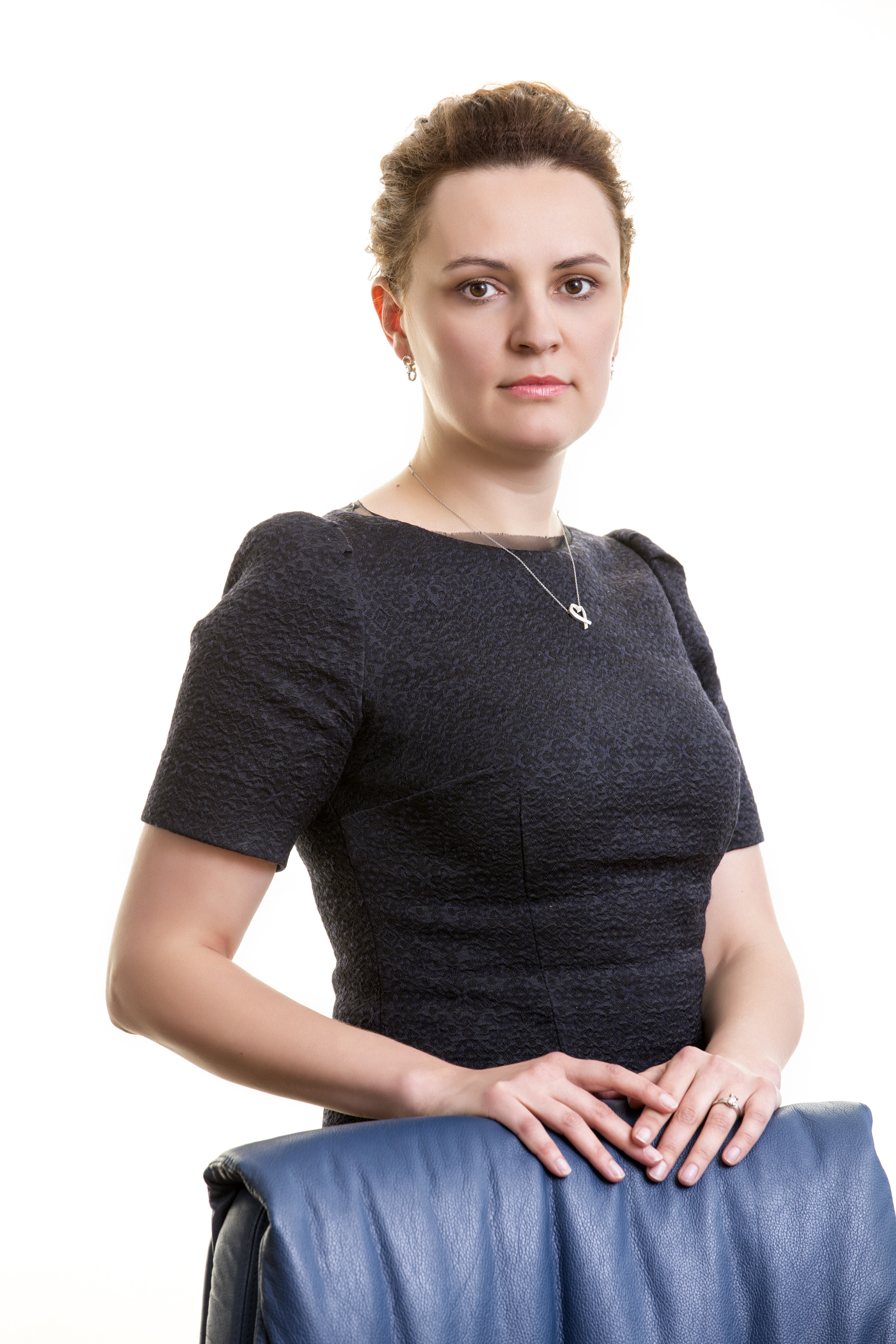
Kovaliv in 2016

Yuliya Ihorivna Kovaliv (Ukrainian: Юлія Ігорівна Ковалів; born January 9, 1985) is a Ukrainian diplomat and former Ukrainian Ambassador to Canada (2022–2025).

== Education ==
In 2006, Kovaliv gained a specialist degree in economic theory from National University of Kyiv-Mohyla Academy. She has a master's degree in social development management from the National Academy of State Administration of the President of Ukraine.

== Career ==
In her early career, Kovaliv worked in the Ukrainian division of Ernst & Young, an international consulting and auditing company. From 2007 to 2010, she was the Chief Financial Officer of Gazex Ukraine Llp.

In 2010, Kovaliv became the coordinator of the Coordination Center for the implementation of economic reforms under the President of Ukraine, and in 2014, she was appointed a member of the National Commission for State Regulation of Energy and Public Utilities.

In December 2014 Kovaliv was appointed Acting head of the National Commission for State Regulation of Energy and Public Utilities. She served as First Deputy Minister of economic development and trade of Ukraine from 2015 to November 2016, and Head of the Supervisory Board of the National Joint Stock Company Naftogaz of Ukraine for a year between April 2016 and April 2017. In January 2017, she became Head of the Office of the National Investment Council under the President of Ukraine.

From September 20, 2019 to December 22, 2020, Kovaliv was Deputy Head of the Office of the President of Ukraine.

On March 9, 2022, Kovaliv was appointed Ukrainian ambassador to Canada.
