= Onokhoy =

Onokhoy Онохой
- Urban-type settlement

Other transcription(s)
  - Buryat: Нохой
- Interactive map of Onokhoy
- Location of Onokhoy Onokhoy (Republic of Buryatia)
- Coordinates: 51°56′N 108°03′E
- Country: Russia
- Federal subject: Buryatia
- Administrative district: Zaigrayevsky District
- Urban-type settlementSelsoviet: Onokhoy Urban-Type Settlement
- Founded: 1899
- Elevation: 542 m (1,778 ft)

Population (2010 Census)
  - Total: 10,689
  - Estimate (2025): 9,143 (−14.5%)

Administrative status
  - Capital of: Onokhoy Urban-Type Settlement

Municipal status
  - Municipal district: Zaigrayevsky Municipal District
  - Urban settlement: Onokhoy Urban Settlement
  - Capital of: Onokhoy Urban Settlement
- Time zone: UTC+8 (MSK+5)
- Postal codes: 671300, 671302, 671303
- OKTMO ID: 81618165051

Onokhoy population
- 2010 Census: 10,689
- 2002 Census: 10,673
- 1989 Census: 10,715
- 1979 Census: 10,430

Onokhoy (Russian: Онохо́й; Buryat: Нохой, Nokhoi) is an urban locality (an urban-type settlement) in Zaigrayevsky District of the Republic of Buryatia, Russia. As of the 2010 Census, its population was 10,689.

== Administrative and municipal status ==
Within the framework of administrative divisions, the urban-type settlement (inhabited locality) of Onokhoy is, together with two rural localities (the selo of Todogto and the settlement of Nizhniye Taltsy), incorporated within Zaigrayevsky District as Onokhoy Urban-Type Settlement (an administrative division of the district). As a municipal division, the territories of Onokhoy and Todogto, together with two rural localities in Dabatuysky Somon (the selo of Stary Onokhoy and the ulus of Onokhoy-Shibir), are incorporated within Zaigrayevsky Municipal District as Onokhoy Urban Settlement. The settlement of Nizhniye Taltsy is municipally incorporated as Taletskoye Rural Settlement in Zaigrayevsky Municipal District.
