= Oksen Lisovyi =

Ukrainian teacher, educational organizer, soldier (born 1972)

- Оксен Лісовий
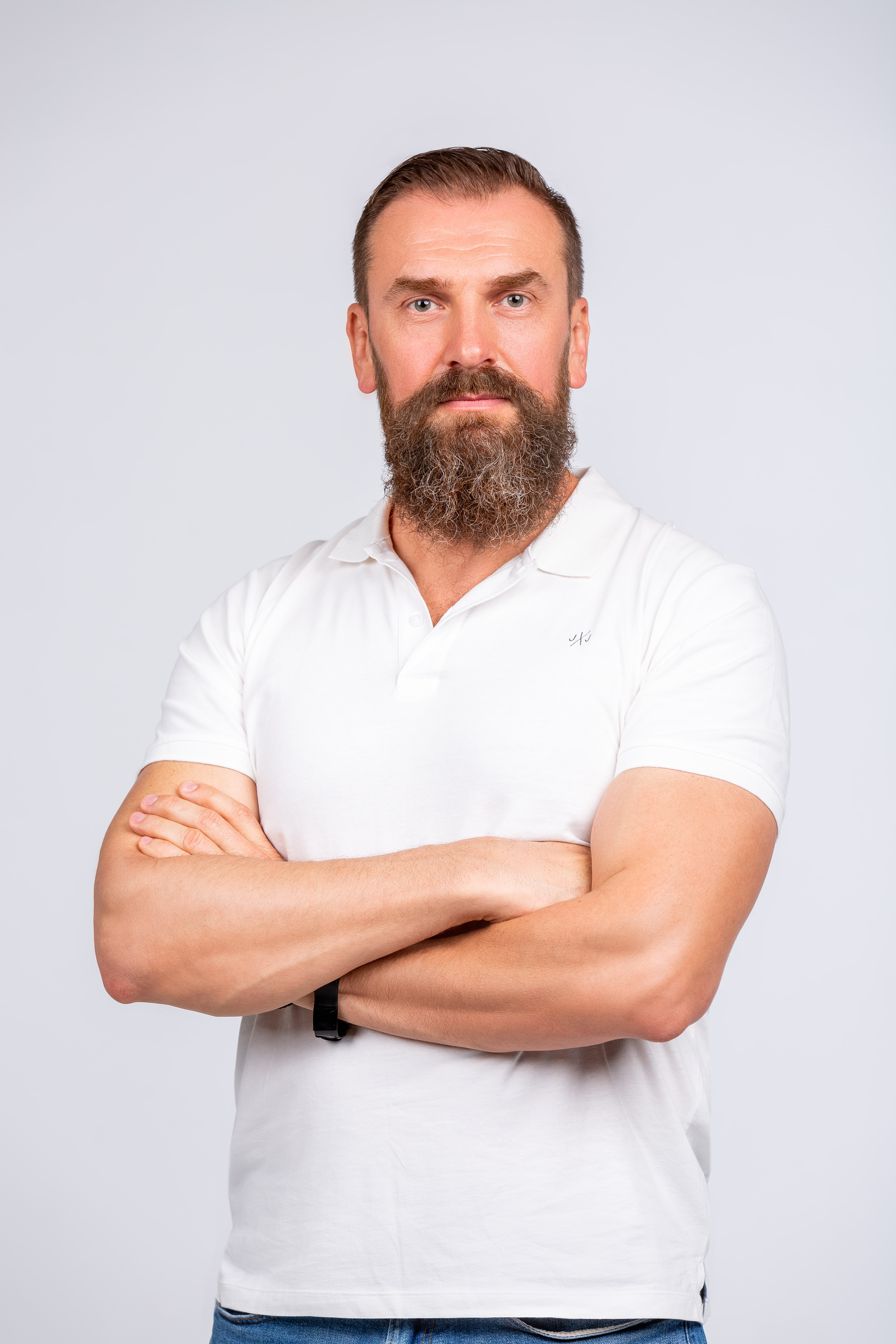
- Lisovyi in 2020

Minister of Education and Science
- In office 21 March 2023 – 16 July 2026
- President: Volodymyr Zelenskyy
- Prime Minister: Denys Shmyhal; Yulia Svyrydenko
- Preceded by: Serhiy Shkarlet
- Succeeded by: Andrii Butenko

Personal details
- Born: 21 July 1972 (age 54) Kyiv Oblast, Ukrainian SSR, Soviet Union
- Education: Kyiv National University of Culture and Arts; Candidate of Philosophy (2012); Docent (2015)

Oksen Vasyliovych Lisovyi (Ukrainian: Оксен Васильович Лісовий; born 21 July 1972) is a Ukrainian teacher, educational organiser and soldier of the Armed Forces of Ukraine. He has directed the National Center "Minor Academy of Sciences of Ukraine" since 10 June 2010. Between 21 March 2023 and 16 July 2026 Lisovyi served as Minister of Education and Science of Ukraine.

== Biography ==
Lisovyi is the son of Soviet dissident Vasyl Lisovyi and his mother Vira Lisova was his fathers' lawyer. She defended him (and took care of their son and daughter there) when he was on trial in the summer of 1981 in Novaya Bryan in the Buryat ASSR where Vasyl Lisovyi was in exile. In the summer of 1982, the family returned to the Buryat ASSR and lived in exile for two years in the village of Ilka, where Vasyl Lisovyi worked as a gym coach.

Lisovyi is a graduate of the Kyiv National University of Culture and Arts. He worked as a teacher at the National University of Kyiv-Mohyla Academy, as a fencing coach and supported the activities of the public youth organization "Sich", in a managerial position in Ukrtelecom.

In 2010 Lisovyi became director of the Minor Academy of Sciences of Ukraine.

Lisovyi had a PhD (Doctor of Philosophy) in philosophy, he defended his thesis (Note: On the day of his appointment as education minister, 21 March 2023, Lisovyi's 2012 thesis was accused of plagiarism; Lisovyi responded that he had "zero tolerance for academic dishonesty" and that he was ready to give up the academic degree if plagiarism was discovered "to form a fundamentally new academic culture and the culture of educational and scientific management.") in 2012. Ukrainian Pacifist Movement published evidence of plagiarism in it, and Lisovyi submitted his PhD thesis for review to the National Agency for Quality Assurance in Higher Education. On 30 May 2023 Lisovyi voluntary gave up his Doctor of Philosophy degree, claiming "only academics should have academic degrees."

In September 2020 Lisovyi was one of the founders of the first Science Museum in Ukraine.

Following the February 2022 Russian invasion of Ukraine, Lisovyi volunteered into the 95th Air Assault Brigade.

On 21 March 2023, the Verkhovna Rada (Ukraine's national parliament) appointed Oksen Lisovyi as Minister of Education and Science of Ukraine.

Lisovyi is married, together with his wife he raises two sons.

== Awards ==
- Honored Worker of Education of Ukraine (2021)
- Laureate of the State Prize of Ukraine in Education (2012)
