= Atkhatay =

Atkhatay Атхатай
- Settlement
- Location within Republic of Buryatia Location within Russia
- Coordinates: 51°32′N 108°02′E
- Country: Russia
- Region: Republic of Buryatia
- District: Zaigrayevsky District
- Time zone: UTC+8:00

Atkhatay (Russian: Атхатай; Buryat: Адхаатай, Adkhaatai) is a rural locality (a settlement) in Zaigrayevsky District, Republic of Buryatia, Russia. The population was 224 as of 2010. There are 5 streets.

== Geography ==
Atkhatay is located 44 km south of Zaigrayevo (the district's administrative centre) by road. Staraya Bryan is the nearest rural locality.
