= Dede-Tala =

Dede-Tala Дэдэ-Тала
- Ulus
- Location within Republic of Buryatia Location within Russia
- Coordinates: 51°35′N 108°47′E
- Country: Russia
- Region: Republic of Buryatia
- District: Zaigrayevsky District
- Time zone: UTC+8:00

Dede-Tala (Russian: Дэдэ-Тала; Buryat: Дээдэ Тала, Deede Tala) is a rural locality (an ulus) in Zaigrayevsky District, Republic of Buryatia, Russia. The population was 75 as of 2010. There are 2 streets.

== Geography ==
Dede-Tala is located 54 km southeast of Zaigrayevo (the district's administrative centre) by road. Lesozavodskoy is the nearest rural locality.
