= Gorkhon =

Gorkhon Горхон
- Settlement
- Location within Republic of Buryatia Location within Russia
- Coordinates: 51°33′N 108°47′E
- Country: Russia
- Region: Republic of Buryatia
- District: Zaigrayevsky District
- Time zone: UTC+8:00

Gorkhon (Russian: Горхон) is a rural locality (a settlement) in Zaigrayevsky District, Republic of Buryatia, Russia. The population was 1,463 as of 2010. There are 16 streets.

== Geography ==
Gorkhon is located 58 km southeast of Zaigrayevo (the district's administrative centre) by road. Lesozavodskoy is the nearest rural locality.
