= Staraya Kurba =

Staraya Kurba Старая Курба
- Selo
- Location within Republic of Buryatia Location within Russia
- Coordinates: 52°00′N 108°30′E
- Country: Russia
- Region: Republic of Buryatia
- District: Zaigrayevsky District
- Time zone: UTC+8:00

Staraya Kurba (Russian: Старая Курба; Buryat: Хуушан Хγрбэ, Khuushan Khürbe) is a rural locality (a selo) in Zaigrayevsky District, Republic of Buryatia, Russia. The population was 549 as of 2010. There are 5 streets.

== Geography ==
Staraya Kurba is located 33 km northeast of Zaigrayevo (the district's administrative centre) by road. Novaya Kurba is the nearest rural locality.
