= Naryn, Zaigrayevsky District, Republic of Buryatia =

Naryn Нарын
- Ulus
- Location within Republic of Buryatia Location within Russia
- Coordinates: 51°42′N 109°04′E
- Country: Russia
- Region: Republic of Buryatia
- District: Zaigrayevsky District
- Time zone: UTC+8:00

Naryn (Russian: Нарын; Buryat: Нарин, Narin) is a rural locality (an ulus) in Zaigrayevsky District, Republic of Buryatia, Russia. The population was 219 as of 2010. There are 3 streets.

== Geography ==
Naryn is located 102 km northeast of Zaigrayevo (the district's administrative centre) by road. Tarbagatay is the nearest rural locality.
