= Staraya Bryan =

Staraya Bryan Старая Брянь
- Selo
- Location within Republic of Buryatia Location within Russia
- Coordinates: 51°35′N 108°08′E
- Country: Russia
- Region: Republic of Buryatia
- District: Zaigrayevsky District
- Time zone: UTC+8:00

Staraya Bryan (Russian: Старая Брянь; Buryat: Хуушан Бэрээн, Khuushan Bereen) is a rural locality (a selo) in Zaigrayevsky District, Republic of Buryatia, Russia. The population was 665 as of 2010. There are 8 streets.

== Geography ==
Staraya Bryan is located 35 km south of Zaigrayevo (the district's administrative centre) by road. Atkhatay is the nearest rural locality.
