= Mukhor-Tala =

Mukhor-Tala Мухор-Тала
- Selo
- Location within Republic of Buryatia Location within Russia
- Coordinates: 51°45′N 108°48′E
- Country: Russia
- Region: Republic of Buryatia
- District: Zaigrayevsky District
- Time zone: UTC+8:00

Mukhor-Tala (Russian: Мухор-Тала; Buryat: Мухар Тала, Mukhar Tala) is a rural locality (a selo) in Zaigrayevsky District, Republic of Buryatia, Russia. The population was 222 as of 2010. There are 4 streets.

== Geography ==
Mukhor-Tala is located 49 km southeast of Zaigrayevo (the district's administrative centre) by road. Novoilyinsk is the nearest rural locality.
