= Pervomayevka =

Pervomayevka Первомаевка
- Selo
- Location within Republic of Buryatia Location within Russia
- Coordinates: 52°01′N 108°24′E
- Country: Russia
- Region: Republic of Buryatia
- District: Zaigrayevsky District
- Time zone: UTC+8:00

Pervomayevka (Russian: Первомаевка) is a rural locality (a selo) in Zaigrayevsky District, Republic of Buryatia, Russia. The population was 807 as of 2010. There are 6 streets.

== Geography ==
Pervomayevka is located 30 km north of Zaigrayevo (the district's administrative centre) by road. Khara-Shibir is the nearest rural locality.
