= Chelutay (24 km) =

Chelutay (24 km) Челутай (24 км)
- Settlement
- Location within Republic of Buryatia Location within Russia
- Coordinates: 51°45′N 108°21′E
- Country: Russia
- Region: Republic of Buryatia
- District: Zaigrayevsky District
- Time zone: UTC+8:00

Chelutay (24 km) (Russian: Челутай (24 км); Buryat: Шулуута (24 км), Shuluuta (24 km)) is a rural locality (a settlement) in Zaigrayevsky District, Republic of Buryatia, Russia. The population was 1,053 as of 2010. There are 16 streets.

== Geography ==
Chelutay (24 km) is located 16 km southeast of Zaigrayevo (the district's administrative centre) by road. Chelutay is the nearest rural locality.
