= Tetiana Balahura =

Ukrainian language teacher

Hero of Ukraine Tetiana Balahura
- Тетяна Балагура
- Born: Tetiana Ivanivna Antonyuk; 12 January 1960 (age 66); Nadvirna, Ukrainian SSR, Soviet Union
- Education: Poltava V.G. Korolenko National Pedagogical University
- Occupation: Ukrainian language teacher
- Years active: 1980–present
- Awards: Hero of Ukraine

Tetiana Ivanivna Balahura (Ukrainian: Тетяна Іванівна Балагура; née Antonyuk; born 12 January 1960) is a Ukrainian language teacher. She began working as a teacher of the Ukrainian language and literature in 1980 and has been at the Poltava Lyceum No. 1 named after Ivan Kotliarevskyi since 2001. Balahura is the author of textbooks on the Ukrainian language, poems which have been printed, songs, scripts, more than 48 scientific works in magazines and newspapers, and has edited 29 poetry collections for students. She has served as the head of the Poltava City Methodical Association of Ukrainian Language and Literature Teachers and is the permanent head of the literary studio "Pereveslo", whose students have won multiple times at city-, regional- and international-level poetry and prose competitions. Balahura was conferred the title of Hero of Ukraine with the Order of the State by president Viktor Yushchenko in 2009.

== Biography ==
Balahura was born in the city of Nadvirna, Ivano-Frankivsk Oblast on 12 January 1960. She graduated from the No. 30 Gymnasium in the city of Poltava in 1977. Four years later, Balahura graduated from the Poltava National Pedagogical University with a diploma with honours. She began her career working as a teacher of the Ukrainian language and literature at Poltava's No. 32 educational complex No. 32 between 1980 and 2001. Balahura has worked as a teacher of the Ukrainian language and literature at the Poltava City Lyceum No. 1 named after I. P. Kotlyarevskyi since 2001.

She conducts creative searching, deep erudition and efficiency in her teaching material to her students. Balahura is a promoter of student's comprehensive development and attempts to create conditions for the full development of each student that she teaches. She uses artistic photographs and works closely with academically gifted students with fifteen taking prizes at the egional and All-Ukrainian competitions-defenses of scientific works in the line of the Small Academy of Sciences, seven of them winning prizes at the All-Ukrainian Olympiad in Ukrainian language and literature and four earning prizes at the Minor Academy of Sciences of Ukraine. Balahura encourages students to transition away from templates and onto a broad-minded view of the world. She has authored textbooks on the Ukrainian language, her own poems which have been printed in other books, songs, scripts, more than 48 scientific works in magazines and newspapers, and has edited 29 poetry collections for students.

Balahura has served as the head of the Poltava City Methodical Association of Ukrainian Language and Literature Teachers and is a member of the regional special research group of philology teachers. She is the permanent head of the literary studio "Pereveslo", whose students have won multiple times at city-level, regional-level and international-level poetry and prose competitions. Balahura has taken part in all-Ukrainian and international conferences on education, educational methods and creativity of Ukrainian writers and has served on the jury of city, regional and All-Ukrainian Olympiads and "Teacher of the Year" contests. She served as a confident of presidential candidate Yuriy Kostenko in Ukraine's 152nd electoral district in 2010, and unsuccessfully gained election to the Verkhovna Rada as a candidate for the Our Ukraine political party two years later after being registered 30th on the party's electoral list on the Central Election Commission.

== Awards ==
In 1988, she was awarded the Excellence in People's Education of the Ukrainian SSR. The following year, Balahura received the certificate of the Ministry of Education and Science of Ukraine and was also awarded certificates of the city and regional departments of education, a certificate of the Poltava Regional State Administration. She won the 1996 All-Ukrainian competition "Teacher of the Year" and the 1997 Laureate of the All-Ukrainian stage of the "Teacher of the Year" contest.

Balahura won the Poltava Regional Prize named after I.P. Kotlyarevskyi "for a significant contribution to the development and establishment of the Ukrainian language in society." In August 2009, president Viktor Yushchenko conferred her the title of Hero of Ukraine with the Order of the State "For a remarkable personal contribution to the development of national education, the introduction of innovative methods of teaching and upbringing of the young generation, and fruitful pedagogical activity". Balahura was given diplomas of the Poltava Regional State Administration, city and regional departments of education in 2011.
