= Shene-Busa =

Shene-Busa Шэнэ-Буса
- Ulus
- Location within Republic of Buryatia Location within Russia
- Coordinates: 51°44′N 108°30′E
- Country: Russia
- Region: Republic of Buryatia
- District: Zaigrayevsky District
- Time zone: UTC+8:00

Shene-Busa (Russian: Шэнэ-Буса; Buryat: Шэнэ Бууса, Shene Buusa) is a rural locality (an ulus) in Zaigrayevsky District, Republic of Buryatia, Russia. The population was 416 as of 2010. There are 4 streets.

== Geography ==
Shene-Busa is located 22 km southeast of Zaigrayevo (the district's administrative centre) by road. Ilka is the nearest rural locality.
