= Ust-Bryan =

Ust-Bryan Усть-Брянь
- Selo
- Location within Republic of Buryatia Location within Russia
- Coordinates: 51°56′N 108°08′E
- Country: Russia
- Region: Republic of Buryatia
- District: Zaigrayevsky District
- Time zone: UTC+8:00

Ust-Bryan (Russian: Усть-Брянь) is a rural locality (a selo) in Zaigrayevsky District, Republic of Buryatia, Russia. The population was 1,395 as of 2010. There are 22 streets.

== Geography ==
Ust-Bryan is located 19 km northwest of Zaigrayevo (the district's administrative centre) by road. Imeni Serova is the nearest rural locality.
