= Khara-Kutul =

Khara-Kutul Хара-Кутул
- Settlement
- Location within Republic of Buryatia Location within Russia
- Coordinates: 51°45′N 109°18′E
- Country: Russia
- Region: Republic of Buryatia
- District: Zaigrayevsky District
- Time zone: UTC+8:00

Khara-Kutul (Russian: Хара-Кутул; Buryat: Хара Хγтэл, Khara Khütel) is a rural locality (a settlement) in Zaigrayevsky District, Republic of Buryatia, Russia. The population was 181 as of 2010.

== Geography ==
Khara-Kutul is located 19 km northeast of Zaigrayevo (the district's administrative centre) by road. Tarbagatay is the nearest rural locality.
