= Khara-Shibir =

Khara-Shibir Хара-Шибирь
- Ulus
- Location within Republic of Buryatia Location within Russia
- Coordinates: 52°04′N 108°27′E
- Country: Russia
- Region: Republic of Buryatia
- District: Zaigrayevsky District
- Time zone: UTC+8:00

Khara-Shibir (Russian: Хара-Шибирь; Buryat: Хара Шэбэр, Khara Sheber) is a rural locality (an ulus) in Zaigrayevsky District, Republic of Buryatia, Russia. The population was 175 as of 2010. There is 1 street.

== Geography ==
Khara-Shibir is located 36 km northeast of Zaigrayevo (the district's administrative centre) by road. Pervomayevka is the nearest rural locality.
