= Novoilyinsk =

Novoilyinsk Новоильинск
- Selo
- Location within Republic of Buryatia Location within Russia
- Coordinates: 51°40′N 108°42′E
- Country: Russia
- Region: Republic of Buryatia
- District: Zaigrayevsky District
- Time zone: UTC+8:00

Novoilyinsk (Russian: Новоильинск) is a rural locality (a selo) in Zaigrayevsky District, Republic of Buryatia, Russia. The population was 4,700 as of 2010. There are 36 streets.

== Geography ==
Novoilyinsk is located 40 km southeast of Zaigrayevo (the district's administrative centre) by road. Tashelan is the nearest rural locality.
