= Tatarsky Klyuch =

Tatarsky Klyuch Татарский Ключ
- Settlement
- Location within Republic of Buryatia Location within Russia
- Coordinates: 51°41′N 108°23′E
- Country: Russia
- Region: Republic of Buryatia
- District: Zaigrayevsky District
- Time zone: UTC+8:00

Tatarsky Klyuch (Russian: Татарский Ключ) is a rural locality (a settlement) in Zaigrayevsky District, Republic of Buryatia, Russia. The population was 1,863 as of 2010. There are 15 streets.

== Geography ==
Tatarsky Klyuch is located 23 km southeast of Zaigrayevo (the district's administrative centre) by road. Ilka is the nearest rural locality.
