= Ilka, Republic of Buryatia =

Ilka Илька
- Selo
- Location within Republic of Buryatia Location within Russia
- Coordinates: 51°43′N 108°31′E
- Country: Russia
- Region: Republic of Buryatia
- District: Zaigrayevsky District
- Time zone: UTC+8:00

Ilka (Russian: Илька; Buryat: Элхи, Elkhi) is a rural locality (a selo) in Zaigrayevsky District, Republic of Buryatia, Russia. The population was 2,168 as of 2010. There are 17 streets.

== Geography ==
Ilka is located 25 km southeast of Zaigrayevo (the district's administrative centre) by road. Shene-Busa is the nearest rural locality.
