= Serhiy Shkarlet =

Ukrainian economist and politician

- Сергій Шкарлет
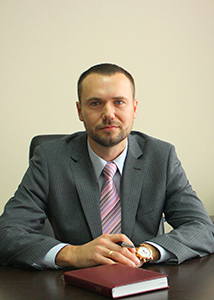
- Shkarlet in 2010

Minister of Education and Science
- In office 25 June 2020 – 20 March 2023
- President: Volodymyr Zelenskyy
- Prime Minister: Denys Shmyhal
- Preceded by: Lubomyra Mandziy (acting)
- Succeeded by: Oksen Lisovyi

Personal details
- Born: 19 October 1972 (age 53) Kokand, Uzbek SSR, Soviet Union (now Uzbekistan)
- Party: Independent
- Other political affiliations: Party of Regions; European Solidarity
- Education: Igor Sikorsky Kyiv Polytechnic Institute
- Occupation: Economist politician

Serhiy Mykolayovych Shkarlet (Ukrainian: Сергій Миколайович Шкарлет; born 19 October 1972) is a Ukrainian economist and politician. On 25 June 2020 he was assigned as acting Minister of Education and Science. On 17 December 2020, the Verkhovna Rada (Ukraine's national parliament) appointed Shkarlet as Minister of Education and Science. Parliament dismissed him 20 March 2023.

== Biography ==
Born in 1972 in Kokand, in the Uzbek Soviet Socialist Republic, Shkarlet's family moved to Nizhyn, in the Ukrainian Soviet Socialist Republic, in 1975 because his father was offered a job there in the defense specialist company Research and Production Complex "Progress". From 1989 until 1995, Shkarlet studied and graduated at Kyiv Polytechnic Institute. Between 1995 and 1997 he studied accounting and auditing at Chernihiv National University of Technology and in 1997 at the Academician Yuriy Bugay International Scientific and Technical University. In 1996 he started teaching at the Chernihiv National University of Technology.

Shkarlet is a Doctor of Economics, Professor (2008).

Since May 2010, he has served as rector of the Chernihiv State Technological University. In June 2020 Ukrainian media began to accuse Shkarlet of plagiarism in his scientific works.

From 2010 to 2015, he was a member of the Chernihiv Oblast Council for the Party of Regions. In 2020 Shkarlet claimed that he had joined the Party of Regions "by order from the regional state administration." Previously in 2010 he had claimed that "I fully share the views and principles of the Party of Regions." According to former fellow deputies in the Chernihiv Oblast Council Shkarlet had pro-European views.

In the 2015 Ukrainian local elections Shkarlet unsuccessfully sought re-election, this time on the party list of European Solidarity.

On 25 June 2020 Shkarlet was assigned as acting Minister of Education and Science. Beforehand, he had served as Deputy Minister of Education and Science for European Integration. Prior to Shkarlet's assignment as minister, significant volumes of plagiarism were discovered in his scientific publications.

On 17 December 2020, the Verkhovna Rada (Ukraine's national parliament) appointed Shkarlet as Minister of Education and Science. Voice claimed that two deputies voted for the appointment although they were not present in the Verkhovna Rada building (Shkarlet was appointed with exactly 226 votes, the required amount for an approval).

In 2020 Shkarlet was accused of plagiarism. The presence of plagiarism in Shkarlet's papers was confirmed by National Agency for Quality Assurance of Higher Education and by three independent international experts from the USA, the Czech Republic and Poland, who analyzed excerpts of works translated into English. Afterwards Skarlet filed a lawsuit against the National Agency for Quality Assurance of Higher Education to the District Administrative Court of the City of Kyiv, in which he demanded to "declare the actions of the defendant to be illegal in establishing the presence of textual borrowings without reference to the source" in a number of his scientific works. The court of first instance ruled in favor of the official.

Parliament dismissed Shkarlet as minister on 20 March 2023.

== See also ==
- Shmyhal Government
