= Novaya Bryan =

Novaya Bryan Новая Брянь
- Selo
- Location within Republic of Buryatia Location within Russia
- Coordinates: 51°42′N 108°15′E
- Country: Russia
- Region: Republic of Buryatia
- District: Zaigrayevsky District
- Time zone: UTC+8:00

Novaya Bryan (Russian: Новая Брянь; Buryat: Шэнэ Бэрээн, Shene Bereen) is a rural locality (a selo) in Zaigrayevsky District, Republic of Buryatia, Russia. The population was 4,643 as of 2010. There are 61 streets.

== Geography ==
Novaya Bryan is located 16 km south of Zaigrayevo (the district's administrative centre) by road. Chelutay (3 km) is the nearest rural locality.
