= Nizhniye Taltsy =

Nizhniye Taltsy Нижние Тальцы
- Settlement
- Location within Republic of Buryatia Location within Russia
- Coordinates: 51°53′N 107°54′E
- Country: Russia
- Region: Republic of Buryatia
- District: Zaigrayevsky District
- Time zone: UTC+8:00

Nizhniye Taltsy (Russian: Нижние Тальцы) is a rural locality (a settlement) in Zaigrayevsky District, Republic of Buryatia, Russia. The population was 1,491 as of 2010. There are 56 streets.

== Geography ==
Nizhniye Taltsy is located 33 km northwest of Zaigrayevo (the district's administrative centre) by road. Ozyorny is the nearest rural locality.
