= Lubomyra Mandziy =

Ukrainian educator and civil servant (1973–2021)

- Любомира Мандзій
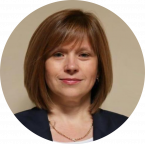

Acting Minister of Education and Science
- In office 25 March 2020 – 25 June 2020
- President: Volodymyr Zelenskyy
- Prime Minister: Denys Shmyhal
- Preceded by: Yuriy Polyukhovych
- Succeeded by: Serhiy Shkarlet

Personal details
- Born: 10 May 1973 Opaka, Ukrainian SSR, Soviet Union (now Ukraine)
- Died: 27 November 2021 (aged 48)
- Party: Independent
- Education: Ivan Franko National University of Lviv
- Occupation: Educator civil servant

Lubomyra Stepanivna Mandziy (Ukrainian: Любомира Степанівна Мандзій; 10 May 1973 – 27 November 2021) was a Ukrainian educator and civil servant. On 25 March 2020, she was appointed as acting Minister of Education and Science of Ukraine.

== Early life ==
Mandziy was born on 10 May 1973 in the village Opaka, Ukraine located in Drohobych Raion, Lviv Oblast, Ukrainian SSR. She graduated from geography faculty of the University of Lviv. From 1998 to 2001 she studied at the graduate school of the University of Lviv. In 2003, Mandziy became Candidate of Political Sciences. In 2008 she received the academic title of associate professor. From 2001 to 2016, she worked at the University of Lviv at the Department of Political Science.

== Career ==
In 2015, Mandziy ran for the Lviv Oblast Council in constituency number 8 for the party Petro Poroshenko Bloc. But she was not elected.

From 2016 to 2019, she headed the Department of Education and Science at the Lviv Oblast State Administration.

In September 2019, Mandziy was appointed Deputy Minister of Education and Science of Ukraine. On 25 March 2020, she was appointed the Acting Minister after the resignation of her predecessor Hanna Novosad. On 17 December 2020, parliament appointed Serhiy Shkarlet, as Minister of Education and Science.

== Personal life ==
Mandziy spoke English and was fluent in Polish. She was married to Taras Mandziy; the couple had a son who was named after his father Taras. She owned 50% of the shares of Lviv Plant of Reinforced Concrete Products №2, with her husband owning the other 50%.

Mandziy died on 27 November 2021, at the age of 48. Mandziy's Facebook page posted a message from her family stating that she "had been battling a serious illness for the past year and a half", but no cause of death was given.

== See also ==
- Shmyhal Government
