= Piano voting in Ukraine =

Ukrainian lawmakers voting on others' behalf

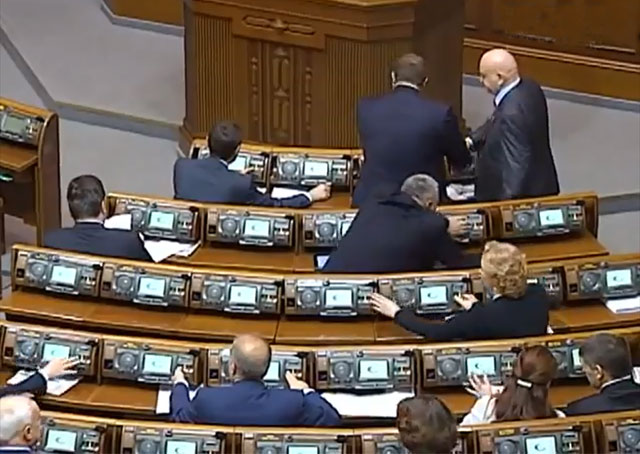
Verkhovna Rada deputies voting for absent colleagues for the 2013 budget

A button pusher (Ukrainian: кнопкодав, Knopkodav) is a member of the Verkhovna Rada of Ukraine (the parliament of Ukraine) who votes on a motion by using their own identity card as well as ones belonging to other deputies with or without their consent.

On 2 March 2021, pressure sensors installed on the voting machines within the Ukrainian parliament were activated. Intended to prevent members of parliament (MPs) from voting on behalf of their absent colleagues, the sensors ensure each voting machine requires the use of both hands.

== Etymology ==
The term "button pusher", originating in early 2000s journalism, refers to MPs who fraudulently vote on behalf of their colleagues.

Other names for this phenomenon are "vote in the dark", "truant voting", "multiple voting", "vote for himself and for the other guy", "piano voting", and "pianism".

== Description ==
If unable to attend parliament, a deputy still wishing to vote may lend their personal voting card to a colleague for the purpose of piano voting. Alternately, duplicate cards might be issued without the owner's knowledge.

The button pusher inserts the missing deputy's card for the e-voting system "Rada", without getting up from their seat, and either openly or secretly, potentially concealing their hand with a newspaper or magazine, votes on the absent deputy's machine.

If voting for multiple other deputies, the button pusher moves from one seat to the next with multiple voting cards and pushes the buttons the same way. One such button pusher was found to have voted on average for 9.8 missing persons. Often when an absolute majority of 226 deputies was required, button pushers were responsible for 35-40 votes.

Before the start of every session of the parliament, deputies have to register their signature and voting card The deputies should also register via the parliamentary electronic system at the session hall, and thus other people will be unable to register in place of deputies.

== History ==
Button pushing reached its peak in the 6th convocation (2007–2012) at the initiative and with the organizational support of leadership factions among the ruling majority, which was composed of the Party of Regions and the Communist Party of Ukraine. According to the NGO Chesno, 449/450 deputies were guilty of piano voting. Tactics were quick voting when the current favourable government decisions were to be taken quickly, with little to no discussion, often in the evening or at night by pressing of the team of "button pushers", about 35-40 MPs. The Party of Regions faction leadership would commit MPs to vote for other members. Before the vote, the responsible persons of the faction of the Party of Regions deputies dealt another card. Defending the practice, representatives of the ruling majority argued piano voting was simply "delegation of authority". The Party of Regions and the Communist Party of Ukraine opposed criminalizing piano voting.

In 2008 sensors were installed in the parliament through an initiative by then Chairman of the Verkhovna Rada Arseniy Yatsenyuk. They were designed to make it impossible for MPs to vote on behalf of absent colleagues. However, the sensors were found to be technically flawed and vulnerable to abuse, and did not remain in use .

A bill that would have implemented touch-sensitive keys to prevent piano voting failed in mid-March 2011, with only 222 of the 428 MPs registered in the session hall voting in favour.

On 6 December 2012 the Verkhovna Rada amended the Regulation (Article 37), which required MPs to register in person to attend meetings of Parliament, vote and vote in person. According to the law, before the opening of each session of Parliament shall be registered MPs' personally based identification and handwritten signatures. In the boardroom the deputy would be recorded through the e-voting system "Rada", so that would rule out the registration of another person in lieu of the deputy.

From the earliest days of the Verkhovna Rada at the 7th convocation (2012–2014), the opposition faction in the Verkhovna Rada, consisting of "Batkivshchyna", the Ukrainian Democratic Alliance for Reform (UDAR), VO "Svoboda", enacted a series of coordinated measures to combat button pushing by the Party of Regions faction.

On February 5, 2013, deputies from the opposition blocked the rostrum. A representative of UDAR attended the session wearing a sweater decorated with the phrase "Vote personally". Simultaneously the faction VO "Svoboda" submitted a bill that would criminalize voting on behalf of others in the legislature and punish violators with 5–8 years imprisonment.

Yuriy Odarchenko, a member of Batkivshchyna, filed a lawsuit against the Verkhovna Rada with the requirement for MPs to only enter their own personal votes, and cancel any previous resolutions which passed in violation of the regulations. Odarchenko called for the implementation of electronic voting in a way that would make it impossible for piano voting to continue by preventing a deputy from registering other deputies who may not be present and voting for them. He also demanded acts passed from December 13, 2012, to January 11, 2013, be ruled illegal and cancelled. The lawsuit was filed with the Supreme Administrative Court of Ukraine, on February 5, 2013.

In addition, the European Court of Human Rights in January 2013 made a decision in the case "Alexander Volkov v. Ukraine," in which the judge found that the voting system of the Verkhovna Rada was in violation of the established procedure outlined by the Council of Europe.

On 22 February 2013, procedural measures were implemented to prevent multiple voting. Voting for other deputies became prohibited by law. However, piano-voting remained pervasive. In July 2013 the de facto Chief Whip of the Party of Regions Mykhailo Chechetov defended the practise of piano voting, arguing "What matters is that decisions that the country needs get passed." (Note: Mykhailo Chechetov added to this (talking to reporters): "You go relax, girls, go and dance.")

After the 2014 Ukrainian revolution the new political climate demanded action against multi-voting. A tender was announced for a new parliamentary voting system, but no funding was ever allocated.

Volodymyr Zelenskyy’s victory in the 2019 Ukrainian presidential election and the 2019 Ukrainian parliamentary election renewed interest in piano voting. In December 2019, an initiative of the Servant of the People party made button pushing punishable by a fine of ₴3,000-5,000. According to Peter Dickinson of the Atlantic Council, the fine "failed to produce a flurry of prosecutions and had little discernible impact."

The first attempt to hold an MP legally accountable for "piano-voting" was announced by Prosecutor General of Ukraine Iryna Venediktova on 12 February 2021.

On 2 March 2021, the sensor technologies installed in 2008 were reactivated. The sensors made it impossible for MPs to vote on the behalf of absent colleagues since both hands were needed to submit a single vote. In order to cast their vote, an MP must activate the sensor with one hand whilst voting with the other, ensuring the sensor remains active for the entire duration of the voting period.

== Examples ==
Deputies have complained for years that despite being unable to participate in votes, parliament nonetheless registered votes attributed to them. In April 2011, a vote from deputy Mykola Lisin despite his death four days earlier. Rinat Akhmetov, a deputy for the Party of Regions from 2006-2012, was seen in the Verkhovna Rada building only once in the course of his five-year term. However, his voting card was used in hundreds of votes.

Numerous bills and measures were achieved with piano voting, including:

- Changes to the Constitution of Ukraine in 2004, including the date of presidential elections
- The Law of Ukraine "On measures to ensure the legislative reform of the pension system"
- The 2012 bill "On the Principles of State Language Policy" (Only 172 deputies actually voted, not 234, as officially announced)
- A new Criminal Procedural Code of Ukraine (adopted by 50 MPs instead of 226) in 2012
- Ihor Sorkin's 2013 appointment as governor of the National Bank of Ukraine
- In December 2020, Voice claimed that two deputies not present in the Verkhovna Rada building voted for the appointment of Serhiy Shkarlet as Minister of Education and Science; the proposal received exactly the 226 votes required

== Legal analysis of violations of the law ==
Article 84 of the Constitution of Ukraine requires parliamentary votes be submitted in person at Rada meetings.

The presence and direct participation in meetings of the deputy of the Verkhovna Rada of Ukraine is not optional. Paragraph three, Article 24 of the law "About the Status of the People's Deputy of Ukraine", requires deputies be present for meetings.

Use of the voting card of one MP by another for registration or electronic voting in parliament is illegal, as is the issuance of duplicate voting cards without the consent of the owner.

== See also ==
- People's Deputy of Ukraine
- Verkhovna Rada
- Party switching
