= Andrii Butenko =

Ukrainian politician (born 1978)

- Андрій Бутенко
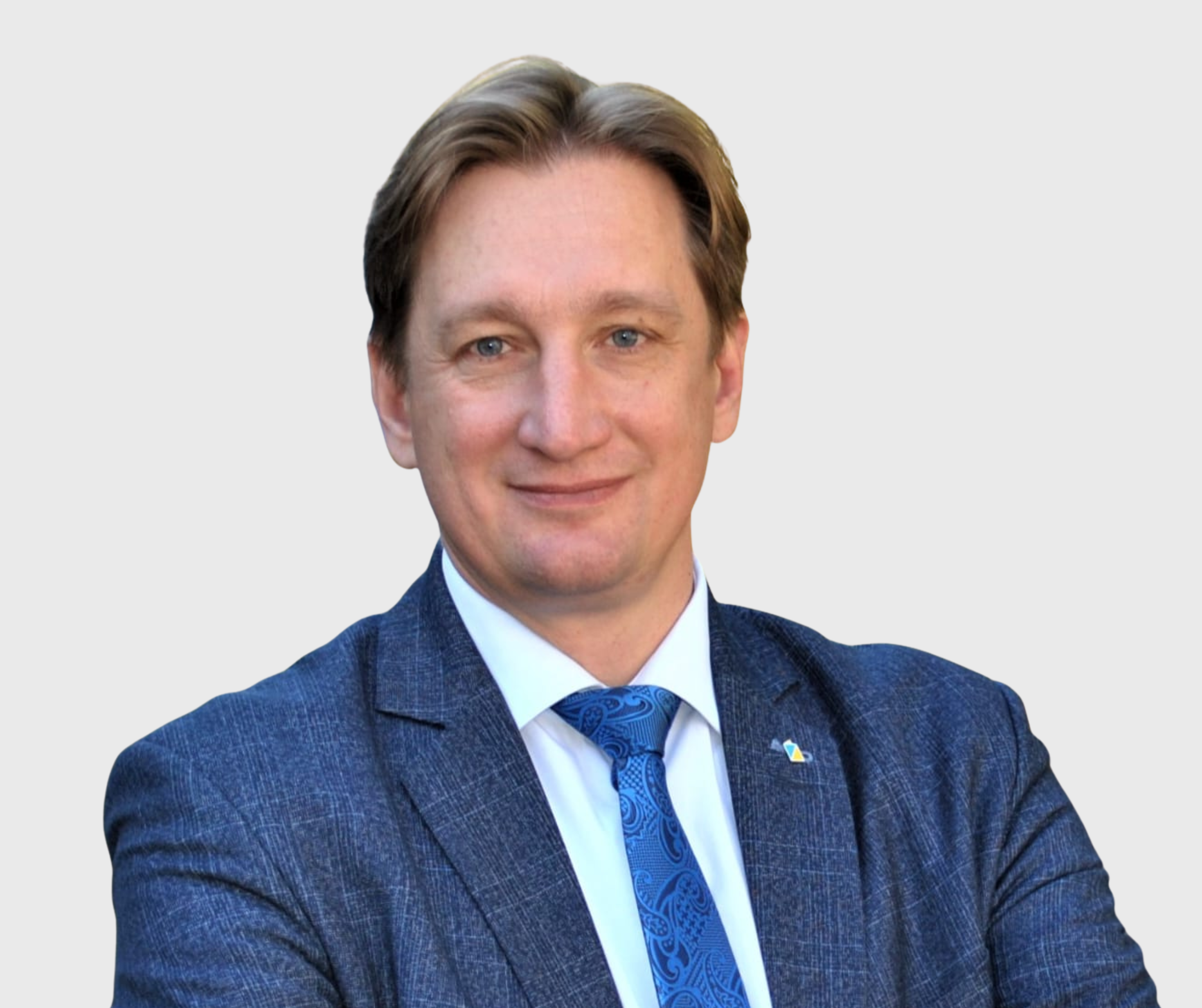
- Butenko in 2026

Minister of Education and Science
- Incumbent
- Assumed office 16 July 2026
- President: Volodymyr Zelenskyy
- Prime Minister: Serhii Koretskyi
- Preceded by: Oksen Lisovyi

Personal details
- Born: 10 November 1978 (age 47)
- Party: Independent
- Education: National Pedagogical Drahomanov University; Luhansk State University of Internal Affairs

Andrii Petrovych Butenko (Ukrainian: Андрій Петрович Бутенко; born 10 November 1978) is a Ukrainian politician serving as minister of education and science since 2026. From 2022 to 2026, he served as head of the National Agency for Quality Assurance in Higher Education.

== Biography ==
Butenko started his career as a car repairman in 1995, but later decided to work in the educational sphere. Between 1999 and 2003 he worked as a teacher of history and law at a school in Kyiv Oblast, and in 2001-2004 studied at the National Pedagogical Dragomanov University, graduating as a candidate of sciences. He also finished the Luhansk State University of Internal Affairs with a degree in law. For almost 16 years Butenko worked as a lecturer at the European University (Kyiv). In 2014 he underwent service in the Armed Forces of Ukraine.
