= Embassy of Ukraine, Lima =

Diplomatic mission of Ukraine in Peru

Embassy of Ukraine in Peru
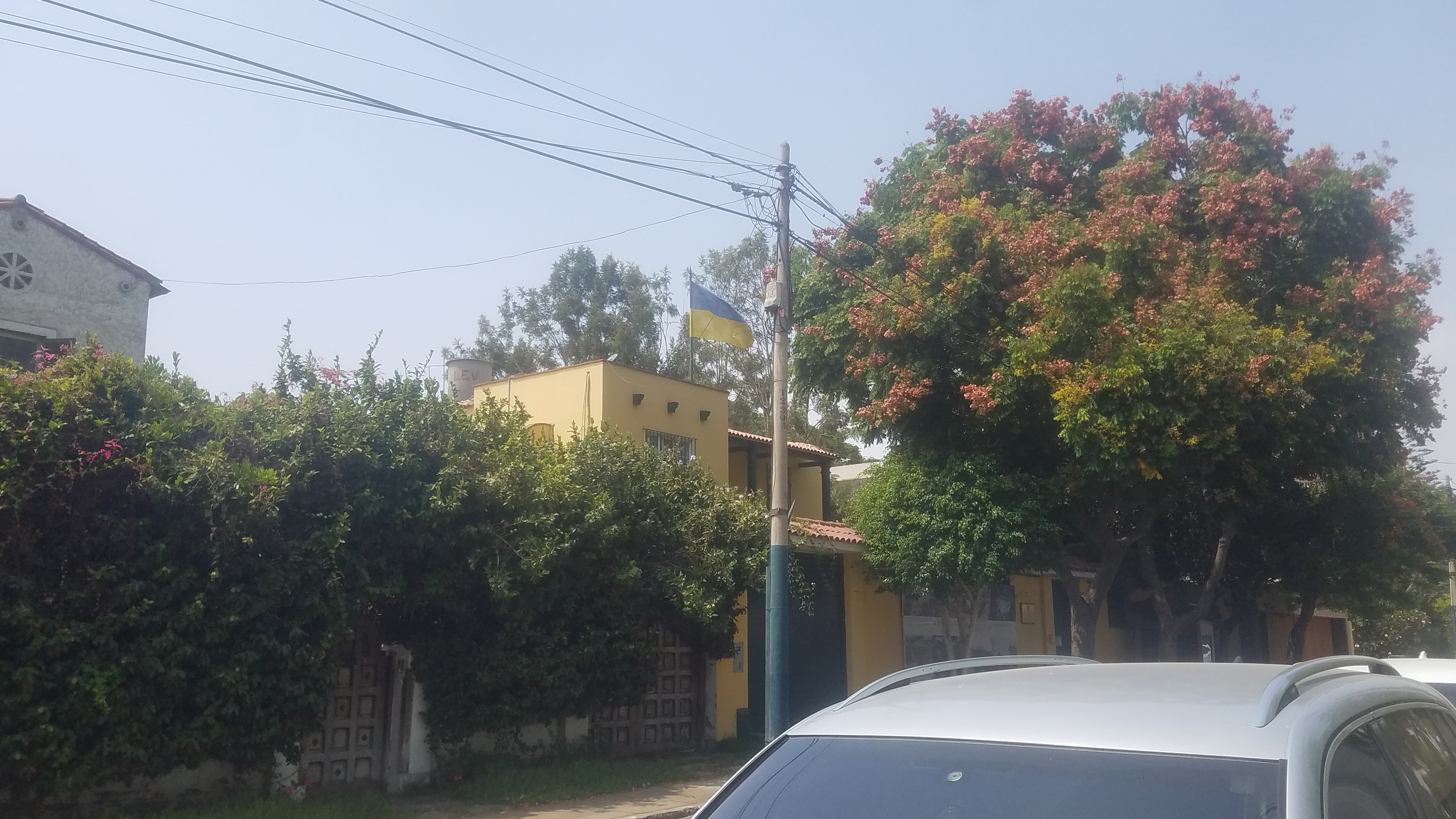
- The embassy in April 2023
- Location: San Isidro, Lima, Peru
- Address: Calle Juan Dellepiani № 470
- Opened: 2003
- Jurisdiction: Peru; Colombia; Ecuador
- Website: Official website

The Embassy of Ukraine in Lima represents the permanent diplomatic mission of Ukraine in Peru, also being accredited to Colombia and Ecuador. It is located at 256 Lizardo Alzamora Oeste Street, in El Rosario, a neighbourhood of San Isidro District, Lima.

The current ambassador of Ukraine to Peru is Yuriy Polyukhovych. He assumed the position in 2022.

== History ==
Peru recognized the independence of Ukraine on December 26, 1991. Diplomatic relations between the two countries were then established on May 7, 1992. The embassy was inaugurated in October 2003.

In 2022, messages of support were placed outside of the embassy by locals in response to the Russian invasion of Ukraine.

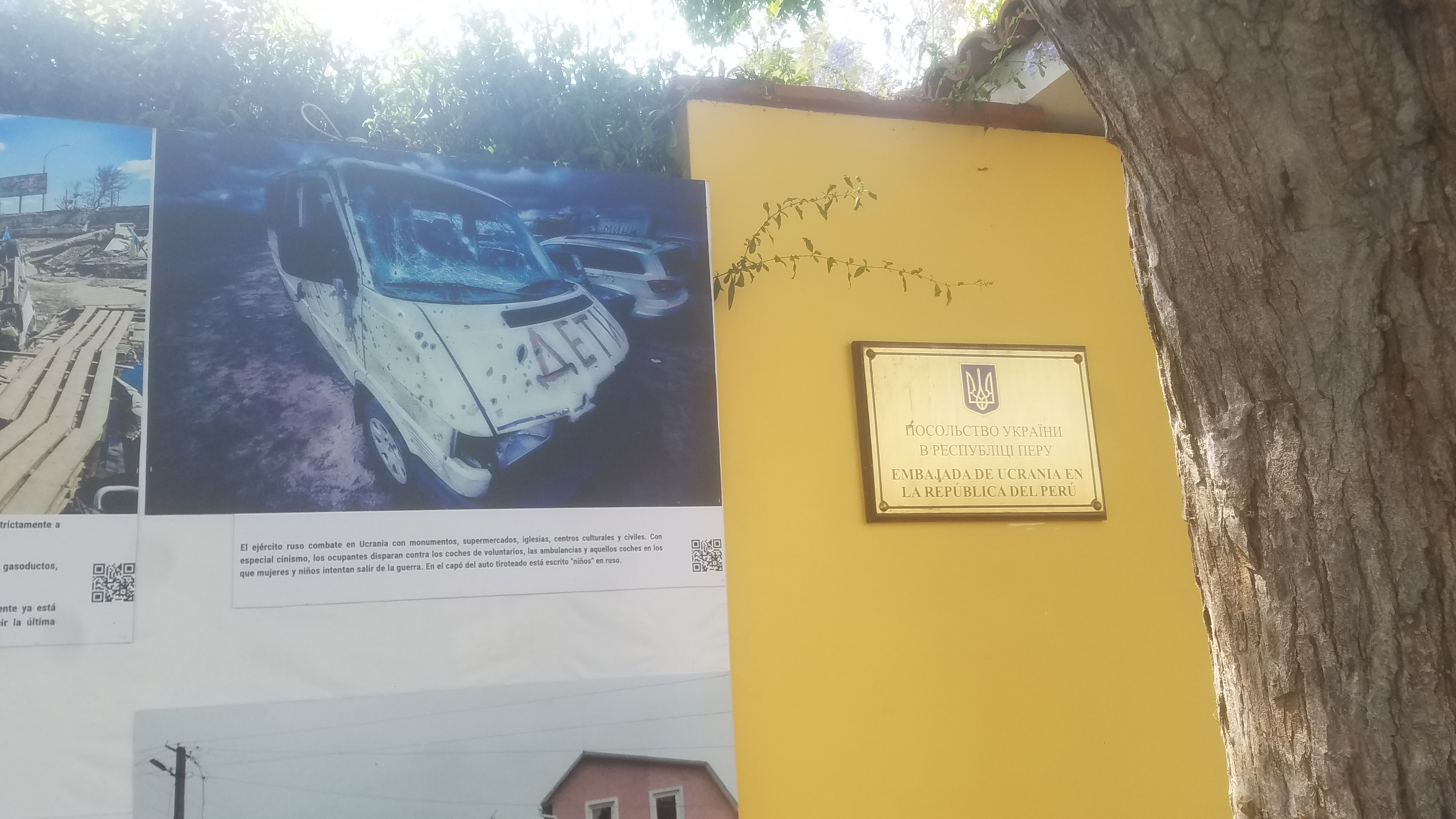
The entrance to the embassy, featuring a mural of the 2022 invasion

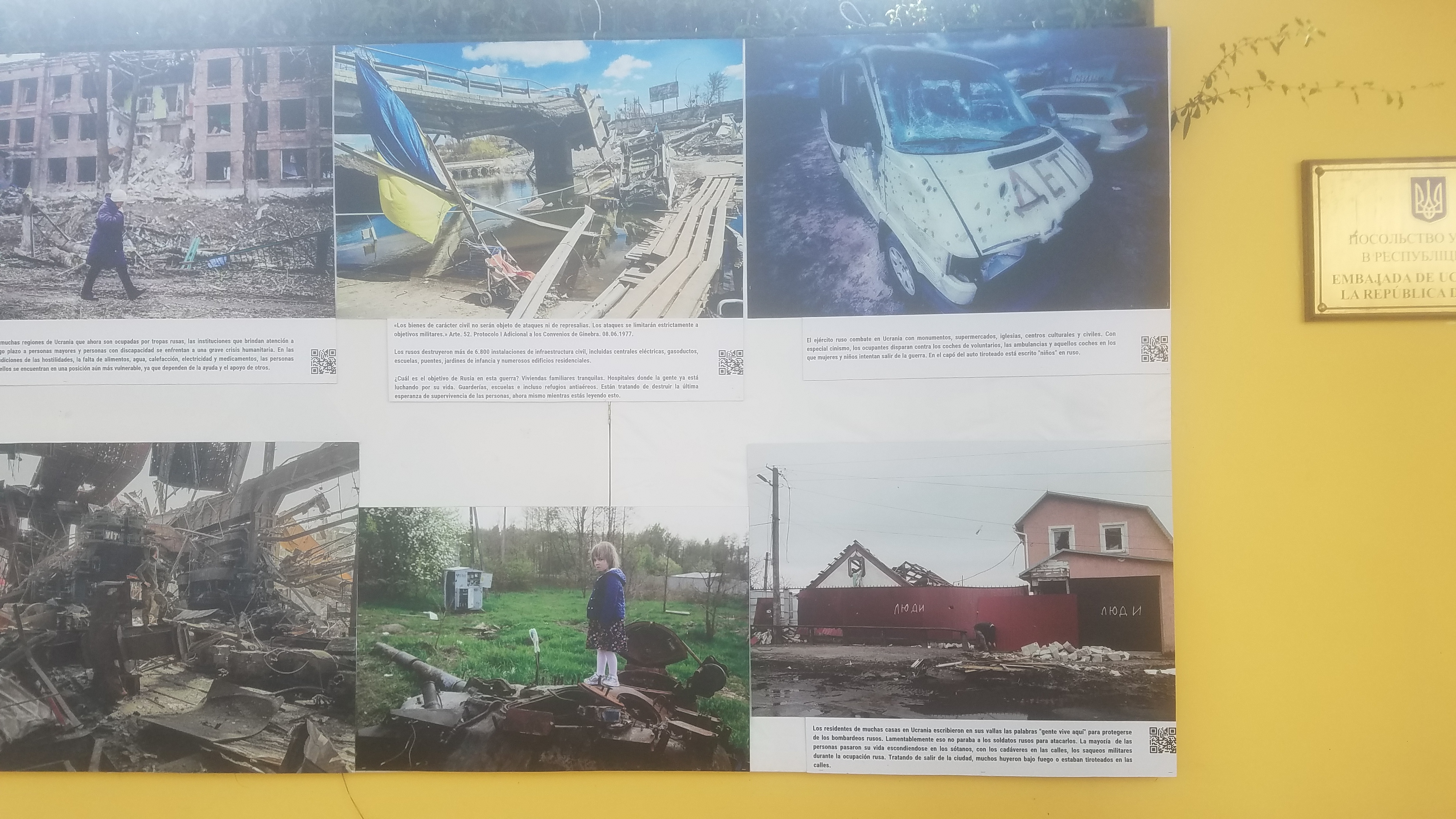
Ditto.

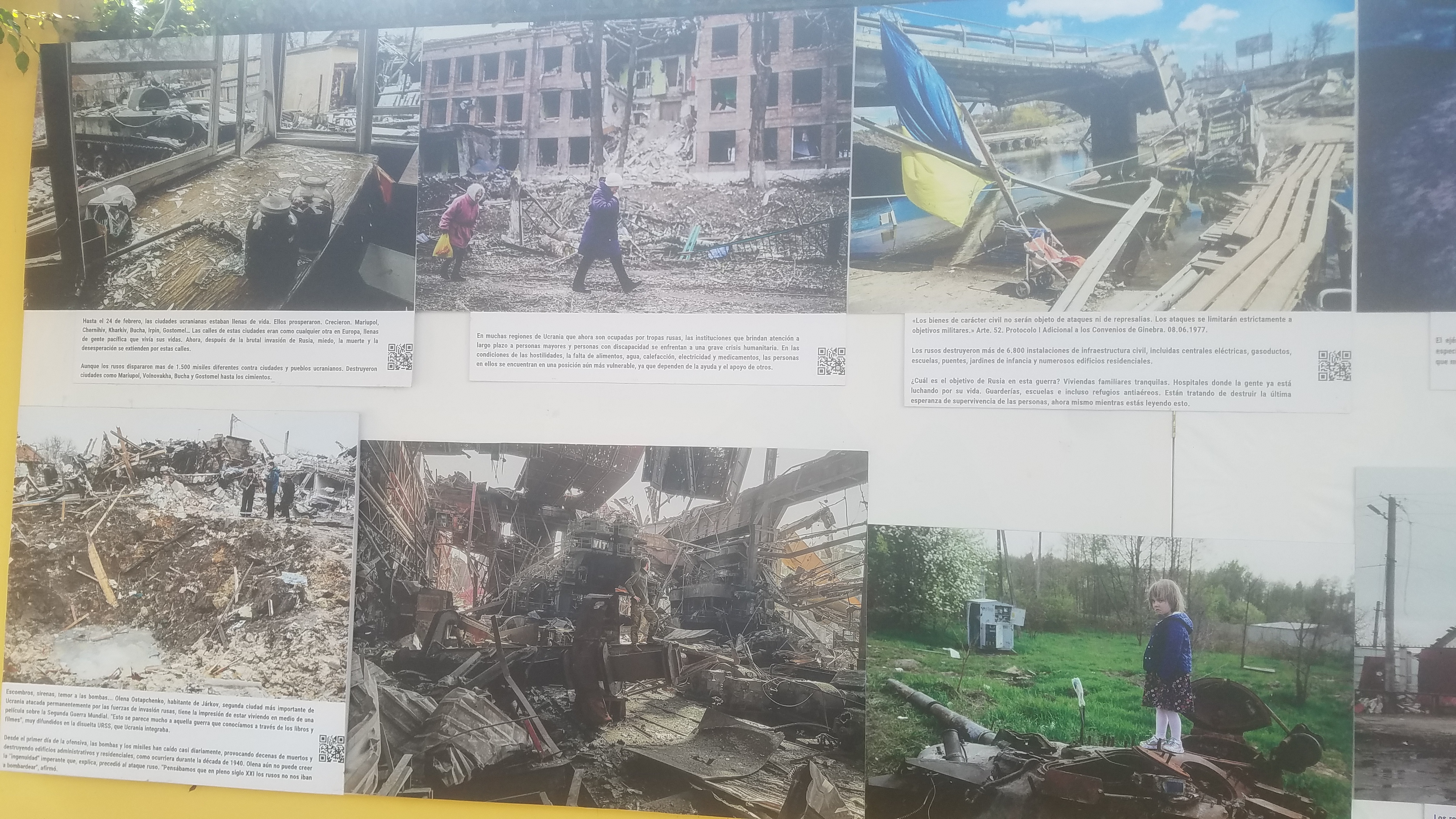
Ditto.

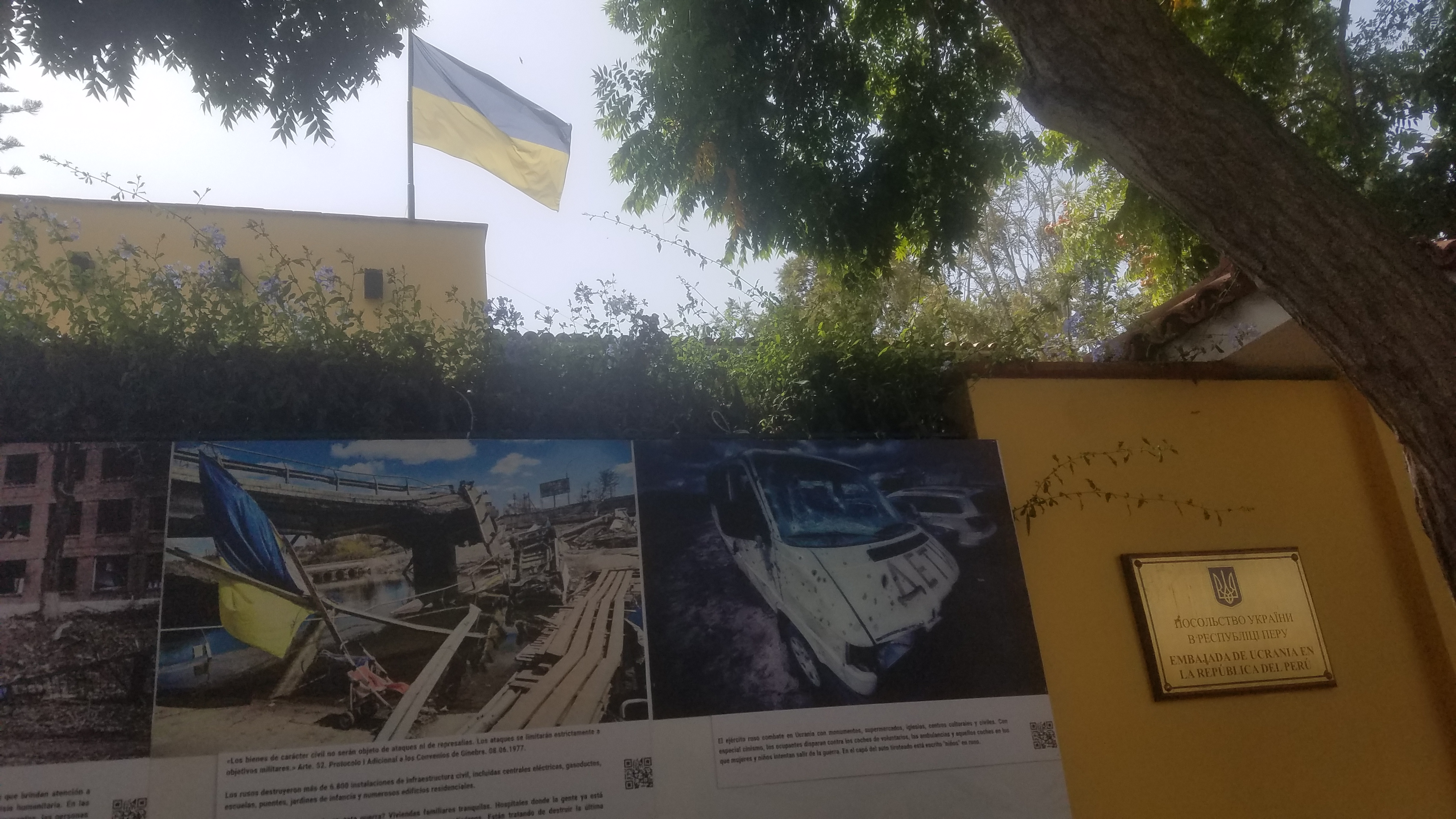
Ditto.

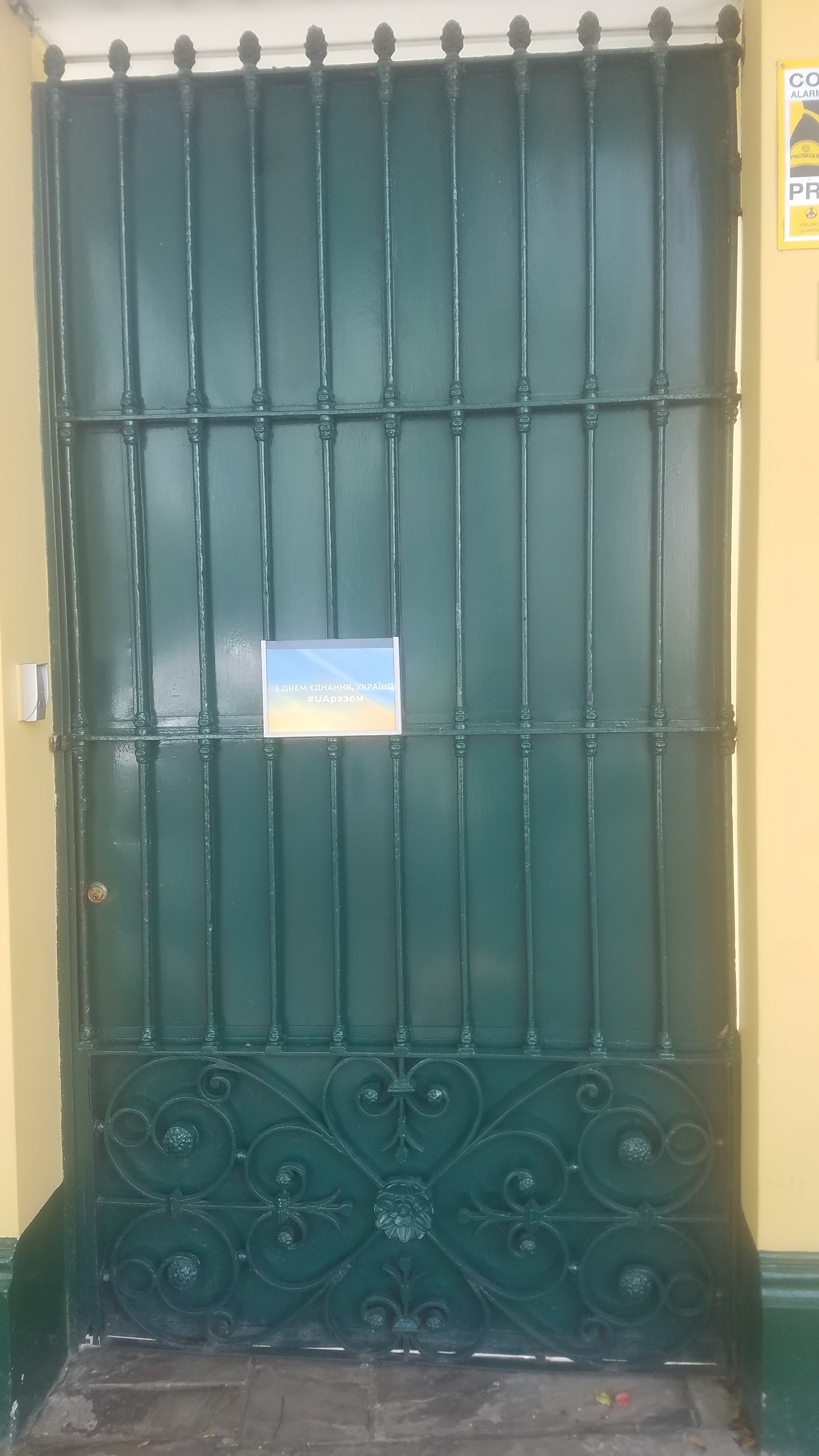
The door to the embassy. The text reads "Happy Unity Day, Ukrainian. #UAtogether".

== List of representatives ==
The Ambassador Extraordinary and Plenipotentiary of Ukraine to Peru (Ukrainian: Надзвичайний і Повноважний посол України в Перу) is the ambassador of Ukraine to Peru. The first ambassador assumed his post in 1999, the same year a Ukrainian embassy opened in Lima.

- 2003–2006 – Ihor Hrushko
- 2009–2013 – Viktor Kharaminsky (Charge d'Affairs)
- 2013–2017 – Oleksandr Mykhalchuk
- 2017–2018 – Vladyslav Bohorad (Charge d'Affairs)
- 2018–2020 – Ihor Tumasov
- 2020–2022 – Rostyslav Volodymyrovych Yavorivskyi (Charge d'Affairs)
- Since 2022 – Yuriy Polyukhovych

== See also ==
- List of diplomatic missions of Ukraine
- List of ambassadors of Peru to Ukraine
- Peru–Ukraine relations
