= Peru–Ukraine relations =

- Peru: Ukraine

Diplomatic mission
- None (Accredited from Warsaw): Embassy of Ukraine, Lima

Peru–Ukraine relations are the bilateral relations between Peru and Ukraine. Peru has an embassy in Warsaw accredited to Ukraine, having closed its embassy in Kyiv in 2006. Ukraine has an embassy in Lima. Both countries are members of the United Nations.

Peru has a small community of Ukrainians living mostly in Lima. Similarly, a small community of Peruvians live mostly in Kyiv, with a considerable number having been evacuated in 2022 due to the Russian invasion of Ukraine.

== History ==
During the Spanish American wars of independence, Miguel Rola (born Mykhailo Skybytskyi; Korchivka, 1793 — Starokostiantyniv, 1847), a Ukrainian soldier who had left Russia for his participation in the Decembrist revolt, fought under Simón Bolívar and participated in the Peruvian War of Independence, being wounded in action during the Battle of Ayacucho. After the battle, he travelled back to Lima to assist in the siege of the port of Callao. After returning to Russia in 1835, he was arrested and sent to Starokostiantyniv Prison, where he died in 1847.

Before Ukrainian independence, Peru maintained relations with its predecessors state, the Russian Empire and the Soviet Union. Peru officially recognised Ukraine as a sovereign state on December 26, 1991, and established relations on May 7, 1992.

In March 2003, Peruvian Foreign Minister, Allan Wagner, made a working trip to Ukraine; while his colleague, the State Secretary of Foreign Affairs of Ukraine, Volodymyr Yelchenko, made a working visit to Peru in April of the same year.

In 2000, an honorary consulate of Ukraine opened in Lima, while the embassy opened in 2003. In 2005, a Peruvian embassy was opened in Ukraine, closing one year later with the embassy in Poland becoming accredited instead. The final resident ambassador was

In 2007, Peru was the ninth country in the world and one of the first countries in Latin America to declare the Holodomor in Ukraine a genocide.

=== Russo-Ukrainian War ===
Peru was one of 100 countries that voted in favour of United Nations General Assembly (UNGA) Resolution 68/262, condemning the Russian annexation of Crimea. During the War in Donbas, Peru was the only Latin American country to offer humanitarian aid to Ukraine, doing so in 2015.

In 2022, the Peruvian Ministry of Foreign Affairs condemned Russia's invasion of Ukraine. Former chancellor Allan Wagner has been an outspoken critic of the invasion, opposing at the same time the rupture of relations with Russia. After Russia announced the annexation of four oblasts in Ukraine on September of the same year, Peru announced that it rejected the referendum and annexation. Peru again voted in favour of another resolution by the UNGA.

As of 2022, a number of Peruvian soldiers have been reported to have joined the Ukrainian International Legion.

In 2023, the Ukrainian community in Lima started organising weekly charity drives at Kennedy Park, the central park of the district of Miraflores.

== Bilateral treaties ==
Both countries have signed several economic, technological and other cooperation agreements. The Peruvian and Ukrainian armed forces have signed agreements on military cooperation, leading to the development of the Tifón 2a main battle tank in 2010.

In 2019, the State of Ukraine, through its Ukroboronprom corporation, was awarded a public tender for the sale of aircraft to the Peruvian state.

== High-level visits ==
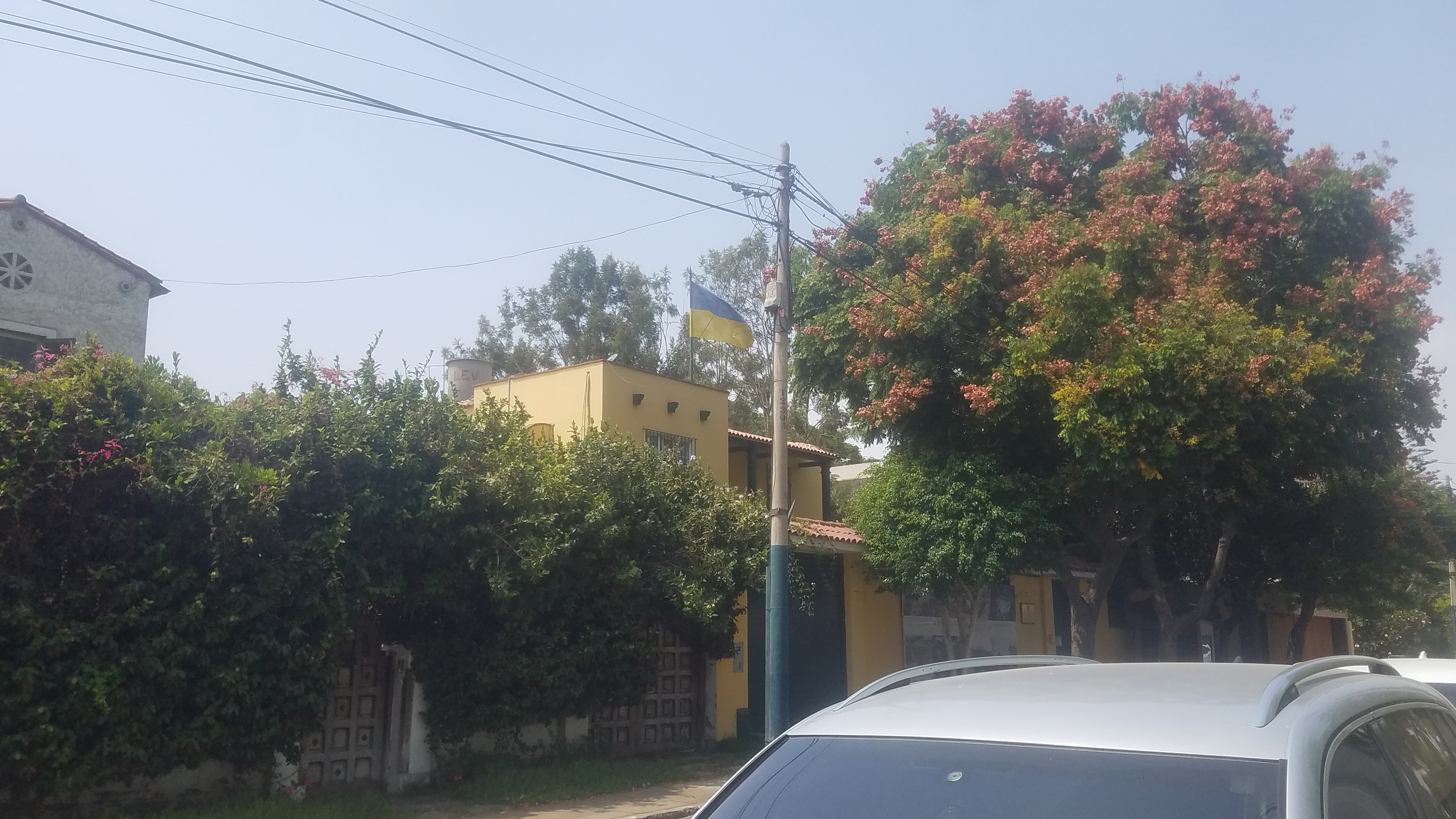
Embassy of Ukraine in Lima

High-level visit from Peru to Ukraine

- Foreign Minister Allan Wagner (2003)
- Foreign Minister Manuel Rodríguez Cuadros (2004)
- Mayor of Lima Luis Castañeda (2005)

High-level visit from Ukraine to Peru

- Foreign Minister Borys Tarasyuk (1999)
- First Viceminister Oleksandr Chalyi (2000)
- Secretary Volodymyr Yelchenko (2003)
- Mayor of Boryspil Anatoliy Fedorchuk (2007)
- Foreign Minister Kostyantyn Gryshchenko (2012)

== See also ==
- Foreign relations of Peru
- Foreign relations of Ukraine
- List of ambassadors of Ukraine to Peru
- List of ambassadors of Peru to Ukraine
- Foreign involvement in the Russian invasion of Ukraine
