= Hanna Novosad =

Ukrainian politician

- Ганна Новосад
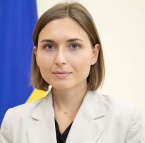

11th Minister of Education and Science of Ukraine
- In office 29 August 2019 – 4 March 2020
- President: Volodymyr Zelenskyy
- Prime Minister: Oleksiy Honcharuk
- Deputy: Maksym Strikha
- Preceded by: Liliya Hrynevych
- Succeeded by: Liubomyra Mandziy (Acting)

People's Deputy of Ukraine
- In office 29 August 2019 – 29 August 2019

Personal details
- Born: Hanna Ihorivna Novosad; 28 July 1990 (age 35) Ladyzhyn, Vinnytsia Oblast, Ukrainian SSR, Soviet Union
- Party: Servant of the People
- Education: Ukrainian Humanities Lyceum; National University of Kyiv-Mohyla Academy; Maastricht University
- Occupation: educational activist civil servant politician

Hanna Ihorivna Novosad (Ukrainian: Ганна Ігорівна Новосад; born 28 July 1990) is a Ukrainian educational activist, civil servant and politician. The Minister of Education and Science of Ukraine in the Honcharuk Government.

== Biography ==
Born on July 28, 1990, in Ladyzhyn, Vinnytsia region.

In 2007, she graduated from the Ukrainian Humanities Lyceum at the Taras Shevchenko National University of Kyiv. In 2011, Novosad received a bachelor's degree in political science from the National University of Kyiv-Mohyla Academy. In 2013, she received a master's degree in European studies from Maastricht University (the Netherlands). Novosad is fluent in English and German.

She is a Fellow of the Open Society Fund.

During 2012–2013, Novosad had internships in think tanks in Spain and the Czech Republic. Member of the Canada-Ukraine Parliamentary Program.

From 2014 to 2019, she worked at the Ministry of Education and Science of Ukraine. From March to November 2014, Novosad served as an advisor to the Minister of Education and Science Serhiy Kvit. Until December 2017, she headed the Department of International Cooperation and European Integration of the Ministry of Education and Science.

From December 2017 to August 2019, she was the Head of the Directorate of Strategic Planning and European Integration of the Ministry of Education and Science.

Novosad was a member of the Servant of the People political party. She was elected to the Verkhovna Rada in 2019.

From August 26, 2019, until March 4, 2020, she was the Minister of Education and Science of Ukraine.

== See also ==
- List of members of the parliament of Ukraine, 2019–24
