= Stary Onokhoy =

Stary Onokhoy Старый Онохой
- Selo
- Location within Republic of Buryatia Location within Russia
- Coordinates: 51°56′N 108°03′E
- Country: Russia
- Region: Republic of Buryatia
- District: Zaigrayevsky District
- Time zone: UTC+8:00

Stary Onokhoy (Russian: Старый Онохой; Buryat: Хуушан Онохой, Khuushan Onokhoi) is a rural locality (a selo) in Zaigrayevsky District, Republic of Buryatia, Russia. The population was 862 as of 2010. There are 10 streets.

== Geography ==
Stary Onokhoy is located 24 km northwest of Zaigrayevo (the district's administrative centre) by road. Onokhoy is the nearest rural locality.
