= Yuriy Polyukhovych =

Ukrainian historian and civil servant

- Юрій Полюхович
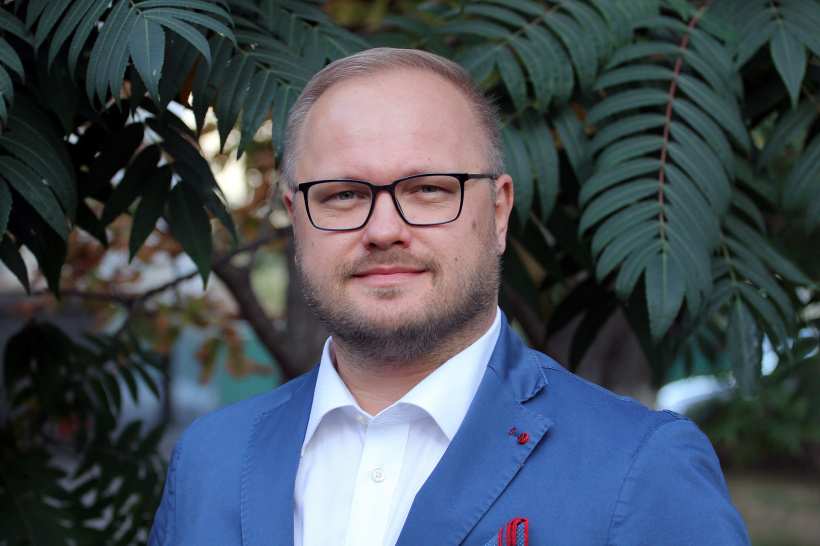
- Palyukhovych in 2019

Ukrainian Ambassador to Peru
- Incumbent
- Assumed office 23 December 2022
- President: Volodymyr Zelenskyy
- Prime Minister: Denys Shmyhal
- Preceded by: Rostyslav Yavorivskyi

Ukrainian Ambassador to Colombia
- Incumbent
- Assumed office 20 June 2023
- President: Volodymyr Zelenskyy
- Prime Minister: Denys Shmyhal
- Preceded by: Ihor Hrushko

Ukrainian Ambassador to Ecuador
- Incumbent
- Assumed office 5 July 2023
- President: Volodymyr Zelenskyy
- Prime Minister: Denys Shmyhal
- Preceded by: Ihor Hrushko

Personal details
- Born: 1 November 1980 (age 46) Kostopil, Ukrainian Soviet Socialist Republic, Soviet Union (now Ukraine)
- Education: National University of Kyiv-Mohyla Academy
- Occupation: Diplomat; Historian; Mayanist scholar Public figure

Yuriy Yuriyovych Polyukhovych (Ukrainian: Юрій Юрійович Полюхович; born 1 November 1980) is a Ukrainian diplomat, historian and civil servant. Ukrainian Mayanist researcher, historian, public and political activist, PhD in history, acting Minister of Education and Science of Ukraine from 10 to 25 March 2020. Ambassador of Ukraine to Peru (since 23 December 2022), and to Colombia (since 20 June 2023) and Ecuador (since 5 July 2023) concurrently. Honorary Academician of the Latin American Academy of Military History (since 2024).

== Biography ==
He received a Master's degree in History from the National University of Kyiv-Mohyla Academy. Polyukhovych is a Candidate of Historical Sciences.

Since 2000, he represents Ukraine at the European Association of Mayanists.

From 2014 to 2016, he was an adviser to the Minister of Education and Science.

Since 2017, he is the head of the Ukrainian Science Research Foundation.

In September 2019, Polyukhovych was appointed First Deputy Minister of Education and Science.

On 10 March 2020, he was appointed as the Acting Minister of Education and Science.

On 23 December 2022, he was appointed as Ambassador Extraordinary and Plenipotentiary of Ukraine to the Republic of Peru.

On 20 June 2023, he was appointed by the President of Ukraine as Ambassador Extraordinary and Plenipotentiary of Ukraine to Colombia.

On 5 July 2023, he was appointed by the President of Ukraine as Ambassador Extraordinary and Plenipotentiary of Ukraine to Ecuador.

== See also ==
- Embassy of Ukraine in the Republic of Peru
