= Todogto =

Todogto Тодогто
- Selo
- Location within Republic of Buryatia Location within Russia
- Coordinates: 51°50′N 108°02′E
- Country: Russia
- Region: Republic of Buryatia
- District: Zaigrayevsky District
- Time zone: UTC+8:00

Todogto (Russian: Тодогто; Buryat: Тоодогто, Toodogto) is a rural locality (a selo) in Zaigrayevsky District, Republic of Buryatia, Russia. The population was 112 as of 2010. There are 2 streets.

== Geography ==
Todogto is located 32 km northwest of Zaigrayevo (the district's administrative centre) by road. Onokhoy is the nearest rural locality.
