= Alla Bondar =

Soviet-Ukrainian politician (1921–1981)

Alla Grigorievna Bondar (1921–1981) was a Soviet-Ukrainian politician (Communist).

She served as Minister of Education and Science 1962–1967.
