= Onokhoy-Shibir =

Onokhoy-Shibir Онохой-Шибирь
- Selo
- Location within Republic of Buryatia Location within Russia
- Coordinates: 51°58′N 108°00′E
- Country: Russia
- Region: Republic of Buryatia
- District: Zaigrayevsky District
- Time zone: UTC+8:00

Onokhoy-Shibir (Russian: Онохой-Шибирь; Buryat: Онохой Шэбэр, Onokhoi Sheber) is a rural locality (a selo) in Zaigrayevsky District, Republic of Buryatia, Russia. The population was 105 as of 2010. There are 3 streets.

== Geography ==
Onokhoy-Shibir is located 30 km northwest of Zaigrayevo (the district's administrative centre) by road. Stary Onokhoy is the nearest rural locality.
