= Junior Academy of Sciences of Ukraine =

The Junior Academy of Sciences of Ukraine (Ukrainian: Мала Академія Наук України, Mala Akademiya Nauk Ukrainy) is a governmental organization concerned with extracurricular science teaching. It is an integrated, multilevel system that has been instituted to identify children with special scientific talents. The Junior Academy of Sciences is subordinate to the National Academy of Sciences and the Ministry of Education and Science of Ukraine. It arose from the local network of pioneer palaces.

== Goals ==
The academy was created

- to provide mental, intellectual, creative development of school youth,
- to create conditions for social and vocational orientation, and
- to exploit the nation's intellectual potential.

== Tasks ==
The main tasks of the Junior Academy of Sciences are

- the realization of state policy concerning work with gifted school youth;
- the recognition, development and social support of gifted, bright and talented children;
- the involvement of intellectually and creatively gifted children in scientific, research, experimental and creative activities;
- the serving of the school youth needs in vocational orientation and creative self-realization according to their interests and abilities;
- the extension and systematization of pupils’ knowledge in different areas of science, and the formation of abilities, skills and culture of scientific research;
- the implementation of contemporary methods and methodic of studying into educational process of general and extracurricular educational institutions, oriented on pupils’ research activity;
- the study, generalization and expansion of the best pedagogical experience of working with gifted children and youth;and
- the organization of social support for talented educators.

== Structure ==
Junior Academy of Sciences of Ukraine unites 27 regional territorial departments which coordinate activities of district and city local departments and pupils’ scientific societies.

General coordination of the local departments’ activity is run by the National Centre “Junior Academy of Sciences of Ukraine”

Supreme governing body of JAoS is Presidium, members of which are outstanding scientists of our country – country leaders in their research field.

== Presidium ==
President – Oleksiy Dovgyy
Vice-President – Viktor Baryakhtar
Vice-President - Viktor Andrushchenko
Head of Chemistry and Biology Department – Valeriy Kukhar
Head of Philology and Art Studies Department – Mykola Zhulynskyy
Head of Computer Science and Programming Department – Volodymyr Red’ko
Head of Physics and Mathematics Department – Anatoliy Samoylenko
Member of Presidium – Valeriy Heyets′
Member of Presidium – Dmytro Melnychuk
Member of Presidium – Viktor Grinchenko

== Educational directions ==
On the basis of Junior Academy of Sciences around 7 thousand scientific groups and sections in different areas, with over 200 thousand senior pupils are involved annually into scientific and research activity.
Scientific areas:

Science and technology

- 287 groups
- 3136 students
- Including 1009 students from rural areas

Computer science and programming

- 760 groups
- 9065 students
- Including 1690 students from rural area

Physics and mathematics

- 1312 groups
- 16220 students
- Including 4691 students from rural area

History and Geography

- 1636 groups
- 17489 students
- Including 7136 students from rural area

Chemistry and Biology

- 1360 groups
- 17621 students
- Including 6826 students from rural area

Philology and Art Studies

- 1633 groups
- 19257 students
- Including 5824 students from rural area

Assistance to young scientists and their scientific research is provided by over 6,5 thousand pedagogues and scientists from educational establishments and institutions, among which:

56,60% General educational institution teachers
28% University teachers
15,40% Extracurricular institution teachers

Activity of Junior Academy of Sciences consists of 10 scientific departments which include 56 sections in almost all scientific areas, that promotes recognition of the most talented and gifted youth of our young state and develops scientific potential of the country.

Among students of Junior Academy of Ukraine, there are quite a few gifted children, whose achievements are honored by medals, gratuities, charters, diplomas of Ministry of Education and Science of Ukraine, scholarships from President of Ukraine and prestige international awards.
