= National Agency for Quality Assurance in Higher Education =

The National Agency for Higher Education Quality Assurance (Ukrainian: Національне агентство із забезпечення якості вищої освіти, НАЗЯВО, abbr. NAQA) is an independent permanent collegial body. It was created to implement the Law of Ukraine "On Higher Education" in the education quality assurance system and operates within the framework of ESG-2015 standards and recommendations, which, in turn, became part of the EU Association Agreement. NAQA acts on the basis of the Charter

== History ==
The Agency was established in 2015. The Agency consists of 23 members and is formed on a quota basis (no more than one person from the field of knowledge): three representatives of all-Ukrainian associations of employers' organizations; two from the number of first- or second-level higher education graduates; at least one representative from the following organisations: National Academy of Sciences of Ukraine; National Branch Academy of Sciences; state-owned institutions of higher education; institutions of higher education under communal ownership, institutions of higher education under private ownership.

== Personalities ==
- Sergiy Kurbatov
- Inna Sovsun

== Sources ==
- Ukraine Higher Education Leadership Development Programme
