= Ministry of Education and Science of Ukraine =

Government ministry of Ukraine

Coordinates: 50.44877°N 30.48544°E

- Міністерство освіти і науки

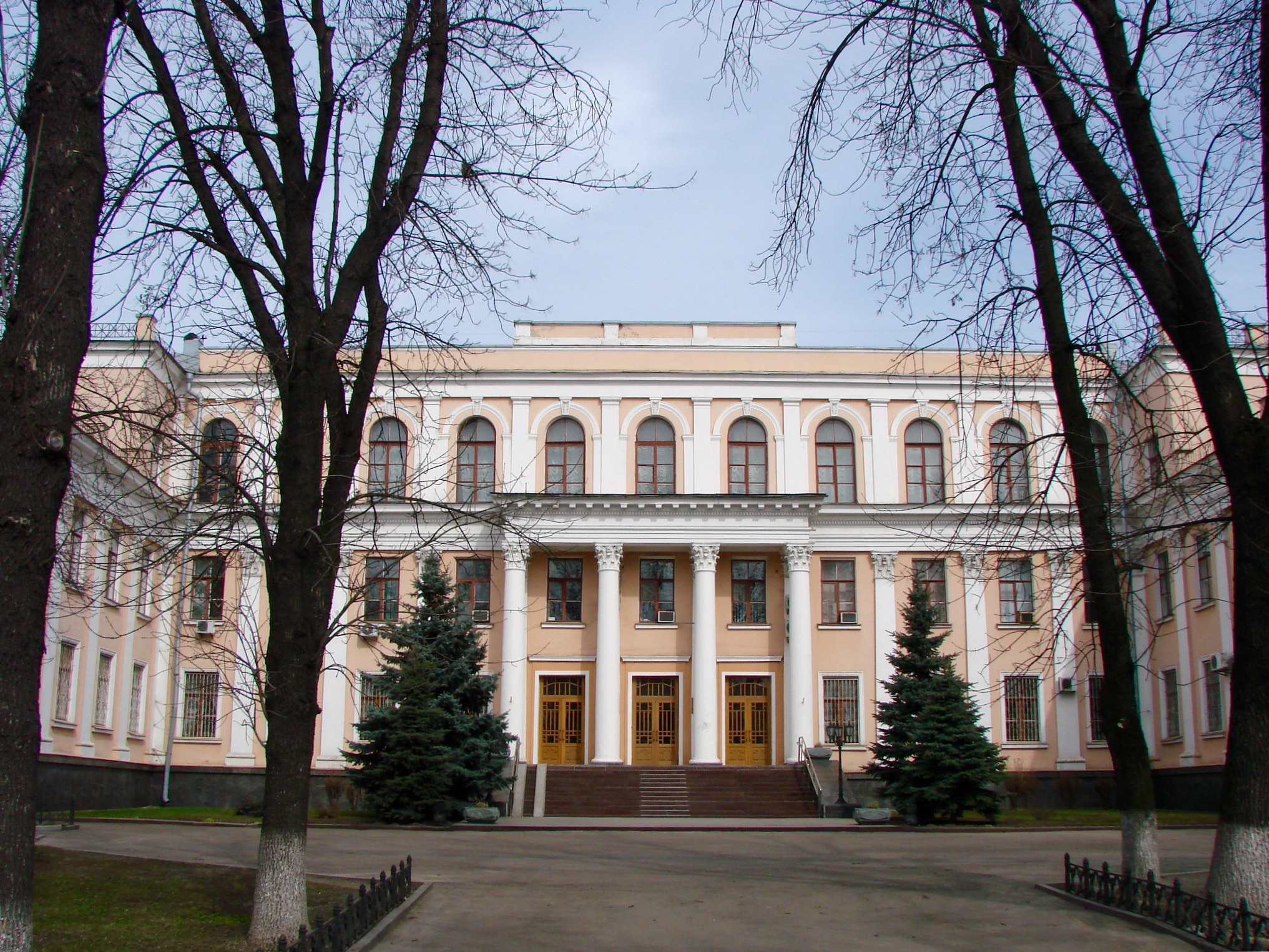
- Ministry headquarters in Kyiv

Agency overview
- Formed: December 12, 1991
- Preceding agency: Ministry of Education and Science, Youth and Sports
- Jurisdiction: Government of Ukraine
- Headquarters: 10 Beresteiskyi Avenue, Kyiv
- Minister responsible: Andrii Butenko
- Child agency: Service for intellectual property
- Website: mon.gov.ua

The Ministry of Education and Science of Ukraine (Ukrainian: Міністерство освіти і науки України, romanized: Ministerstvo osvity i nauky Ukrainy) is the main body in the system of central bodies of the executive power of Ukraine.

== History ==
On 28 June 1917 Ivan Steshenko was appointed Secretary of Education in the First Vynnychenko government of the Ukrainian People's Republic. The 1921 Treaty of Riga formerly ended the existence of the Ukrainian People's Republic as its former territory became part of Poland and the Soviet Union.

The modern Ministry of Education was created on 8 July 1992 by merging two major organs of the Ukrainian SSR: the Ministry of Higher and Middle Specialized Education and State Committee on Vocational-Technical Education. In 1991 there were two ministries of education — National and Higher (formerly Higher and Middle Specialized).

From 9 December 2010 until 28 February 2013 the Ministry of Education and Science (at the time led by Dmytro Tabachnyk) was merged with the Ministry of Youth and Sports.

On 28 February 2013 President Viktor Yanukovych reorganized the Ministry of Education and Science, Youth and Sports and the State Service for Youth and Sports, creating the Ministry of Education and Science of Ukraine and the Ministry of Youth and Sports.

== Structure ==
The ministry consists of the central body headed by the minister, first deputy, and other deputies to assist the minister. Part of ministry elects several state administrations representatives that are specialized in certain field and coordinate operation of government companies.

=== State agencies ===
- State Service for intellectual property of Ukraine

=== Former agencies ===
- Ministry of Education and Science, Youth and Sports of Ukraine (dissolved) (2010–2013)
- State Agency of Science, Innovations, and Informativeness of Ukraine

== List of ministers ==
=== Ukrainian People's Republic (1917-1918) ===
Title	Name of minister	Term of office	
Title	Name of minister	Start	End
General Secretary of Educational Affairs	Ivan Steshenko	15 June 1917	11 January 1918
Minister of Education	Ivan Steshenko	11 January 1918	18 January 1918
Minister of Education	Nykyfor Hryhoriiv	18 January 1918	29 January 1918
Minister of Education	Pavlo Khrystiuk	29 January 1918	10 March 1918
Minister of Education	Viacheslav Prokopovych	10 March 1918	2 May 1918

=== Ukrainian State (1918) ===
Title	Name of minister	Term of office	
Title	Name of minister	Start	End
Minister of Science and Arts	Mykola Vasylenko	3 May 1918	25 October 1918
Minister of Science and Arts	Petro Stebnytsky	24 October 1918	14 November 1918
Minister of Science and Arts	Volodymyr Naumenko	14 November 1918	14 December 1918

=== West Ukrainian People's Republic ===
Title	Name of minister	Term of office	
Title	Name of minister	Start	End
State Secretary of Education and Religion	Oleksander Barvinsky	9 November 1918	4 January 1919

=== Ukrainian People's Republic (Directorate) ===
Title	Name of minister	Term of office	
Title	Name of minister	Start	End
Head of the Department of Education	Yukhym Shchyrytsia	5 December 1918	26 December 1918
Minister of Education	Petro Kholodnyi	26 December 1918	2 January 1919
Minister of Education	Ivan Ohienko	5 January 1919	9 April 1919
Minister of Education	Antin Krushelnytskyi	27 April 1919	25 July 1919
Minister of Education	vacant		
Minister of Education	Petro Kholodnyi	26 May 1920	late 1920

=== Ukrainian Socialist Soviet Republic (1919-1946) ===
Name of Ministry	Name of minister	Term of office	
Name of Ministry	Name of minister	Start	End
People's Commissariat for Popular Education	Volodymyr Zatonsky	8 January 1919	May 1919
People's Commissariat for Popular Education	Hnat Mykhailychenko	12 May 1919	3 July 1919
People's Commissariat for Popular Education	Mykhailo Panchenko	3 July 1919	10 July 1919
People's Commissariat for Popular Education	Oleksandr Shumsky	10 July 1919	August 1919
People's Commissariat for Popular Education	vacant		
People's Commissariat for Popular Education	Volodymyr Zatonsky	December 1919	20 April 1920
People's Commissariat for Popular Education	Hryhoriy Hrynko	16 February 1920	20 September 1923
People's Commissariat for Popular Education	Volodymyr Zatonsky	30 October 1922	14 March 1924
People's Commissariat for Popular Education	Oleksandr Shumsky	29 September 1924	2 February 1927
People's Commissariat for Popular Education	Mykola Skrypnyk	7 March 1927	22 February 1933
People's Commissariat for Popular Education	Volodymyr Zatonsky	22 February 1933	22 December 1937
People's Commissariat for Popular Education	Hryhoriy Khomenko	5 May 1938	19 December 1938
People's Commissariat for Popular Education	Fedir Redko	2 April 1939	28 May 1940
People's Commissariat for Popular Education	Serhiy Bukhalo	28 May 1940	5 March 1943
People's Commissariat for Popular Education	Pavlo Tychyna	5 March 1943	15 March 1946

=== Ukrainian State (1941) ===
Title	Name of minister	Term of office	
Title	Name of minister	Start	End
Minister of Education and Creed	Volodymyr Radzykevych	July 1941	

=== Ukrainian Socialist Soviet Republic (1946-1991) ===
Name of Ministry	Name of minister	Term of office	
Name of Ministry	Name of minister	Start	End
Ministry of Popular Education	Pavlo Tychyna	15 March 1946	8 August 1948
Ministry of Popular Education	Mykola Savchuk	18 August 1948	23 August 1949
Ministry of Popular Education	Hryhoriy Pinchuk	23 August 1949	18 February 1957
Ministry of Popular Education	Ivan Bilodid	18 February 1957	20 April 1962
Ministry of Popular Education	Alla Bondar	22 April 1962	3 January 1967
Ministry of Popular Education	Petro Udovychenko	21 January 1967	2 March 1971
Ministry of Popular Education	Oleksandr Marynych	2 March 1971	3 July 1979
Ministry of Popular Education	Mykhailo Fomenko	3 July 1979	3 August 1990

=== Ukraine (since 1991) ===
Name of Ministry	Name of minister	Term of office	
Name of Ministry	Name of minister	Start	End
Ministry of National Education	Ivan Zyazyun	3 August 1990	May 1992
Ministry of Education	Petro Talanchuk	February 1992	6 July 1994
Ministry of Education	Mykhailo Zghurovskyi	18 November 1994	14 January 1999
Ministry of Education	Valentyn Zaichuk	1999	1999
Ministry of Education and Science	Vasyl Kremen	30 December 1999	3 February 2005
Ministry of Education and Science	Stanislav Nikolayenko	February 2005	18 December 2007
Ministry of Education and Science	Ivan Vakarchuk	18 December 2007	11 March 2010
Ministry of Education and Science, Youth and Sports	Dmytro Tabachnyk	11 March 2010	23 February 2014
Ministry of Education and Science	Serhiy Kvit	27 February 2014	14 April 2016
Ministry of Education and Science	Liliya Hrynevych	14 April 2016	29 August 2019
Ministry of Education and Science	Hanna Novosad	29 August 2019	4 March 2020
Ministry of Education and Science	Liubomyra Mandziy (Acting Minister)	25 March 2020	25 June 2020
Ministry of Education and Science	Serhiy Shkarlet (Acting Minister, Minister)	25 June 2020; 17 December 2020	20 March 2023
Ministry of Education and Science	Oksen Lisovyi	21 March 2023	16 July 2026
Ministry of Education and Science	Andrii Butenko	16 July 2026	Incumbent

Name of Ministry	Name of minister	Term of office	
Name of Ministry	Name of minister	Start	End
Ministry on issues of Science and Technologies	Volodymyr Semynozhenko	28 August 1996	21 April 1998
Ministry on issues of Science and Technologies	Stanislav Dovhyi	23 August 1998	1 April 1999

== See also ==
- Cabinet of Ministers of Ukraine
- National Academy of Sciences of Ukraine
