= Zaigrayevsky District =

Zaigrayevsky District Заиграевский район (Russian)
- District

Other transcription(s)
  - Buryat: Загарайн аймаг
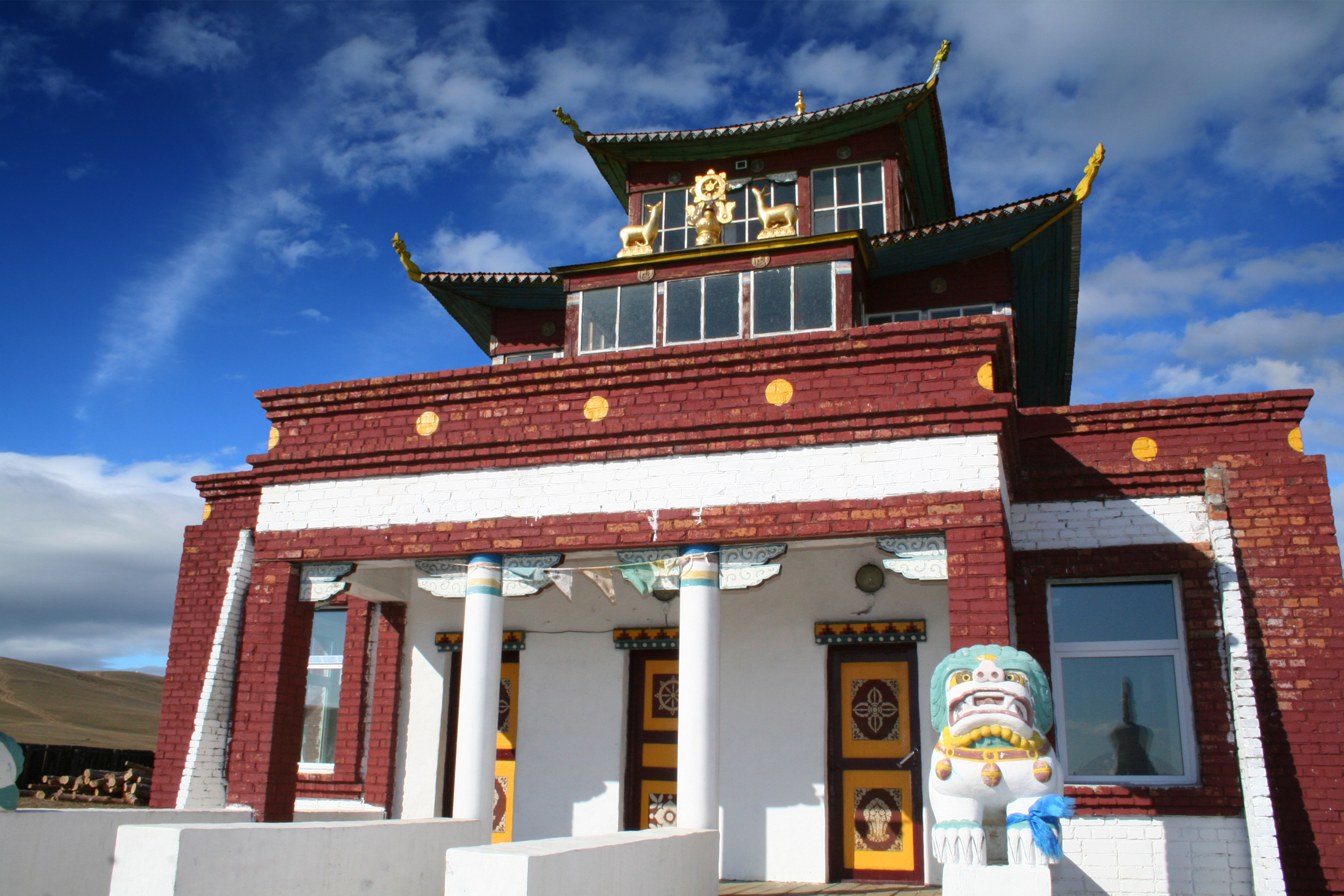
- Atsagatsky Datsan, Zaigrayevsky District

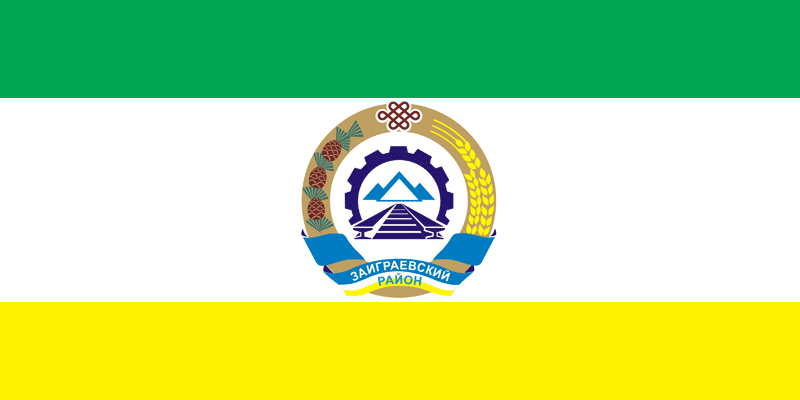
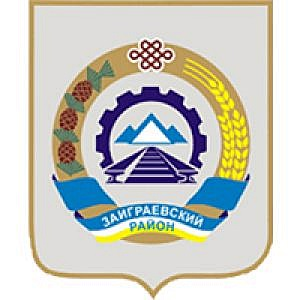
- Flag Coat of arms
- Location of Zaigrayevsky District in the Buryat Republic
- Coordinates: 52°50′N 108°16′E
- Country: Russia
- Federal subject: Republic of Buryatia
- Established: February 11, 1935
- Administrative center: Zaigrayevo

Area
  - Total: 6,605 km^{2} (2,550 sq mi)

Population (2010 Census)
  - Total: 49,975
  - Density: 7.566/km^{2} (19.60/sq mi)
  - Urban: 32.6%
  - Rural: 67.4%

Administrative structure
  - Administrative divisions: 2 Urban-type settlements, 10 Selsoviets, 1 Somons
  - Inhabited localities: 2 urban-type settlements, 43 rural localities

Municipal structure
  - Municipally incorporated as: Zaigrayevsky Municipal District
  - Municipal divisions: 2 urban settlements, 17 rural settlements
- Time zone: UTC+8 (MSK+5)
- OKTMO ID: 81618000
- Website: http://zaigraevo.ru

Zaigrayevsky District (Note: Russian: Заигра́евский райо́н; Buryat: Загарайн аймаг, romanized: Zagarain aimag) is an administrative and municipal district (raion), one of the twenty-one in the Republic of Buryatia, Russia. It is located in the center of the republic. The area of the district is 6,605 square kilometers (2,550 sq mi). Its administrative center is the urban locality (an urban-type settlement) of Zaigrayevo. As of the 2010 Census, the total population of the district was 49,975, with the population of Zaigrayevo accounting for 11.2% of that number.

== History ==
The district was established on February 11, 1935.

== Administrative and municipal status ==
Within the framework of administrative divisions, Zaigrayevsky District is one of the twenty-one in the Republic of Buryatia. It is divided into two urban-type settlements (administrative divisions with the administrative centers, correspondingly, in the urban-type settlements (inhabited localities) of Zaigrayevo and Onokhoy), ten selsoviets, and one somon, all of which comprise forty-three rural localities. As a municipal division, the district is incorporated as Zaigrayevsky Municipal District. Zaigrayevo Urban-Type Settlement is incorporated as an urban settlement within the municipal district. The other urban settlement (Onokhoy Urban Settlement) within the municipal district incorporates the urban-type settlement of Onokhoy with the selo of Todogto and two rural localities in Dabatuysky Somon (the selo of Stary Onokhoy and the ulus of Onokhoy-Shibir). The remaining rural localities in Dabatuysky Somon and the ten selsoviets are incorporated as seventeen rural settlements within the municipal district. The urban-type settlement of Zaigrayevo serves as the administrative center of both the administrative and municipal district.

Historical population
Year	Pop.	±%
1939	31,500	—
1959	51,400	+63.2%
1970	51,400	+0.0%
1979	52,500	+2.1%
1989	56,200	+7.0%
2002	50,437	−10.3%
2010	49,975	−0.9%
2021	50,726	+1.5%
Source: Census data
