= Zaigrayevo =

Zaigrayevo Заиграево
- Urban-type settlement

Other transcription(s)
  - Buryat: Загарай
- Interactive map of Zaigrayevo
- Location of Zaigrayevo Zaigrayevo (Republic of Buryatia)
- Coordinates: 51°51′N 108°13′E
- Country: Russia
- Federal subject: Buryatia
- Administrative district: Zaigrayevsky District
- Urban-type settlementSelsoviet: Zaigrayevo Urban-Type Settlement

Population (2010 Census)
  - Total: 5,586
  - Estimate (2025): 4,539 (−18.7%)

Administrative status
  - Capital of: Zaigrayevsky District, Zaigrayevo Urban-Type Settlement

Municipal status
  - Municipal district: Zaigrayevsky Municipal District
  - Urban settlement: Zaigrayevo Urban Settlement
  - Capital of: Zaigrayevsky Municipal District, Zaigrayevo Urban Settlement
- Time zone: UTC+8 (MSK+5)
- Postal codes: 671310, 671336–671339
- OKTMO ID: 81618151051
- Website: admzaig.jimdo.com

Zaigrayevo population
- 2010 Census: 5,586
- 2002 Census: 5,614
- 1989 Census: 5,565
- 1979 Census: 5,126

Zaigrayevo (Russian: Заигра́ево; Buryat: Загарай, Zagarai) is an urban locality (an urban-type settlement) and the administrative center of Zaigrayevsky District of the Republic of Buryatia, Russia. As of the 2010 Census, its population was 5,586.

== Administrative and municipal status ==
Within the framework of administrative divisions, Zaigrayevo serves as the administrative center of Zaigrayevsky District. As an administrative division, the urban-type settlement (inhabited locality) of Zaigrayevo is incorporated within Zaigrayevsky District as Zaigrayevo Urban-Type Settlement (an administrative division of the district). As a municipal division, Zaigrayevo Urban-Type Settlement is incorporated within Zaigrayevsky Municipal District as Zaigrayevo Urban Settlement.
