= Mykhailo Korolenko =

Ukrainian politician and civil servant (born 1962)

Hero of Ukraine Mykhailo Korolenko OS
- Михайло Короленко
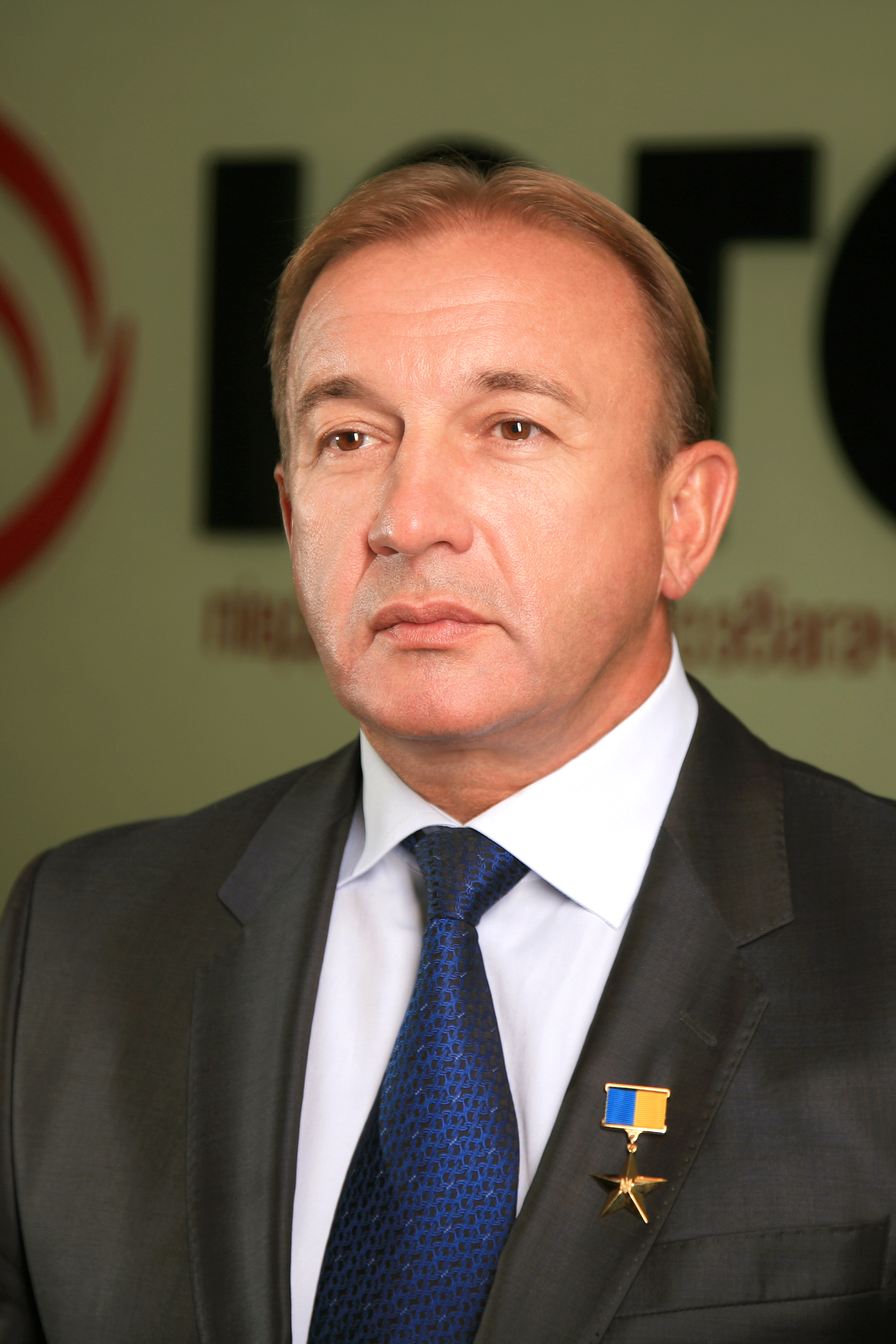
- Korolenko in 2012

11th Minister of Industrial Policy
- In office 5 February 2013 – 27 February 2014
- President: Viktor Yanukovych
- Prime Minister: Mykola Azarov
- Preceded by: Dmytro Kolesnikov
- Succeeded by: Natalia Boytsun (acting)

Personal details
- Born: 20 April 1962 (age 64) Kryvyi Rih, Dnipropetrovsk oblast, USSR
- Party: Party of Regions
- Children: 2
- Education: Kryvyi Rih National University
- Occupation: Politician; civil servant
- Awards: Hero of Ukraine

Mykhailo Kostiantynovych Korolenko (Ukrainian: Михайло Костянтинович Короленко; born 20 April 1962) is a Ukrainian politician and civil servant who is a recipient of both the Hero of Ukraine. Additionally, he was formerly the Minister of Industrial Policy of Ukraine from 2013 to 2014. He significantly contributed to the extraction and enrichment of iron magnetite quartzites, producing iron ore concentrate and domain agglomerate, while also playing a key role in advancing the domestic mining and metallurgical complex through the implementation of modern technologies.

== Early life and education ==
Born on 20 April 1962, in the Ukrainian city of Kryvyi Rih. Korolenko graduated from the Kryvyi Rih Metallurgical College in 1981, earning a degree in mining engineering enrichment from Kryvyi Rih Mining Institute in 1986.

Korolenko held various positions in the plant management from 1986 to 2004, including mill machinist, production master, head of the processing plant's main production site, deputy head of the technical control department, chief enricher, chief engineer, and head of the Southern Mining and Processing Plant. He was appointed chief beneficiant and production director of the Central Mining and Processing Plant in 2004–2005; production director of Northern Mining and Processing Plant in 2005–2006; served as the Party of Regions' deputy for the Kryvyi Rih City Council from 2006 until 2010.

== Career ==
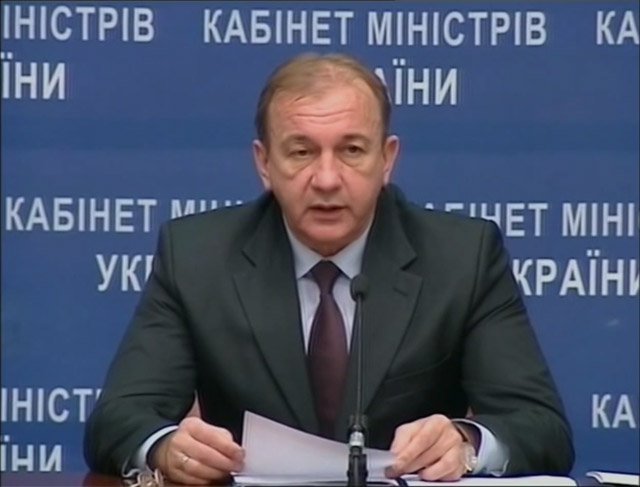
Korolenko in 2013

Korolenko was named Minister of Industrial Policy of Ukraine on 5 February 2013, by proclamation of President Viktor Yanukovych. Ruslan Demchenko and Korolenko, attended the 2013 Dubai Airshow's inauguration. Vice President and UAE Prime Minister Sheikh Mohammed bin Rashid Al Maktoum visited the Ukrainian pavilion on the opening day of the show. There, he met Korolenko, the leader of the Ukrainian delegation, and learned about the aviation sector in Ukraine.

Russia modified its import laws and customs to launch an embargo of Ukrainian goods in mid-August 2013, to the point that the Federal Customs Service of Russia banned all shipments of products from Ukraine on 14 August. Prime Minister Mykola Azarov appointed Yuriy Boiko, Ihor Prasolov, Korolenko, Stepan Deryvolkov, Valery Muntiyan, and Viktor Suslov to a working committee to investigate issues with trade and economic cooperation between Ukraine and Russia.

Practically every industry in Ukraine has been impacted by Russia's tougher rules, but Korolenko claimed that the auto, railroad, and pipe manufacturing industries have been particularly hard hit. Russia has pledged to lift restrictions on steel pipe imports from Ukraine, Korolenko said at a press conference on 17 December. He referenced estimates from experts that, in the event that the Russian–Ukrainian action plan reached in Moscow on the same day by Russian and Ukrainian Presidents Vladimir Putin and Viktor Yanukovych had not taken place, Ukraine would have had to reduce its yearly exports to Russia by between $4 billion and $4.5 billion.

On 18 December 2013, Korolenko declared that as a result, Ukraine's exports had decreased by $1.4 billion. The Ukrainian government has decided to delay the signature of an Association Agreement with the European Union, citing economic setbacks that have worsened the nation's political crisis. According to Korolenko, he wants to make sure that the planned effort does not include shifting the focus or direction of Ukraine's international economic and diplomatic policy.

By a Verkhovna Rada vote on 27 February 2014, Korolenko was removed from his position as head of the Ministry of Industry and Policy. He then went on to preside over the open joint-stock company Zaporizhzhia Iron Ore Plant board from 14 May 2014 until 30 June 2020.

== Personal life ==
Korolenko is married and has two children.

== Awards and recognitions ==
In Kryvyi Rih, his name is memorialized on the Stele of Heroes. Korolenko has received awards and recognitions such as:

- Hero of Ukraine Order of the State (24 August 2012)
- 20 Years of Independence of Ukraine Medal (19 August 2011)
- State Prize of Ukraine in Science and Technology (30 December 2020)
- Honored Worker of Industry of Ukraine (23 February 2012)
- For Merit to the city (Kryvyi Rih) Badge of the 1st Degree (11 April 2012)
- For Merit to the city (Dniprorudne) Badge (2017)
- For Merit to the Zaporizhzhia Oblast Order 1st Degree (2019)
- For Merit to the Zaporizhzhia Oblast Order 2nd Degree (2017)
- For Merit to the Zaporizhzhia Oblast Order 3rd Degree (2014)
