= Valeriy Ivashchenko =

Ukrainian politician

Valeriy Ivaschenko
- Валерій Іващенко
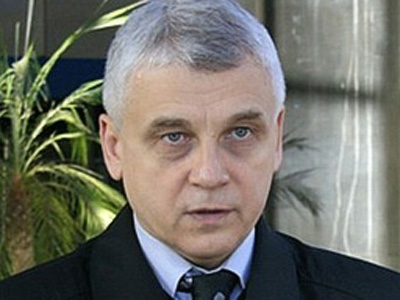

Acting Minister of Defence of Ukraine
- In office 5 June 2009 – 11 March 2010
- President: Viktor Yushchenko
- Prime Minister: Yulia Tymoshenko
- Preceded by: Yuriy Yekhanurov
- Succeeded by: Mykhailo Yezhel

First Deputy Ministry of Strategic Industries
- In office August 2020 – September 2021
- President: Volodymyr Zelenskyy
- Minister: Oleh Uruskyi

Personal details
- Born: 30 July 1956 (age 70) Zaporizhia, Ukrainian SSR, Soviet Union
- Party: Independent
- Children: 2
- Education: Military-Space Academy; Military Academy of the Strategic Missile Forces

Military service
- Allegiance: Soviet Union; Russian Federation; Ukraine
- Branch/service: Russian Air Force; Ministry of Defence of Ukraine
- Years of service: 1978–1993; 1993–1995
- Rank: Colonel
- Commands: Baikonur Cosmodrome staff officer Plesetsk Cosmodrome staff officer Armaments Staff of the Ministry of Defence of Ukraine

Valeriy Volodymyrovych Ivashchenko (Ukrainian: Валерій Володимирович Іващенко; born 30 July 1956) is a former Ukrainian government official, who served as the Deputy Minister of Defense of Ukraine in 2007–2009, and as the Acting Minister from 2009 to 2010. He previously served in the Soviet and Russian armed forces.

== Soviet and Russian military service ==
In 1978, Ivashchenko graduated from the Military Engineering Academy named after Mozhaiskogo (later known as A.F. Mozhaysky Military-Space Academy) in Saint Petersburg. His military officer service began at the Baikonur Cosmodrome.

From 1978 to 1993, he served in military engineering and command positions in the Baikonur and Plesetsk Cosmodromes. In 1993, he graduated from the Dzerzhinsky Military Academy (later known as Peter the Great Military Academy of the Strategic Missile Forces). From 1993 to 1995, Ivashchenko served in positions at the Ukrainian MOD Armament Headquarters.

== Ukrainian Ministry of Defence ==
From 1995 to 1996, he was the Head of the Center of Administrative Management Group's strategic nuclear forces of the Ministry of Defense of Ukraine. From 1996 to 2000, he worked in the Office of Military Mobilization work and law enforcement agencies of the Cabinet of Ministers of Ukraine.

From 2000 to 2001, State Expert management of foreign national security aspects of the National Security and Defense Council of Ukraine. From 2001 to 2003, he served as head of the department of the State Committee on the Military-Industrial Complex of Ukraine.

From 2003 to 2005, he was Head of the Department of Defence and Industry Policy Secretariat of the Cabinet of Ministers of Ukraine. In 2005, he was the Deputy Head of the Department of Industrial Policy of the Cabinet of Ministers of Ukraine.

From 2005 to 2007, Ivashchenko was the Deputy Head of Service Security and Defense Policy as well as the Head of the Defence Office of the President of Ukraine.

From October 2007 to June 2009, he was Ukraine's Deputy Minister of Defence. Following the resignation of Yekhanurov, orders from the Cabinet of Ministers of Ukraine was appointed by the First Deputy Minister of Defence of Ukraine in March 2010, and subsequently served as Minister of Defense of Ukraine.

== Later career ==
From November 2012 to November 2019, he lived in Copenhagen, Denmark, and worked at the Royal Danish Defense Academy.

From August 2020 to September 2021 he was the First Deputy Minister of Strategic Industries of Ukraine.

== Criminal proceeding and contrevercy ==
On August 21, 2010, Ivashchenko was detained by the Military Prosecutor. He was accused of illegally deciding on the sale of the Feodosia Ship & Mechanical Plant's assets. He was arrested three days later.

In June 2011, Ivashchenko announced an indefinite hunger strike in protest against the bias of the panel of judges, but soon stopped the hunger strike due to health. Ivashchenko's lawyers filed a complaint with the European Court of Human Rights in relation to violations of pre-trial and during the trial. In an interview with Kommersant, Ivashchenko said he had no relation to the sale of property alienation and CRS.

On April 12, 2012, he was sentenced by a district court in Kyiv to five years of imprisonment.

Ivashchenko said that his case was fabricated by former Deputy Prosecutor Vitaly Shchetkin.

The USA and the European Union criticized the judgment and spoke of "selective justice".

A European Parliament mission led by former Polish President Aleksander Kwaśniewski investigated several trials and criminal judgments in Ukraine in the summer of 2012 (including those against Ivashchenko and against Yulia Tymoshenko and Yuriy Lutsenko) and criticized the Ukrainian judiciary in the process.

On August 14, 2012, an appellate court reduced Ivashchenko's sentence to a one-year prison sentence, which was suspended and released from custody in the courtroom.

Ivashchenko fled to Denmark, and in January 2013, the Danish government granted him and his wife political asylum.

On April 4, 2014, the court canceled the sentence for Ivashchenko.

== Personal information ==
He is married and has a son and a daughter.
