= Ozhydiv phosphorus spill =

2007 train derailment in Ukraine

Ozhydiv railway station, in the vicinity of which the accident took place

On 16 July 2007, a freight train travelling from Kazakhstan to Poland derailed near the village of Ozhydiv in Lviv Oblast, Ukraine. As a result, 15 cisterns laden with yellow phosphorus overturned on the railway section between Ozhydiv and Krasne. Six of the cisterns caught fire, producing toxic fumes which spread many kilometers around the site.

== Effects ==
14 settlements in the disaster area were declared to be under risk. Localization of the consequences of the accident took over a month. The accident resulted in 145 people being hospitalized, among them 43 children. More than 160 locals had to apply for meidcal help due to inhalation of chemicals. The accident led to major damage to the natural environment, with media reports comparing it to the Chernobyl disaster.

In November 2007, on the advice of scientific institutions, Lviv Oblast Council approved a decision to perform ecological monitoring of the disaster area for the following 3 years. By February 2008, 5,775 people from affected areas were reported to have received medical help from the local authorities, with 6,42 million hryvnias being allocated for their treatment.

== Investigation ==
Ukrainian Railways officially accused Kazakh owners of the phosphorus cisterns of being responsible for the accident. According to the Ukrainian side, the cisterns containing the chemical had been improperly sealed, which caused the spill. However, the Kazakh side refused to acknowledge the validity of those claims, and declined to compensate the damage.

As of July 2009, no conclusive answer in respect to responsibility for the accident had been presented by the Ukrainian government commission responsible for the investigation.
