= Natalia Boytsun =

Ukrainian government official, economist and scientist

Natalia Boytsun

Natalia Boytsun (Ukrainian: Наталія Євгенівна Бойцун; born 31 March 1960) is a Ukrainian government official, economist and scientist.

== Biography ==
In 1982, Boytsun graduated summa cum laude from the Faculty of Mathematics and Mechanics of Oles Honchar Dnipro National University in Dnipro, Ukraine.

From 1984 to 2005, Boytsun worked at the Dnipropetrovsk State University. Till 1994 she had a position of a scientific researcher and had been working in the sphere of hydrodynamics in microgravity. Her research was conducted in cooperation with Yuzhmash, a world-known, state-owned aerospace manufacturer located in Dnipro.

Boytsun became professor of International Finance (2001), Head of Department (1997 - 2005), Dean of the new Faculty of International Economics (1997 – 2005) in her alma mater Boytsun has published textbooks for the new curriculum in Economics for Ukrainian universities. She also applied mathematical skills in teaching Economics and Finance. Boytsun established the annual international scientific Conference “Finances of Ukraine” (since 1997).

Boytsun has created a scientific school about Economic and Financial Integration for the Transitional Economy.

From 2006 to 2007, Boytsun served as the Vice Rector of International Management Institute (IMI, Kyiv) and the Head of MBA Program.

In 2005, Boytsun was invited to work at the Dnipropetrovsk Region State Administration, on a position of Vice Governor (Dnipropetrovsk Oblast is one of the leading industry regions of Ukraine). As Vice Governor, Boytsun was responsible for the economy, finance and the EU integration process in the Dnipropetrovsk Region (till December 2005).

From 2007 to 2014, Boytsun continued governmental career as a high-profile government official, she worked in five national Governments of Ukraine (Cabinet of Ministers of Ukraine).

From 2007 to 2010, Boytsun served as Deputy Minister of Economy of Ukraine. She supervised the sphere of international economic relations and provided international trade control and regulations. Prof. Boytsun enhanced legislation of bilateral trade and economic cooperation agreements, conducted negotiations on trade, goods and service access on markets of EU, NIS, CIS, USA, China, Brazil, Mexico, South Korea, Austria, Switzerland, UK.

From 2010 to 2013, Boytsun worked in the sphere of International Relations in Energy, as the Director of Euro integration and International relations Department of Ministry of Energy of Ukraine. Boytsun initiated the Review of Ukraine Energy Policy and invited International Energy Agency to take a part in the research. Survey on Ukrainian Energy Policy was published by IEA in 2012.

From 2011 to 2016, Boytsun was the Vice-Chair of Bureau for the Committee on Sustainable Energy of United Nations Economic Commission for Europe (UNECE, Geneva).

From 2011 to 2012, Boytsun was the first delegate from Ukraine in the High Level Permanent Group of the European Energy Community (Vienna) and took a part in the development of Energy Security Policy of Member States.

From 2011 to 2013, Boytsun was elected and served as Vice – President in the Investment Group of the Energy Charter Conference (Brussels).

In June 2013, she started to serve as the Deputy Minister - Chief of Staff, Ministry of Industrial policy of Ukraine.

Since February 2014, Boytsun has been Acting Minister of the Industrial Policy of Ukraine until the Ministry of the Industrial Policy was merged with the Ministry of the Economic development and Trade of Ukraine in April 2014.

Boytsun took an active part in the Regulation of the first custom and transit conflict with RF in August 2013

In October 2014, Boytsun decided to stand down from government service for health reasons.

=== Honors ===
- Honored Economist of Ukraine 2008

== See also ==
- Natalia Greshchuk
