= Prysyazhnyuk =

Prysyazhnyuk (Ukrainian: Присяжнюк) is a Ukrainian surname. Notable people with the surname include:

- Anatolii Prysyazhnyuk (born 1953), Ukrainian politician and chief of militsiya
- Mykola Prysyazhnyuk (born 1960), Ukrainian politician and government minister
