= Iron diplomacy =

Transport of world leaders in Ukraine by rail

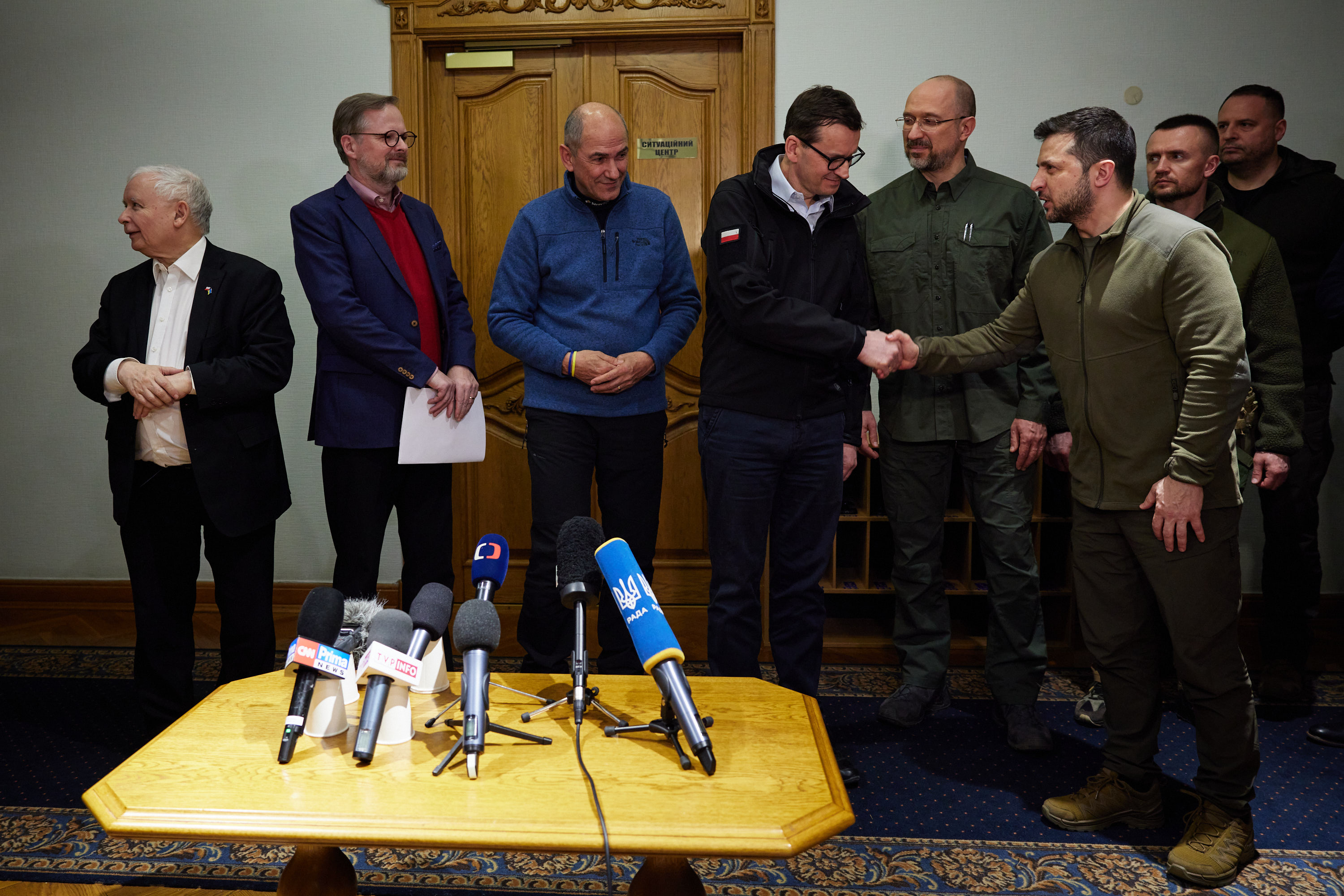
The first foreign delegation to Kyiv during the 2022 invasion meeting with Ukrainian leaders in front of the situation room after arriving by rail (Note: From left to right: Polish deputy prime minister Jarosław Kaczyński, Czech prime minister Petr Fiala, Slovenian prime minister Janez Janša, Polish prime minister Mateusz Morawiecki, Ukrainian prime minister Denys Shmyhal, and Ukrainian president Volodymyr Zelenskyy.)

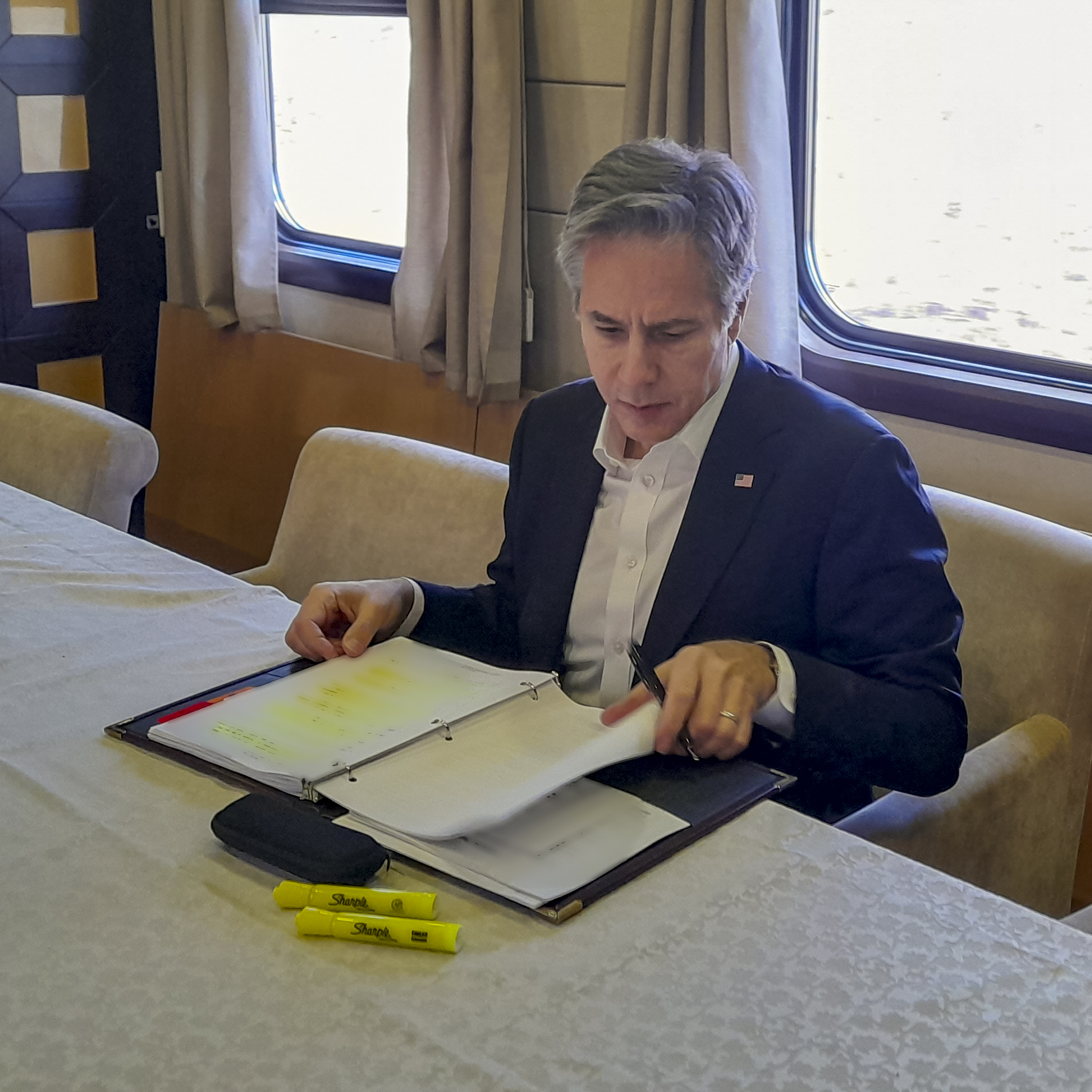
US secretary of state Antony Blinken on the train to Kyiv

"Iron diplomacy" (Ukrainian: залізна дипломатія, romanized: zalizna dyplomatiia) refers to the practice of transporting world leaders from Poland through Ukraine via rail since the start of the Russian invasion of Ukraine in 2022. The expression was coined by Oleksandr Kamyshin, the head of Ukrainian Railways, because many diplomats were being shuttled by train to and from Kyiv, the capital city, as the use of Ukrainian airspace was impractical due to the invasion. In addition, the first foreign leaders to visit Kyiv had decided to avoid travelling from Poland to Ukraine via a Polish military jet, in case Russia interpreted it as an escalating move. The journeys, including US President Joe Biden's 2023 visit, begin in Poland with a flight to Rzeszów-Jasionka Airport and then transfer to Przemyśl Główny railway station, where the visiting leaders board an overnight train to Kyiv.

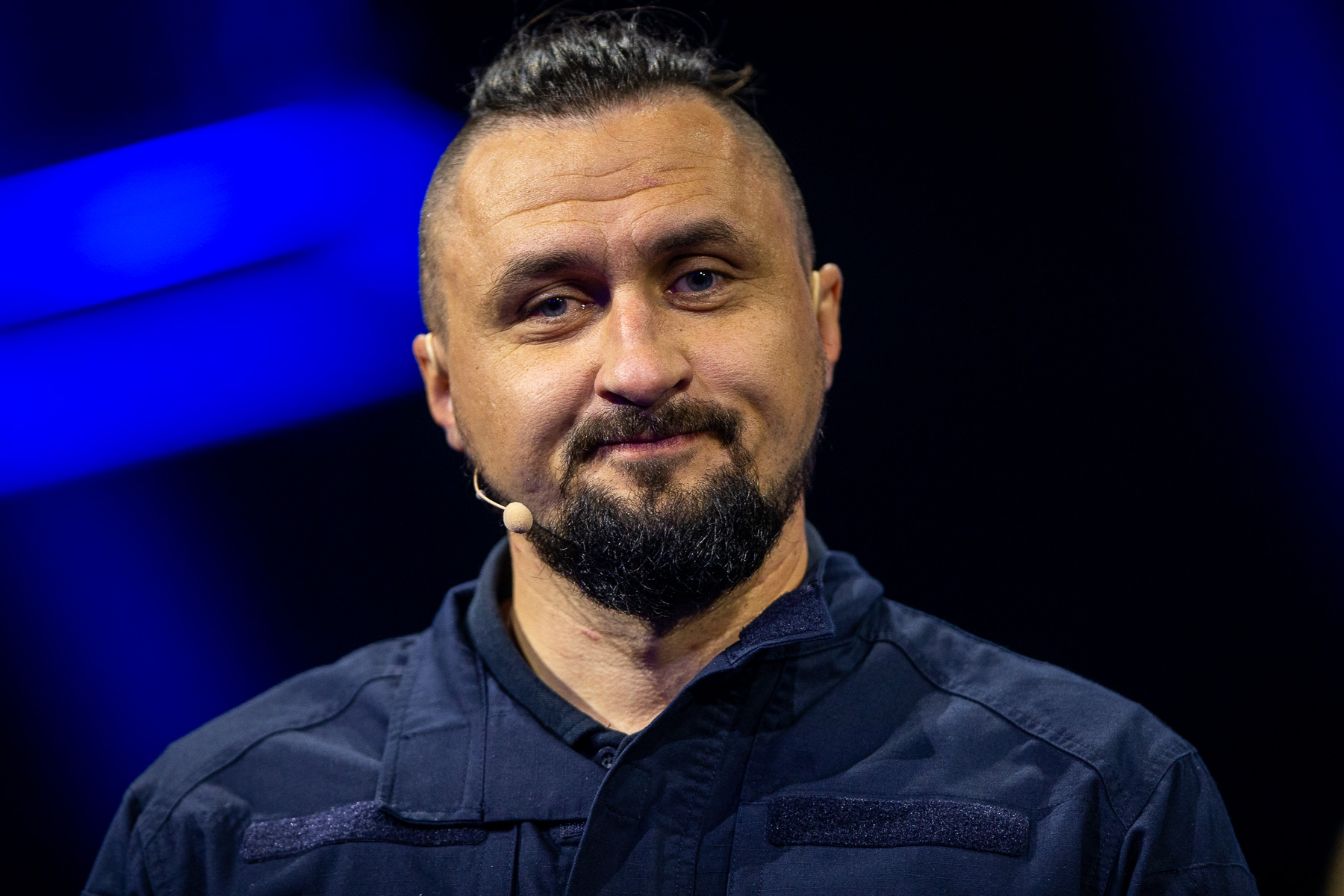
Oleksandr Kamyshin, head of Ukrainian Railways

== Rail system ==
External media

Images
- A conductor showing the dining car
- A well-furnished meeting room
- The first foreign delegation in transit
- Von der Leyen amongst furnishings

Video
- Scholz and Draghi in Macron's room

Since the start of the Russian invasion in 2022, Ukraine's airspace has been closed and its roads have become unreliable due to fighting. As a result, the country has been forced to rely heavily on its rail system for transport, including for humanitarian aid, refugees, weapons, and food for export. As the rail system is crucial in Ukraine's resistance to the invasion, Ukrainian Railways has continued to run despite repeated attacks against the system, such as the attack on Kramatorsk station. Security has also increased, and Aleksandr Kamyshin, who runs Ukrainian Railways, is now armed and accompanied by two bodyguards, keeps his schedule and location secret, and avoids physical contact with his family. (Note: Kamyshin also carries his son's stuffed owl with him.)

Diplomats and other world leaders who wish to travel through Ukraine are faced with a similar lack of options, so they regularly take part in Kamyshin's iron diplomacy program. The train ride takes nearly 10 hours. Ukraine also provides a security detail for the visiting leaders, and Kamyshin also keeps their travel details secret, but sometimes information ends up being publicized before the delegation has left Ukraine, which increases the risk of an attack. In anticipation of possible attack, two alternate routes are always prepared.

As of December 2024, more than 1000 trips were provided to foreign dignitaries.

== Carriages ==
One of the carriages used in the iron diplomacy program was originally constructed for rich tourists to the Crimean peninsula. Completed in 2014, it was used only a few times before Russia annexed the peninsula early that year. Recently modernized carriages from the Soviet era have also been used for the iron diplomacy program. Although most cars have been retrofitted with upscale furnishings to allow visiting leaders to travel comfortably, not all carriages have been refurbished to the same standard. Discrepancies regarding train car accommodations were noted by the French president Emmanuel Macron, the German chancellor Olaf Scholz, and the Italian prime minister Mario Draghi during their joint trip to Kyiv in June 2022. Some carriages are fitted with conference room and private bedroom with an ensuite bathroom. Due to the limited number of furnished carriages, not all foreign dignitaries travel in these carriages.

== Notable visits ==
| Date | Travellers | Representing | To | Notes | Rf. |
|---|---|---|---|---|---|
| 2022-03-15 | Mateusz Morawiecki, prime minister Petr Fiala, prime minister Janez Janša, prime minister Jarosław Kaczyński, deputy prime minister | Poland Czechia Slovenia Poland | Kyiv | First visit by foreign leaders during the invasion | |
| 2022-04-01 | Roberta Metsola, parliament president | EU | Kyiv | First visit by a top EU official during the invasion; Trip details withheld for security reasons; Kamyshin asserted weeks later that "[a]ll Western leaders ... arrived by train"; Metsola addressed the Verkhovna Rada in person | |
| 2022-04-08 | Ursula von der Leyen, commission president Josep Borrell, foreign affairs representative Eduard Heger, prime minister | EU EU Slovakia | Kyiv | Visit occurred hours after Kramatorsk railway station was attacked, killing 59; Von der Leyen presented a questionnaire to assist with the EU application process | |
| 2022-04-09 | Boris Johnson, prime minister | UK | Kyiv | Visit occurred during the Partygate scandal in the UK | |
| 2022-04-09 | Karl Nehammer, chancellor | Austria | Kyiv | Nehammer also visited the town of Bucha, Kyiv Oblast, the scene of the Bucha massacre; Two days later, on 11 April, Nehammer met Russian president Vladimir Putin in Moscow | |
| 2022-04-13 | Alar Karis, president Egils Levits, president Gitanas Nausėda, president Andrzej Duda, president | Estonia Latvia Lithuania Poland | Kyiv | The four presidents also visited the heavily bombed town of Borodianka; German president Frank-Walter Steinmeier originally planned to take part in this visit, but had his invitation withdrawn by the Ukrainian government. Steinmeier eventually visited Ukraine on 25 October 2022 | |
| 2022-04-24 | Antony Blinken, secretary of state Lloyd Austin, secretary of defense | US | Kyiv | Visit occurred hours before Krasne railway station was attacked, amongst others; Unclear if the secretaries were still in transit at the time of the attacks | |
| 2022-04-28 | António Guterres, secretary-general | UN | Kyiv | Visit occurred two days after Guterres held talks with Putin in Moscow; Central Kyiv was attacked while Guterres was still in the city; Two rockets exploded in the Shevchenkivskyi District, shocking the UN team | |
| 2022-04-30 | Nancy Pelosi, speaker | US | Kyiv | Pelosi's delegation included several Democratic Party members of the United States House of Representatives: Intelligence Committee chair Adam Schiff, Rules Committee chair Jim McGovern, Foreign Affairs Committee chair Gregory Meeks, Jason Crow, Barbara Lee, and Bill Keating | |
| 2022-05-08 | Justin Trudeau, prime minister Chrystia Freeland, deputy prime minister Mélanie Joly, foreign affairs minister (Note: Also part of the Canadian delegation were Jody Thomas, national security advisor; Katie Telford, chief of staff; and Brian Clow, deputy chief of staff.) | Canada | Kyiv | The delegation reopened the Canadian embassy in Kyiv; Security detail included members of Canada's Joint Task Force 2 | |
| 2022-05-22 | Andrzej Duda, president | Poland | Kyiv | Duda addressed the Rada, becoming the first foreign head of state to address the parliament in-person since the Russian invasion | |
| 2022-05-26 | Sanna Marin, prime minister | Finland | Kyiv | Marin also visited the towns of Bucha and Irpin, in the aftermath of the Bucha massacre and the Battle of Irpin | |
| 2022-06-16 | Emmanuel Macron, president Olaf Scholz, chancellor Mario Draghi, prime minister | France Germany Italy | Kyiv | The leaders announced their support for granting EU candidate status to Ukraine | |
| 2022-06-16 | Klaus Iohannis, president | Romania | Kyiv | Iohannis joined Macron, Scholz, and Draghi in Kyiv but had travelled separately; He also announced his support for granting EU candidate status to Ukraine | |
| 2022-06-17 | Boris Johnson, prime minister | UK | Kyiv | The UK agrees to help train Ukrainian soldiers to improve their combat readiness | |
| 2022-06-29 | Joko Widodo, president | Indonesia | Kyiv | First visit by the leader of an Asian country during the invasion; Visit occurred shortly after Widodo attended the G7 summit in Bavaria; Indonesia is scheduled to host the next G20 summit in Bali | |
| 2022-07-03 | Anthony Albanese, prime minister | Australia | Kyiv | First visit ever by an Australian prime minister to Ukraine; Security detail included armed soldiers from Australia's and Ukraine's special forces; Media blackout was breached while the delegation was still travelling around Kyiv | |
| 2022-07-25 | Alejandro Giammattei, president | Guatemala | Kyiv | First visit by the leader of a Latin American country during the invasion | |
| 2022-10-20 | Ignazio Cassis, president | Switzerland | Kyiv | Cassis met with president Volodymyr Zelenskyy, prime minister Denys Shmyhal and foreign minister Dmytro Kuleba to discuss humanitarian assistance and rebuilding efforts; Cassis also visited Ivankiv and Borodianka | |
| 2022-10-25 | Frank-Walter Steinmeier, president | Germany | Kyiv | Steinmeier was due to visit on 20 October, but was advised to postpone due to the tense security situation in Kyiv caused by a wave of cruise missile and drone attacks across Ukraine; Steinmeier planned to visit in April 2022 along with the presidents of Estonia, Latvia, Lithuania and Poland, but his invitation was rescinded by Ukraine. Steinmeier had a telephone conversation with president Zelenskyy in May, during which Zelenskyy extended an invitation to Steinmeier to visit.; Steinmeier also visited the town of Koriukivka, where he met Ukrainian officials in an air-raid shelter due to the launching of Iranian-designed Russian drones from Belarus. | |
| 2022-11-19 | Rishi Sunak, prime minister | UK | Kyiv | Announced new anti-air military aid | |
| 2022-11-26 | Alexander De Croo, prime minister Katalin Novák, president Ingrida Šimonytė, prime minister Mateusz Morawiecki, prime minister | Belgium Hungary Lithuania Poland | Kyiv | The four leaders together with president Zelenskyy launched the "Grain from Ukraine" initiative, which aims to export Ukrainian grain to countries vulnerable to famine and drought | |
| 2022-11-28 | Urmas Reinsalu, foreign minister Pekka Haavisto, foreign minister Þórdís Kolbrún R. Gylfadóttir, foreign minister Edgars Rinkēvičs, foreign minister Gabrielius Landsbergis, foreign minister Anniken Huitfeldt, foreign minister Tobias Billström, foreign minister | Estonia Finland Iceland Latvia Lithuania Norway Sweden | Kyiv | The delegation of seven foreign ministers visited damaged energy infrastructure due to the October–November 2022 nationwide missile strikes on Ukraine | |
| 2023-01-30 | Mette Frederiksen, prime minister | Denmark | Mykolaiv, Odesa | Frederiksen was received by Zelenskyy, and the two leaders visited a hospital treating wounded soldiers and the Port of Mykolaiv | |
| 2023-02-20 | Joe Biden, president | United States | Kyiv | Main article: 2023 visit by Joe Biden to Ukraine: Biden was received by president Zelenskyy and first lady Olena Zelenska at Mariinskyi Palace. The two presidents visited the Wall of Remembrance at St. Michael's Golden-Domed Monastery, where they laid wreaths and held a moment of silence. Biden also visited the Embassy of the United States, Kyiv, and announced additional US assistance to Ukraine. | |
| 2023-02-21 | Giorgia Meloni, prime minister | Italy | Kyiv | Meloni met with president Zelenskyy, and visited Bucha and Irpin. | |
| 2023-02-23 | Pedro Sánchez, prime minister | Spain | Kyiv | Sánchez met with president Zelenskyy, and visited Bucha and Irpin. | |
| 2023-04-28 | Petr Pavel, president Zuzana Čaputová, president | Czech Republic Slovakia | Kyiv, Dnipro | The two presidents visited Borodianka and met with president Zelenskyy; Pavel also visited Bucha and Dnipro | |
| 2023-06-10 | Justin Trudeau, prime minister | Canada | Kyiv | Trudeau and deputy prime minister Chrystia Freeland met president Zelenskyy; Trudeau laid a wreath at a memorial for fallen Ukrainian soldiers at St. Michael's Golden-Domed Monastery, addressed the Ukrainian parliament, and announced C$500 million in new military aid for Ukraine | |
| 2025-02-24 | Justin Trudeau, prime minister Mette Frederiksen, prime minister Kristen Michal, prime minister Ursula von der Leyen, commission president António Costa, council president Alexander Stubb, president Benjamin Haddad, minister delegate Kristrún Frostadóttir, prime minister Edgars Rinkēvičs, president Gitanas Nausėda, president Jonas Gahr Støre, prime minister Feridun Sinirlioğlu, secretary general Pedro Sánchez, prime minister Ulf Kristersson, prime minister | Canada Denmark Estonia EU EU Finland France Iceland Latvia Lithuania Norway OSCE Spain Sweden | Kyiv | Trudeau opened a summit for peace and security on Ukraine and pledged military and monetary aid; Several leaders like von der Leyen and Sánchez also unveiled aid packages | |
| 2024-08-23 | Narendra Modi, prime minister | India | Kyiv | Modi and minister of external affairs S. Jaishankar met president Zelenskyy; Modi also visited the National Museum of the History of Ukraine and donated humanitarian aid to the Ukrainian government on behalf of India. | |
| 2025-05-10 | Emmanuel Macron, president Friedrich Merz, chancellor Donald Tusk, prime minister Keir Starmer, prime minister | France Germany Poland UK | Kyiv | | |

== See also ==
- Compiègne Wagon
