= Herman Smetanin =

Ukrainian politician (born 1992)

- Герман Сметанін
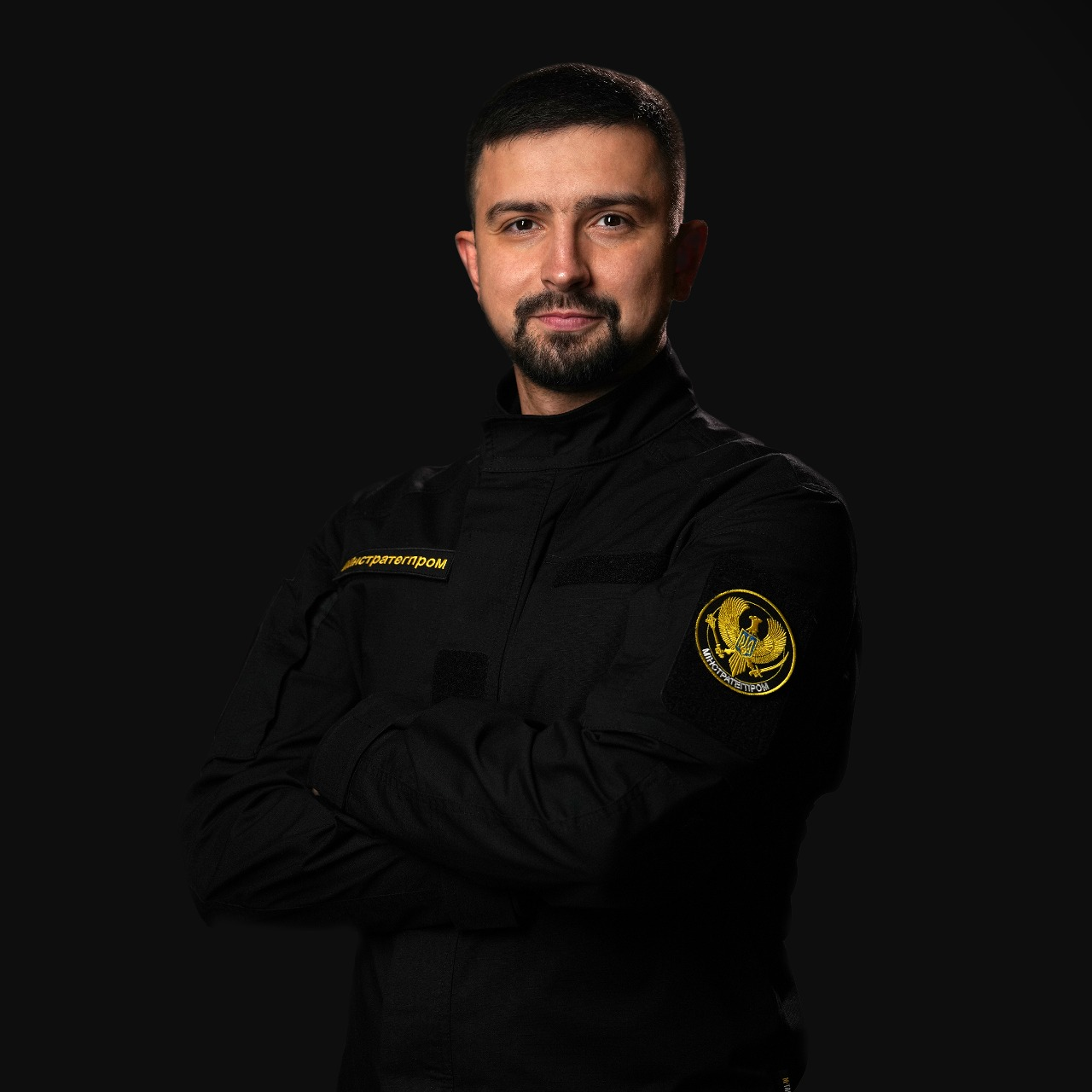
- Official portrait, 2024

Minister of Strategic Industries
- In office 5 September 2024 – 16 July 2025
- President: Volodymyr Zelenskyy
- Prime Minister: Denys Shmyhal
- Preceded by: Oleksandr Kamyshin

Personal details
- Born: 8 October 1992 (age 33) Kharkiv, Kharkiv Oblast, Ukraine
- Education: Kharkiv Secondary School No. 49
- Alma mater: Kharkiv National Automobile and Highway University; Kyiv Polytechnic Institute

Herman Volodymyrovych Smetanin (Ukrainian: Герман Володимирович Сметанін; born 8 October 1992) is a Ukrainian politician who was the Minister of Strategic Industries since the 5 September 2024 to 16 July 2025. Herman is also a defense industry management executive, General Director of the Joint Stock Company "Ukrainian Defense Industry" (since June 28, 2023), former General Director of the state enterprise "Malyshev Factory" (2023), and former Director of the Kharkiv Armored Plant (2021–2022).

== Biography ==
=== Early years ===
Herman Smetanin was born on October 8, 1992, in the city of Kharkiv. He graduated from Kharkiv Secondary School No. 49.

=== Education ===
He obtained a degree as a design engineer for wheeled and tracked vehicles at Kharkiv National Automobile and Highway University.

In 2019, he received a master's degree in management in the defense industry sector from the National Technical University of Ukraine "Igor Sikorsky Kyiv Polytechnic Institute."

=== Career ===
From 2014 to 2015, Herman Smetanin worked at the Kharkiv Machine Building Design Bureau, part of the state concern "Ukroboronprom." He was a leading specialist in the development of the TBKM "Dozor-B" armored combat vehicle and organized its state testing.

From April 2016 to January 2020, he worked initially as the Chief Designer and later as the Chief Engineer at the Lviv Armored Plant. Under Smetanin's leadership in Lviv, the GPM-72 tracked firefighting vehicle and the BREM "Zubr" and BREM "Lev" armored recovery vehicles were developed based on the T-72 tank.

In 2020–2021, he served as the Production Director at the Malyshev Factory. From March 2021 to November 2022, he was the Director of the Kharkiv Armored Plant. From December 2022 to June 2023, he headed the Malyshev Factory, initially as the Production Director and Acting General Director and from April 2023 as the General Director.

On June 28, 2023, Smetanin was appointed General Director of the Joint Stock Company "Ukrainian Defense Industry," which was created by transforming the state concern "Ukroboronprom."

On the 5th September 2024, the Verkhovna Rada of Ukraine appointed Smetanin as the Minister of Strategic Industries of Ukraine, succeeding Oleksandr Kamyshin.

On 16 July 2025, the Verkhovna Rada of Ukraine dismissed Smetanin as the Minister of Strategic Industries.

== Activities ==
=== As Chief Engineer at the State Enterprise "Lviv Armored Plant" ===
Under Herman Smetanin's leadership at the State Enterprise "Lviv Armored Plant," the plant successfully mastered the regulated repair of the BREM-1 armored recovery vehicle, the GPM-54 tracked firefighting vehicle, the T-64 tank, and its modifications. The GPM-72 tracked armored firefighting vehicle and the "Lev" armored recovery vehicle were developed, and after undergoing departmental tests, they were approved for use by the Ukrainian Armed Forces. The first batch of "Dozor-B" tactical combat wheeled vehicles was also produced under his supervision.

=== As Director of the State Enterprise "Kharkiv Armored Plant" ===
During Herman Smetanin's tenure as Director of the State Enterprise "Kharkiv Armored Plant," the company increased its production output by no less than 20% annually compared to similar periods in previous years. The development, testing, and production of the first batches of T-64BVK (command) tanks were completed, as well as the deep modernization of T-64 tanks to the T-64BM2 version.

=== As General Director of the State Enterprise "Malyshev Factory" ===
During Herman Smetanin's time as General Director of the State Enterprise "Malyshev Factory," the company more than tripled its production output, increasing it by 3.3 times, and achieved profitability in its financial operations.

=== As General Director of JSC "Ukrainian Defense Industry" ===
According to the Minister of Strategic Industries, Oleksandr Kamyshin, during the appointment of Herman Smetanin as the General Director of JSC "Ukrainian Defense Industry," three main tasks were set before him: increasing the production of ammunition and military equipment, building an effective anti-corruption infrastructure within the company, and transforming "Ukroboronprom."

Key achievements:

- In the framework of institutional reform of the Ukrainian defense industry, in July 2023, JSC "Ukrainian Defense Industry" issued simple registered shares, with the state becoming the owner. In December 2023, the government appointed a supervisory board for "Ukroboronprom." As of September 2024, 42 enterprises under JSC "Ukrainian Defense Industry" were transformed into private limited companies.
- As part of the development of anti-corruption infrastructure, in August 2023, the Anti-Corruption Strategy of JSC "Ukrainian Defense Industry" for 2023–2024 was approved. JSC "Ukrainian Defense Industry" became the first state-owned company to implement an internal transparent property management policy based on a corruption risk analysis. In line with the Anti-Corruption Strategy, Herman Smetanin publicly announced his personal commitments as General Director.
- The production volumes of arms and military equipment by JSC "Ukrainian Defense Industry" in 2023 were doubled. In the first quarter of 2024, a 50% growth was achieved compared to the first quarter of the previous year. In 2024, JSC "Ukrainian Defense Industry" ranked 49th in the TOP 100 Defense Companies 2024, which includes the world's leading arms manufacturers, and became a leader in revenue growth from military product sales. Revenue from military product sales in 2023 increased by 72% compared to 2022.
- One of the main directions was identified as cooperation with manufacturers from NATO and European Union member countries, particularly for technology transfer to domestic enterprises. During 2023–2024, JSC "Ukrainian Defense Industry" announced partnerships with companies from the USA—Northrop Grumman, Day & Zimmermann, Amentum Services; Germany—Rheinmetall AG, MBDA Deutschland, Dynamit Nobel Defence; the Czech Republic—Sellier & Bellot, Česká zbrojovka, and others. In July 2024, during a visit to the United States, Herman Smetanin opened the first very foreign representative office of JSC "Ukrainian Defense Industry" in Washington, D.C.
