= Krasne railway station =

In Krasne, Lviv, Ukraine, built in 1869

Krasne Красне
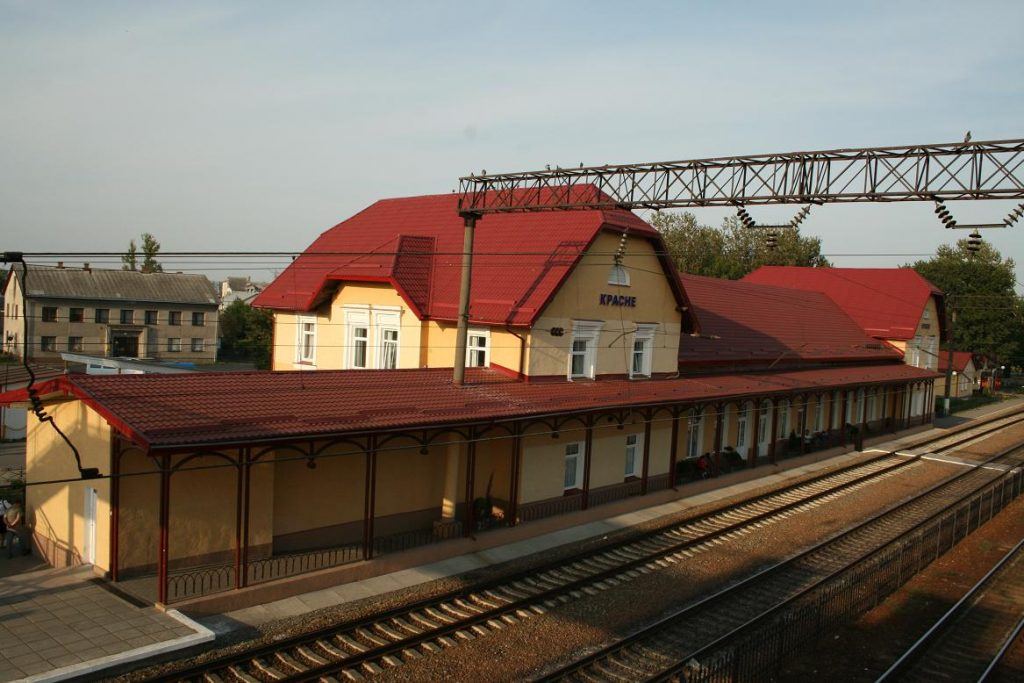

General information
- Location: Lviv Oblast; Ukraine
- Coordinates: 49.9172°N 24.6160°E

History
- Opened: 1869 (157 years ago)
Location

External media

Images
- Station exterior facing the tracks

Video
- Video posted by Maksym Kozytskyy on 25 April 2022 reportedly showing the traction substation on fire

Krasne is a railway station in Krasne, Lviv Oblast, Ukraine. The station was first opened in 1869 as part of the Karl Ludwig Railway. A branch from Krasne was later extended into the Russian Empire in 1871.

The station was attacked by German forces in 1941 during World War II. It was also reportedly attacked during the 2022 Russian invasion of Ukraine.

== History ==
The railway station at Krasne was opened on 12 July 1869 as part of the 92-kilometre (57 mi) Lviv–Krasne–Brody line of the Karl Ludwig Railway. A branch from Krasne to Ternopil was completed in 1870. This branch was extended further east in 1871 to Pidvolochysk and then to Volochysk in the Russian Empire.

In 1892, ownership of the Karl Ludwig Railway was transferred to the Austrian government.

In 1941, during World War II, the station came under attack by German forces.

The railway section from Lviv through Krasne to Zdolbuniv was electrified at some point during the 1960s and 1970s. In 1994, the 26-kilometre (16 mi) section between Krasne and Zolochiv was also electrified.

On 25 April 2022 at 08:30 EEST (05:30 UTC), during the 2022 Russian invasion of Ukraine, Oleksandr Kamyshin, the head of Ukrainian Railways, reported that five railway stations in western and central Ukraine had been attacked that morning, all within an hour. Maksym Kozytskyy, the governor of Lviv Oblast, stated that a missile had struck Krasne's traction substation, causing an explosion. Kamyshin had noted that the attacks on the stations had caused a number of casualties, although a worker at Krasne had stated that there were none specifically in the Krasne station area. (Note: Serhiy Borzov, the governor of Vinnytsia Oblast, reported that there had been casualties in his region.) The attacks occurred hours after Antony Blinken, the U.S. secretary of state, and Lloyd Austin, the U.S. secretary of defense, had met Ukrainian president Volodymyr Zelenskyy in Kyiv. The secretaries had stated that they had travelled to and from Kyiv via rail, although it was unclear whether they were in transit at the time of the attack. (Note: They had been holding a news conference in Poland around the time the strikes were being reported.) Kamyshin noted that, because use of Ukrainian airspace was impractical due to the invasion, many diplomats were being shuttled to and from Kyiv by train, a practice which he called "iron diplomacy".

== See also ==
- Lviv railway station
- Kramatorsk railway station attack
