= Ministry of Strategic Industries =

Government ministry of Ukraine

Ministry of Strategic Industries of Ukraine
- Міністерство з питань стратегічних галузей промисловості України
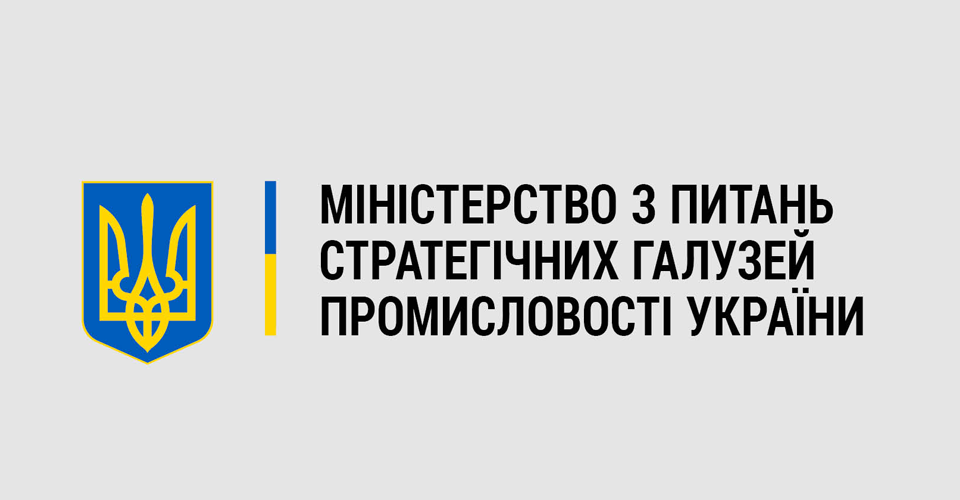

Agency overview
- Formed: 22 July 2020
- Dissolved: 17 July 2025
- Jurisdiction: Government of Ukraine
- Minister responsible: Herman Smetanin

The Ministry of Strategic Industries of Ukraine (Ukrainian: Міністерство з питань стратегічних галузей промисловості, romanized: Ministerstvo z pytan stratehichnykh haluzei promyslovosti) is a former government ministry in Ukraine that existed from July 2020 to July 2025.

== History ==
Prime minister Denys Shmyhal stated (at a government meeting on 22 July 2020) that the new ministry would focus primarily on industrial development, as well as defense and high-tech industries.

The ministry's first minister was Oleh Urusky who was appointed on 16 July 2020 (and who was also appointed Vice Prime Minister in the Shmyhal Government simultaneously). According to minister Urusky (also stated on 22 July 2020) the ministry's goal was "sustainable development of strategic industries, job creation, increase budget revenues, regional development, will have a positive impact on the market environment."

In October 2020 it was reported that the ministry was set to reform the State Defense Holding Ukroboronprom and split it into two "Defense Systems of Ukraine" (Ukrainian: Оборонні системи України) and "Avia-space Systems of Ukraine" (Ukrainian: Авіакосмічні системи України). It was expected that companies of the State Space Agency of Ukraine will join the organization as well.

On 17 July 2025 the Ukrainian parliament passed a law to merge the ministry with the Ministry of Defence of Ukraine.

== List of ministers ==
Name of minister	Term of office		Photo
Name of minister	Start	End	Photo
Oleh Uruskyi	16 July 2020	3 November 2021	
Pavlo Riabikin	4 November 2021	20 March 2023	
Oleksandr Kamyshin	21 March 2023	4 September 2024	
Herman Smetanin	5 September 2024	17 July 2025 (defunct)	

== See also ==
- Ministry of Industrial Policy (Ukraine)
- Industry in Ukraine
- Shmyhal Government

== Lobbyism ==
Ministry hired former U.S. Democrat Congressman Jim Moran to provide government relations services.
