= Volodymyr Shandra =

Ukrainian politician

- Володимир Шандра
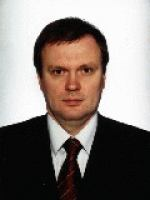

Governor of Kyiv Oblast
- In office 2 March 2014 – 27 January 2016
- Preceded by: Anatoliy Prysiazhniuk
- Succeeded by: Maksym Melnychuk

Minister of Ukraine of Emergencies and Affairs of Population Protection from the Consequences of Chornobyl Catastrophe
- In office 18 December 2007 – 11 March 2010
- Prime Minister: Yulia Tymoshenko
- Preceded by: Nestor Shufrych
- Succeeded by: Nestor Shufrych

Minister of Industrial policy of Ukraine
- In office 4 February 2005 – 4 August 2006
- Prime Minister: Yulia Tymoshenko; Yuri Yekhanurov
- Preceded by: Oleksandr Neustroev
- Succeeded by: Anatoliy Holovko

Personal details
- Born: January 11, 1963 (age 63) Zboriv, Ukrainian SSR
- Education: Obninsk Institute for Nuclear Power Engineering

Volodymyr Mykolajovych Shandra (Ukrainian: Володимир Миколайович Шандра) is a Ukrainian politician and former Governor of Kyiv Oblast.

== Education ==
Since 1981, he studied at the Faculty of Nuclear Power Plants and equipment for the Moscow Engineering Physics Institute (later — Obninsk Institute for Nuclear Power Engineering), specializing in thermal power engineer. In 2006 he graduated from the National Academy of Management, where he received a master's degree in finance.

PhD in economics. He defended his thesis on technological innovation economy in innovative practice.

== Work Experience ==
1980 — started his career grinder for the production association "Ternopil combine factory".

1987 — after graduation he worked at the Khmelnytskyi Nuclear Power Plant, where he rose from the reactor operator's compartment, a senior engineer with repair and maintenance of equipment of the reactor compartment to the chief engineer of the control reactor.

From 1992 to 2002 works in private sector of economics.

== Politics ==
In 2002, Vladimir Shandra elected deputy of Ukraine under Yushchenko Bloc "Our Ukraine" (No. 39). He was Deputy Chairman of the Verkhovna Rada of Ukraine on Industrial Policy and Entrepreneurship.

In the presidential election of 2004 was led by Khmelnytsky Regional Headquarters coalition "People Power".

From February 2005 to August 2006 served as Minister of Industrial policy of Ukraine.

In 2006–2007 — Advisor to the President of Ukraine. He was Chairman of the NGO "Institute for Social and Economic Development".

In 2006–2008 — member of the supervisory board of the State Savings Bank of Ukraine and the State Export-Import Bank.

In the parliamentary elections of 2007, ran for Parliament Bloc "Our Ukraine — People's Self-Defense" (No. 75). At the head of the electoral re-election headquarters in Khmelnytsky region.

18 December 2007 – 11 March 2010 — Minister of Ukraine of Emergencies and Affairs of Population Protection from the Consequences of Chornobyl Catastrophe (appointed by the Supreme Council of Ukraine No. 10-VI of 18 December 2007 and dismissed by the Verkhovna Rada of Ukraine on 11 March 2010 number 1965-VI).

He was a member of the party "People's Union "Our Ukraine".

On 2 March 2014 Acting President Oleksandr Turchynov appointed Shandra Governor of Kyiv Oblast. Shandra resigned from this post on 27 January 2016. Seven days later he was appointed as advisor to President Petro Poroshenko.

== Family ==
Wife Antonina Єvgenіvna (1960).

He has two sons — Andrew (1980) and Anton (1994).

== Awards and titles ==
A civil servant rank 1 (October 2006). He was awarded the Order of Merit III degree (September 2008).
