= Natalia Greshchuk =

- Наталія Грещук
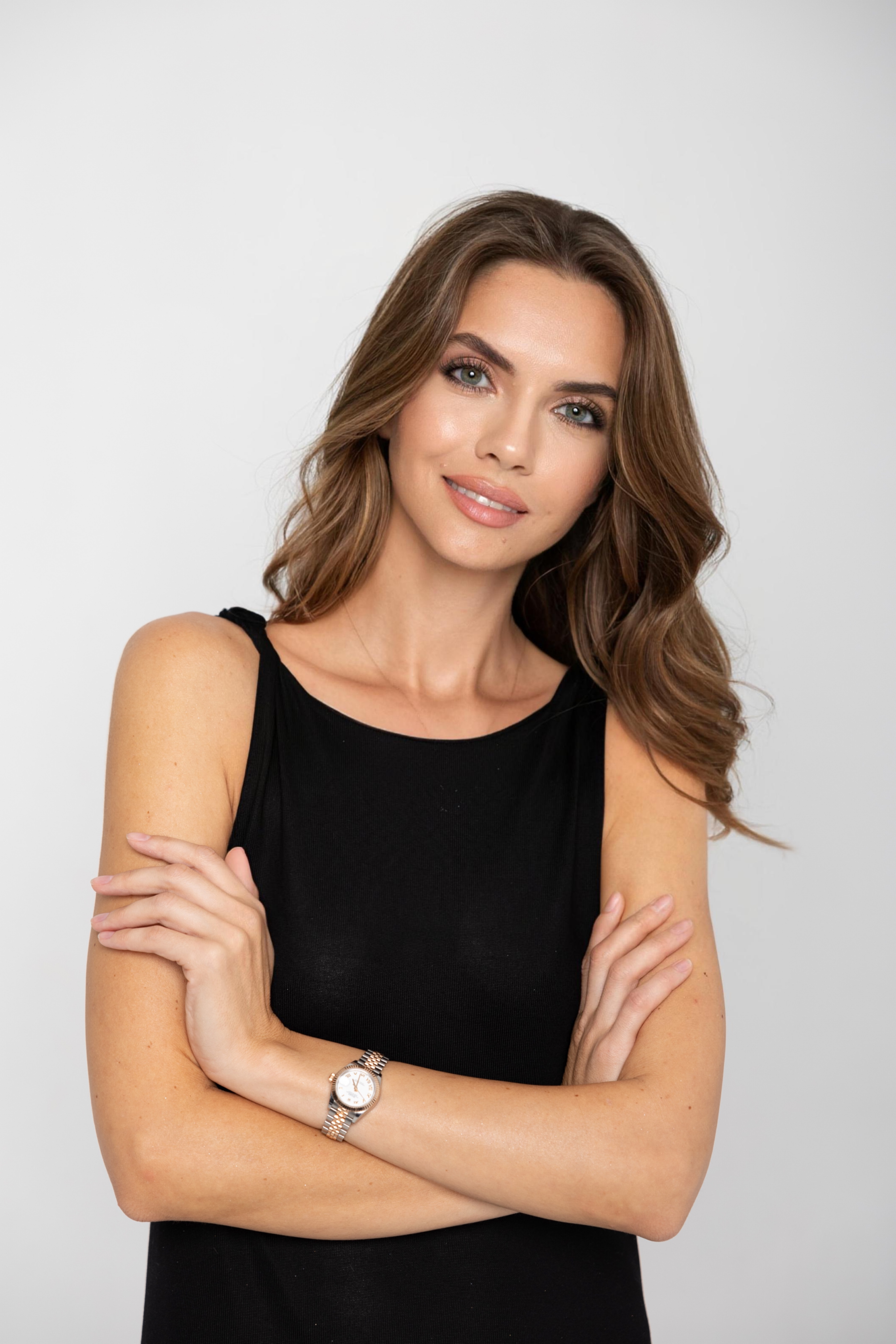
- Born: November 19, 1985 (age 40); Budapest, Hungary
- Education: Ivano-Frankivsk National Medical University, Kyiv-Mohyla Academy
- Occupations: Entrepreneur, Coach

Natalia Greshchuk (Ukrainian: Наталія Грещук, born November 19, 1985, Budapest) is a Ukrainian entrepreneur, coach, founder of the "Mind Port" brand and app, focusing on mental health and personal development, and the "Obrani" retreats. She is also the author of the book Laws of a New Era.

== Early life and education ==
Natalia Greshchuk was born on November 19, 1985, in Budapest, Hungary. Her father was a lieutenant colonel in the Ukrainian Air Force, and her mother was a healthcare worker. She completed her secondary education in Ivano-Frankivsk and graduated from Ivano-Frankivsk National Medical University in 2007 with a degree in dentistry. In 2021, she earned accreditation as a professional coach from the International Coaching Federation (ICF) through the International University of Coaching Development.

== Career ==
After receiving a medical education, Natalia Greshchuk worked in private practice as a dentist and also provided individual coaching sessions. In 2018, at the age of 33, she reported having a transformative personal experience during meditation on the terrace of her home. She later described it as a pivotal moment that influenced her decision to focus on personal development and mindfulness. Following this, she shifted her professional path toward guiding others in self-discovery and mental well-being.

Natalia Greshchuk is the founder of the "Mind Port" brand and app, focusing on mental health and personal development. She also founded the retreat program "Obrani," and authored the book Laws of a New Era, where she explores personal development as a means to navigate modern challenges, emphasizing self-awareness, emotional intelligence, and adaptability.

In 2024, she established the "Natalia Greshchuk Charitable Foundation," focusing on assisting veterans with PTSD by providing opportunities for treatment abroad, including in Spain.
