= Anatolii Prysiazhniuk =

Ukrainian politician

- Анатолій Присяжнюк
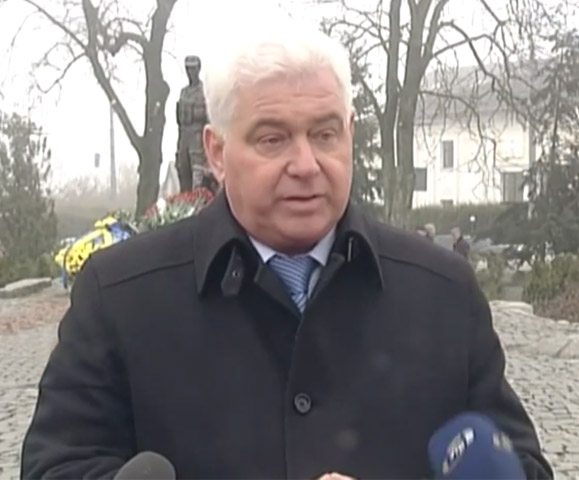
- Prysiazhniuk in February 2014

Governor of Kyiv Oblast
- In office 19 March 2010 – 2 March 2014
- President: Viktor Yanukovych
- Preceded by: Viktor Vakarash
- Succeeded by: Volodymyr Shandra

Personal details
- Born: Anatolii Yosypovych Prysiazhniuk; July 15, 1953 (age 73) Haisyn Raion, Vinnytsia Oblast, Ukrainian SSR
- Party: Party of Regions
- Children: Oleksandr Prysiazhniuk
- Education: Kamianets-Podilskyi Agricultural Institute (1980); Ukrainian Academy of Internal Affairs
- Occupation: Politician, administrator

Anatolii Prysiazhniuk (Ukrainian: Анатолій Йосипович Присяжнюк; born 15 July 1953, Kuna, Haisyn Raion) is a Ukrainian politician, chief of militsiya and general of state security.

Prysiazhniuk was born on July 15, 1953, in Kuna Haisyn Raion of Vinnytsia Oblast. In 1980, graduated from Kamyanets-Podilskyi Agricultural Institute, specializing in mechanization of agriculture, and qualified engineer-mechanics, In 1993, he graduated from the Ukrainian Academy of Internal Affairs specializing in jurisprudence.

== Biography ==
1972 — Accountant of a mechanized detachment of the Haisyn Raion association “Agricultural machinery” of the Vinnytsia Oblast.

Since 1972 to 1974 — service in the military benches of the USSR.

Since 1974 — engineer-technologist of the Haisyn Raion association “Agricultural machinery” of the Vinnytsia Oblast.

From 1974 to 1975 — a listener of the Faculty of Kamyanets-Podilsky Agricultural Institute.

Since September 1975 to August 1980 — student of the Kamyanets-Podilsky Agricultural Institute.

Since 1980 to 1981 — assistant of the department of repair of machines and technologies of metal Kamyanets-Podilsky Agricultural Institute.

Since October 1982 to August 1983 — State Inspector of Internal Affairs of the Simferopol District Executive Committee of the Crimean Oblast, Simferopol.

From 1983 to 1993, he held offices starting from the inspector of the Patrol Service of the GAI Directorate of the Crimean Executive Committee Internal Affairs Directorate, Simferopol to the Deputy Chief of the GAI Directorate of the Crimea Internal Affairs Directorate.

From 1993 to 2001 — Deputy Head of the Main Directorate of the Ministry of Internal Affairs of Ukraine in the Autonomous Republic of Crimea, Simferopol (until 1994 as the Deputy Minister of Internal Affairs of Crimea, Simferopol).

Since 2001 to 2003 — Chief of the Ministry of Internal Affairs of Ukraine in Poltava Oblast.

Since 2003, in May 2005 — Deputy Minister of Internal Affairs of Ukraine — Head of Police Public Security, Kyiv.

After the service in the Ministry of Internal Affairs took office:

Deputy Chairman of the Council of Ministers of the Autonomous Republic of Crimea.

Since September 2006, in November 2009 — Chairman of the Board of Dac "Chornomornaftogaz".

From November 10, 2009 to March 2010 — Deputy Head of the Security Service of Ukraine.

From March 19, 2010 to March 2, 2014 — Head of the Kyiv Regional State Administration.

== Rewards ==
- 2000 — Order “For Merits” of the III degree.
- 2002 — Honorary title “Honored Lawyer of Ukraine”.
- 2003 — Honorary Diploma of the Cabinet of Ministers of Ukraine.
- Thanks to the President of Ukraine.
- 2008 — honorary title “Honored Worker of Industry of the Autonomous Republic of Crimea”.
- Thanks to the permanent representative of the President of Ukraine in the Autonomous Republic of Crimea.
- 2009 — Order “For Merit” II degree.
- July 15, 2013 — Order “For Merit” and Art. — for a significant personal contribution to state construction, socio-economic development of the Kyiv region, many years of conscientious labor and high professionalism.

== Political activity ==
MP of the Verkhovna Rada of the Autonomous Republic of Crimea convocation of 1998-2002.

Since 2006 — a deputy of the Verkhovna Rada of the Autonomous Republic of Crimea of the Fifth convocation.
