= Badge "For the Merit to the City" =

Order of Merit to the City
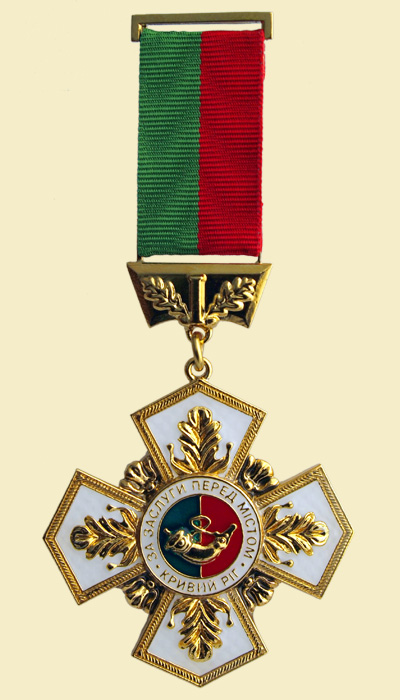
- Type: 3 grade orders
- Awarded for: given to citizens for outstanding achievements in economics, science, culture, military or political spheres of activity
- Presented by: Kryvyi Rih city
- Eligibility: any individual
- Status: issued
- First award: 24 October 2006

Highlights
- Total: 196
- Ribbon of the Badge of Merit

The Badge "For the Merit to the City" (Ukrainian: Нагрудний знак «За заслуги перед мiстом») first, second or third class, is the award of Kryvyi Rih city, Ukraine, given to individuals for outstanding achievements in economics, science, culture, military or political spheres of activity. It was established by mayor Yuri Lyubonenko in October 2006. There are 3 grades, the highest being the first grade honours.

== Medals and ribbons of the badge ==
First Class	Second Class	Third Class
Ribbon
