= Industry in Ukraine =

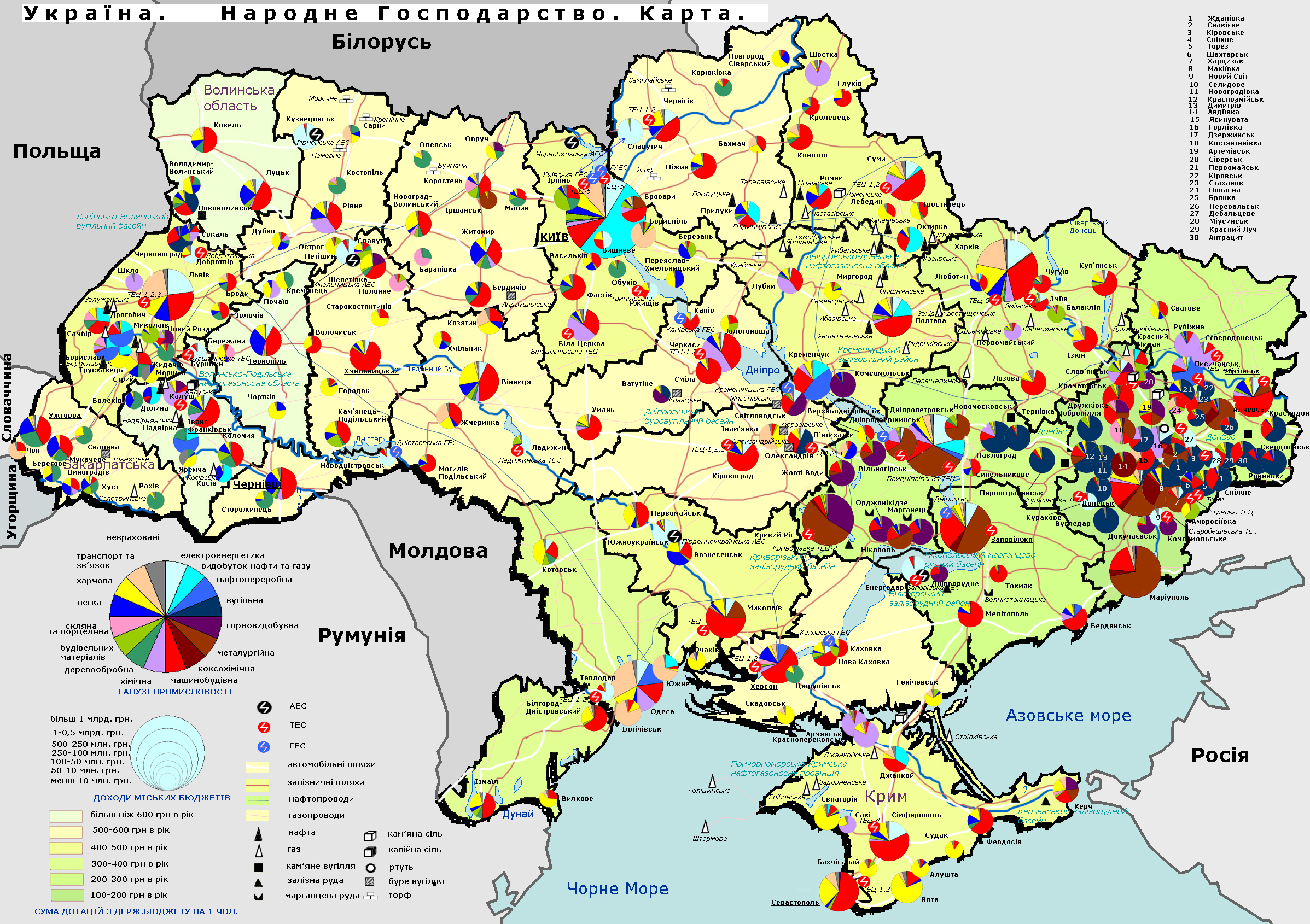
A map of the Ukrainian economy

Industry in Ukraine has a strong material and technical base. The value of fixed assets is 644,767 million ₴ (as of 2007), which is almost 2.3 times more than the value of fixed assets in 2000. The complex employs more than 3.6 million workers, who together brought in industrial profits of 43,700.9 million ₴ (2007), which is 5 times more than in 2001.

== Overview ==
In the industry there are approximately 18% of the employed population of Ukraine (2008). Industry has created approximately 26% of GDP (2012). In the structure of industry, the highest share is occupied by ferrous metallurgy, mechanical engineering, electricity, chemical, and food industries.

As of 2010, 66.3% of industrial output was accounted for by manufacturing, 22.7% by electricity and 11% by mining.

The industry is dominated by the third and fourth technological systems. Their share in industrial production is 95%. The basis of these systems are metallurgical, chemical, light industry, fuel and energy complex, and most branches of mechanical engineering. The share of the fifth and sixth technological systems does not exceed 5%. The basis of these systems is the electronics industry, computing, fiber-optic technology, software, telecommunications, robotics, information services, and biotechnology.

Although industrial enterprises receive significant profits, the profitability of products for 2003-2010 does not exceed 3-6%. Of the 55,000 industrial enterprises, more than 18,000 (33%) are unprofitable. Another negative side is the reduction in the number of employees in the complex. In 2001-2007 their number decreased by 14%.

The share of industrial exports in gross domestic product is about 40%, but its structure is unsatisfactory due to the predominance of the raw material component, which exceeds 60%. The production of high-tech and science-intensive industries in total is 15%.

In the structure of Ukrainian industry, a large share is occupied by heavy industry, especially mechanical engineering, ferrous metallurgy, and coal industry.

Heavy industry forms more than 80% of the total value of sold industrial products, including mechanical engineering which accounts for 12-14%.

== See also ==
- Ukraine
- Ministry of Industrial Policy (Ukraine)
- Military–industrial complex
- Economy of Ukraine
