= Ministry of Industrial Policy (Ukraine) =

Government ministry of Ukraine, 1996–2014

Ministry of Industrial Policy Ukraine
- Міністерство промислової політики України
- Coat of arms of Ukraine

Agency overview
- Jurisdiction: Ukraine
- Headquarters: Kyiv
- Parent agency: Cabinet of Ministers
- Website: Official website

The Ministry of Industrial Policy of Ukraine (Ukrainian: Міністерство промислової політики України) is a former government ministry of Ukraine; it was the main body in the system of central bodies of the executive power. It was created from the former Ministry of Economy and initially was created as Ministry of Machinebuilding, Military-Industrial Complex and Conversion in 1996 and merged with the Ministry of Economic Development and Trade in March 2014 with headquarters in Kyiv.

== Sectors of industry ==
- General machinebuilding
- Metallurgy
- Chemical sector
- Light and Woodprocessing Industry
- Radio-electronic sector and instrument production
- Non-ferrous metallurgy and secondary metals
- Machinebuilding (APK; Ministry of Agrarian Policy)
- Defense Industrial Complex

== History ==
- Ministry of Machinebuilding, Military-Industrial Complex and Conversion: 1996 - 1997
- Ministry of Industrial Policy: 1997–2000
- State Committee of Industrial Policy: 2000–2001 (partially responsible to Minister of Economy)
- Ministry of Industrial Policy: 2001–2011
- State Agency in Management of State Corporation Rights and Property: 2011–present (some authority)
- Ministry of Economical Development and Trade: 2011–present (merged)
- Ministry of Industrial Policy

== List of ministers of industrial policy ==
Name of Ministry	Name of minister	Term of Office	
Name of Ministry	Name of minister	Start	End
State Ministry on issues of Industrial Policy / Fuel and Energy Complex	Anatoliy Minchenko	September 11, 1996	July 30, 1997

Name of Ministry	Name of minister	Term of Office	
Name of Ministry	Name of minister	Start	End
Ministry of Machinebuilding, Military-Industrial Complex and Conversion	Viktor Antonov	May 1991	May 1993
Ministry of Machinebuilding, Military-Industrial Complex and Conversion	????	May 1993	July 1994
Ministry of Machinebuilding, Military-Industrial Complex and Conversion	Viktor Petrov	July 1994	August 1995

Name of Ministry	Name of minister	Term of Office	
Name of Ministry	Name of minister	Start	End
State Ministry of Industry and Transport	Viktor Hladush	June 5, 1991	February 29, 1992
Ministry of Industry	Viktor Hladush	February 29, 1992	September 28, 1992
Ministry of Industry	Mykhailo Pavlovskyi	September 28, 1992	October 27, 1992
Ministry of Industry	Anatoliy Holubchenko	October 27, 1992	July 3, 1995
Ministry of Industry	Valeriy Mazur	July 3, 1995	July 25, 1997
Ministry of Industrial Policy	Vasiliy Guryeyev	July 25, 1997	April 24, 2002
Ministry of Industrial Policy	Anatoliy Myalitsa	June 10, 2002	January 11, 2004
Ministry of Industrial Policy	Oleksandr Neustroyev	January 11, 2004	February 3, 2005
Ministry of Industrial Policy	Volodymyr Shandra	February 4, 2005	August 4, 2006
Ministry of Industrial Policy	Anatoliy Holovko	August 4, 2006	December 18, 2007
Ministry of Industrial Policy	Volodymyr Novytsky	December 18, 2007	March 11, 2010
Ministry of Industrial Policy	Dmytro Kolyesnikov	March 11, 2010	December 9, 2010
Ministry of Industrial Policy	Mykhailo Korolenko	February 5, 2013	February 27, 2014

== See also ==
- Cabinet of Ministers of Ukraine
- Ministry of Strategic Industries of Ukraine
- Ministry of Energy (Ukraine)
- Ukraine's industrial complex
