= Oleh Uruskyi =

Ukrainian politician (born 1963)

Oleh Urusky
- Олег Уруський
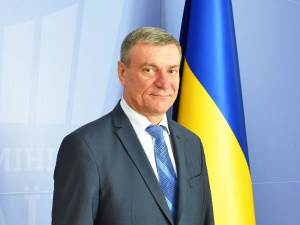
- Uruskyi in 2020

First Deputy Prime Minister of Ukraine
- In office 16 July 2020 – 3 November 2021
- President: Volodymyr Zelenskyy
- Prime Minister: Denys Shmyhal

Minister of Strategic Industries
- In office 16 July 2020 – 3 November 2021
- President: Volodymyr Zelenskyy
- Prime Minister: Denys Shmyhal
- Preceded by: Position established
- Succeeded by: Pavlo Riabikin

Personal details
- Born: 13 April 1963 (age 63) Chortkiv, Ukrainian SSR, Soviet Union (now Ukraine)
- Party: Independent

Oleh Semenovych Urusky (Ukrainian: Олег Семенович Уруський, IPA: [oˈlɛɦ seˈmɛnowɪtʃ ʊˈrusʲkɪj]; born 13 April 1963) is a Ukrainian politician. From 16 July 2020 to 3 November 2021 he was First Vice Prime Minister of Ukraine in the Shmyhal Government, and also Minister of Strategic Industries of Ukraine, the inaugural holder of the post.

In 2015, he was Director General of the State Space Agency of Ukraine.

He is a Director of the engineering company Prohrestekh-Ukraine.

== Biography ==
He was born on 13 April 1963 in Chortkiv, which was then part of the Ukrainian SSR in the Soviet Union. In 1985, he graduated from the Kyiv Military Aviation Engineering Academy and also later in 1997 was recognized as a Doctor of Sciences. After graduating in 1985, he worked within his alma mater as an engineer, eventually rising to Head of Department until the collapse of the Soviet Union.

In 1991, after its collapse, he worked within the Center for Operational‑Strategic Studies, which is a division of the General Staff of the Armed Forces of Ukraine, as a researcher. In 1992 he started working for the State Space Agency of Ukraine as Head of Directorate. In 1996-2000 he headed the management of the National Security and Defense Council of Ukraine.

In 2003-2005 Urusky headed the department in the Secretariat of Cabinet of Ministers (Ukraine). Afterwords, he was briefly First Deputy Minister of the Ministry of Industrial Policy before working as a professor of the National Aerospace University – Kharkiv Aviation Institute.

In 2007, he returned to the public sphere when he became First Deputy General Director of the R&D Center "Rotor", before in 2008 being appointed First Deputy General Director of a state aviation company, and then from 2011 to 2014 he was Vice President of the Scientific‑Technological Institute of Translation. Uruskyi became Deputy General Director of the Ukrainian Defense Industry in 2014, before being promoted to Head of the State Space Agency of Ukraine in 2015.
