= Oleksandr Kamyshin =

Ukrainian politician (born 1984)

- Олександр Камишін
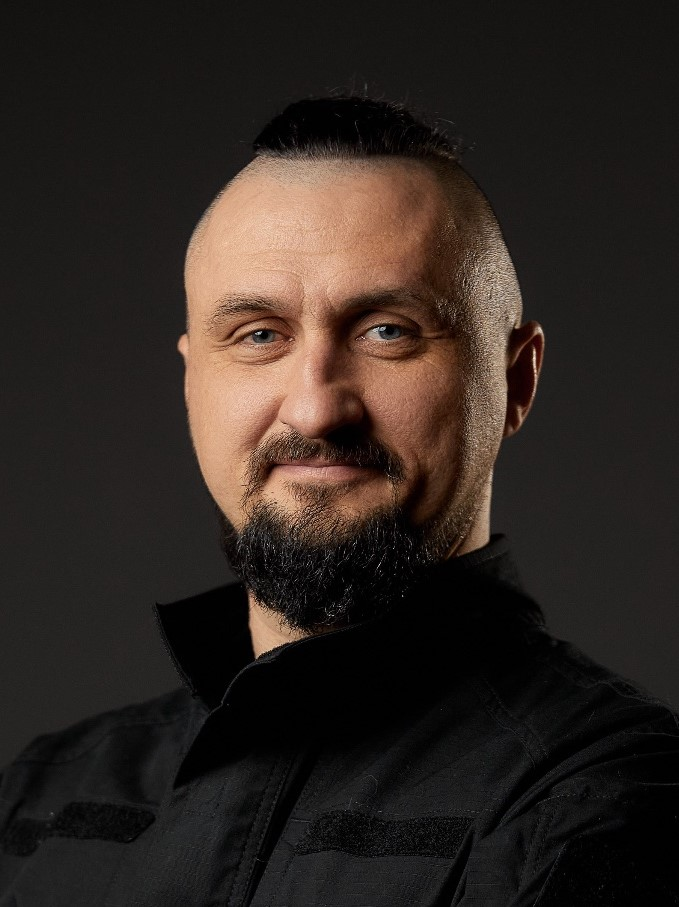
- Kamyshin in 2023

Minister of Strategic Industries
- In office 21 March 2023 – 4 September 2024
- President: Volodymyr Zelenskyy
- Prime Minister: Denys Shmyhal
- Preceded by: Pavlo Riabikin
- Succeeded by: Herman Smetanin

CEO of Ukrainian Railways
- In office 11 August 2021 (initially as acting CEO) – 28 February 2023
- Preceded by: Volodymyr Zhmak
- Succeeded by: Yevhen Lyashchenko

Personal details
- Born: 2 July 1984 (age 42) Kyiv, Ukrainian SSR, USSR
- Children: 2
- Education: Igor Sikorsky Kyiv Polytechnic Institute
- Known for: Chairman of Ukrainian Railways during the 2022 Russian invasion of Ukraine

Oleksandr Mykolaiovych Kamyshin (Ukrainian: Олександр Миколайович Камишін; born 2 July 1984) is a former Ukrainian politician who was the Minister of Strategic Industries from 21 March 2023 to 4 September 2024. He was the CEO of state-owned Ukrainian Railways from August 2021 to late February 2023.

== Biography ==
Oleksandr Kamyshin was born on 2 July 1984 in Kyiv in the Ukrainian SSR, Soviet Union. He studied finance at the Igor Sikorsky Kyiv Polytechnic Institute from 2001 to 2007. In 2006 he started his professional career as an auditor at KPMG; he left the company in 2008. From 2008 to 2012 he was the General Director of Kyiv Motorcycle Plant, while also working for the investment management company Dragon Capital. In 2012 Kamyshin became an investment manager at SCM Holdings.

Kamyshin left SCM in 2019. In January 2020 Kamyshin became a managing partner of Fortior Capital.

On 11 August 2021 Kamyshin was appointed acting CEO of state-owned Ukrainian Railways. At the time he was advisor to Minister of Infrastructure of Ukraine Oleksandr Kubrakov. He was appointed permanent CEO in March 2022. Kamyshin gained world-wide recognition for keeping Ukrainian trains working during the 2022 Russian invasion of Ukraine. Kamyshin resigned as CEO late February 2023 to become the head of the European integration office of Ukrainian Railways. On 3 March 2023 he was appointed as a freelance Advisor to President of Ukraine Volodymyr Zelenskyy.

On 20 March 2023, the Ukrainian parliament received Prime Minister Denys Shmyhal's submissions on the appointment of Kamyshin as Minister of Strategic Industries. On 21 March 2023 he was appointed to this post.

On 4 September 2024, it was announced that Kamyshin had resigned his post as Minister of Strategic Industries.

On 26 September 2024 the Cabinet of Ministers of Ukraine appointed Kamyshin as a member of the Supervisory Board of JSC “Ukrzaliznytsia”.

== Activities as Minister for Strategic Industries of Ukraine ==
Reporting on his first 100 days in office, Oleksandr Kamyshin highlighted a significant achievement, noting that in June 2023 alone, the Ukrainian defense industry produced several times more products than in the entire year of 2022.

There is a gradual yet substantial increase in production capacity, with Kamyshyn assembling a team of young progressive leaders in the Ministry of Strategic Industries. He has initiated the reform of Ukroboronprom, transforming it from a state concern into a joint-stock company, and state-owned enterprises are being transitioned into business entities. This restructuring allows for joint ventures with foreign companies.

The Minister is actively pursuing a policy of supporting the private sector in the defense industry, emphasizing the need to avoid a state monopoly.

Kamyshin stated in an interview with The Guardian, "In 2021, 80% of the sector was state-owned; now it is about 50/50. In five years, it should be 80/20 in favor of the private sector."

According to him, Ukraine is currently building the "Arsenal of the Free World."

The production of artillery and mortar shells is on the rise, and there is a noticeable increase in the number of private UAV manufacturers. In the fall, there were approximately 200 such manufacturers, and by October, there was a hundredfold increase in drone production.

As of November, Kamyshin reports a threefold increase in the production of military products compared to 2022 and predicts a sixfold growth in 2024. The Ukrainian defense industry now employs more than 300 thousand people and involves more than 500 companies (data as of October 2023).

=== International cooperation ===
Kamyshin advocates the creation of joint ventures and argues that cooperation with Ukraine is not about charity, but about a mutually beneficial partnership.

September 18–20, 2023. The Ministry of Strategic Industries of Ukraine held the first joint French-Ukrainian defense industry seminar. The organizational partner of the Ministry was the French Association for Defense and Land Security (GICAT). The seminar was attended by more than 35 French and about 80 Ukrainian companies and industry business associations, Defence Tech support clusters, representatives of the Ukrainian defense and security sector, and the diplomatic corps.

On September 22, 2023, in the presence of President of Ukraine Volodymyr Zelenskyy, memoranda of cooperation and development of joint projects were signed between the Ministry of Strategic Industries of Ukraine, the Global Defense Industrial Alliance, the Arizona Defense Industrial Coalition, and the Utah Aerospace and Defense Association. The document establishes cooperation in the implementation of projects in the defense industry and reconstruction. The GDIA is expected to ensure the establishment of ties and development of cooperation between the Ukrainian side and American defense companies interested in locating their production facilities in Ukraine.

On September 29, Kyiv hosted the First International Defense Industries Forum (DFNC1), which brought together 252 companies from more than 30 countries that produce a full range of weapons, military equipment, and defense systems. The forum was jointly organized by three ministries: Ministry of Strategic Industries, Ministry of Defense and Ministry of Foreign Affairs. The key slogan of DFNC1 is "Building the Arsenal of the Free World Together," because freedom needs strength to defend itself against tyranny.

During the Forum, the Ukrainian side signed 20 documents with foreign partners. These include agreements and memorandums on the production of drones, repair and production of armored vehicles and ammunition. The cooperation formats include joint production, technology exchange, and supply of components. An important event of the forum was the creation of the Alliance of Defense Industries, which is open to any manufacturer of weapons and military equipment from around the world. By the time the Forum closed, 38 companies from 19 countries had joined the Alliance of Defense Industries. Within the framework of the Forum, bilateral and multilateral meetings of the state leadership with representatives of Ukraine's partner states and foreign defense companies took place.

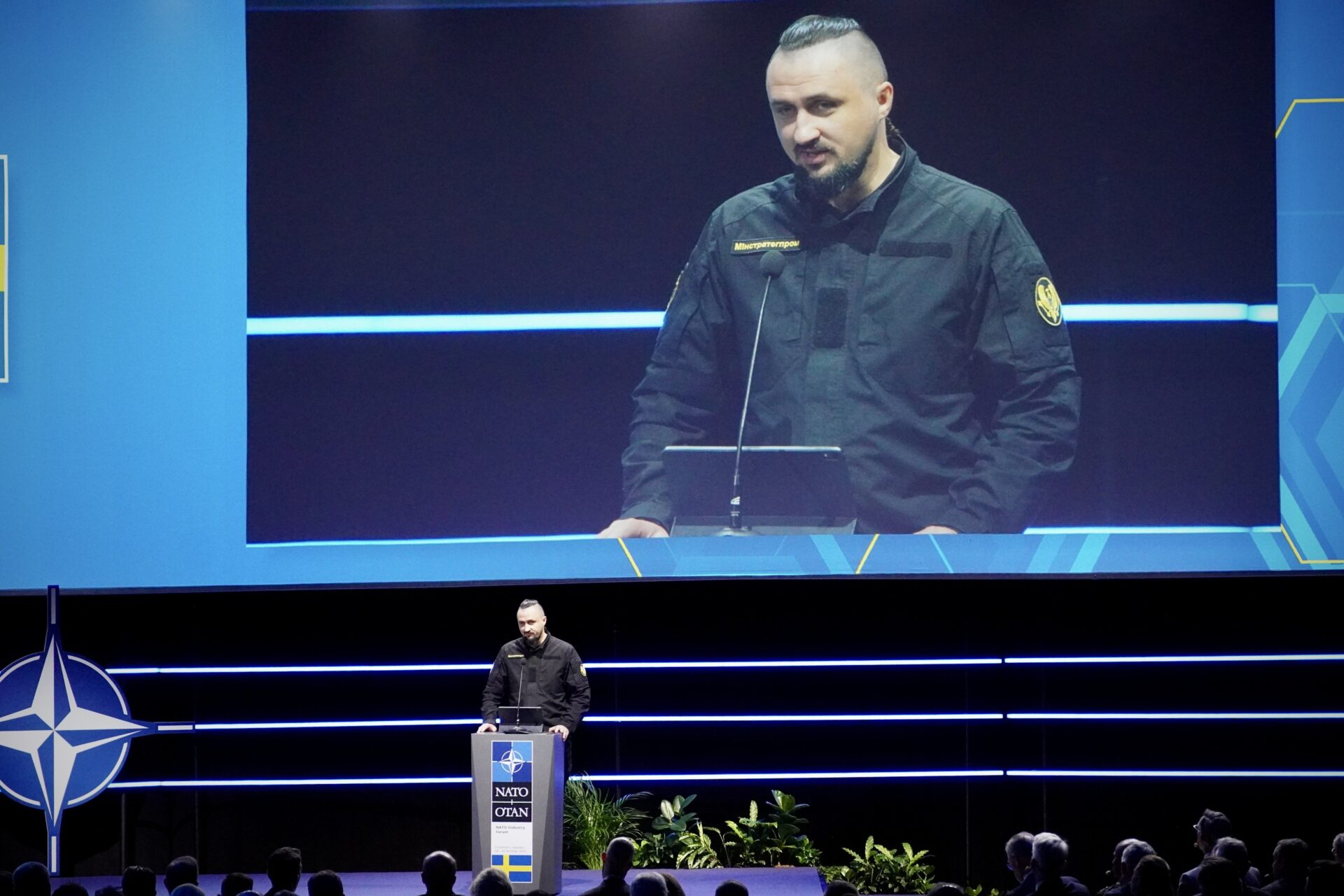
Speech by Oleksandr Kamyshyn at the NATO Industrial Forum (Stockholm, Sweden)

Kamyshyn also attended international events where the topic of Ukraine's defense industry was discussed. On October 25, he attended the annual NATO Industrial Forum in Stockholm. There, he said, in particular, that Ukraine was ready to share its experience with partners and was interested in cooperation in maintenance and repair, research and development, and full-scale production.

On August 30, the international defense manufacturer BAE SYSTEMS opens an office in Ukraine to implement joint projects in the production of weapons

In July 2023, it became known that the Turkish company Baykar had begun construction of a Bayraktar drone manufacturing plant in Ukraine. This was a real construction project, and the signing of documents took several years, with bureaucratic problems and scandals stopping the process several times.

The Ukrainian Defense Industry Joint Stock Company and the German defense concern Rheinmetall formed a joint venture. Rheinmetall UDI LLC (Rheinmetall Ukrainian defense industry LLC), which was established by the leaders of the defense industries of Germany and Ukraine, was registered on October 18. This is the first joint venture established with foreign partners with the participation of UOP. The basis of the cooperation is the maintenance and repair of armored vehicles, which the partners transfer to Ukraine. This cooperation also involves joint production of Rheinmetall products in Ukraine and development of the latest weapons and military equipment on the basis of the newly established enterprise with the participation of Ukrainian and German specialists. Establishing joint ventures with foreign partners is one of the key opportunities that the reform of the state defense industry has opened up for the transformed Ukroboronprom.

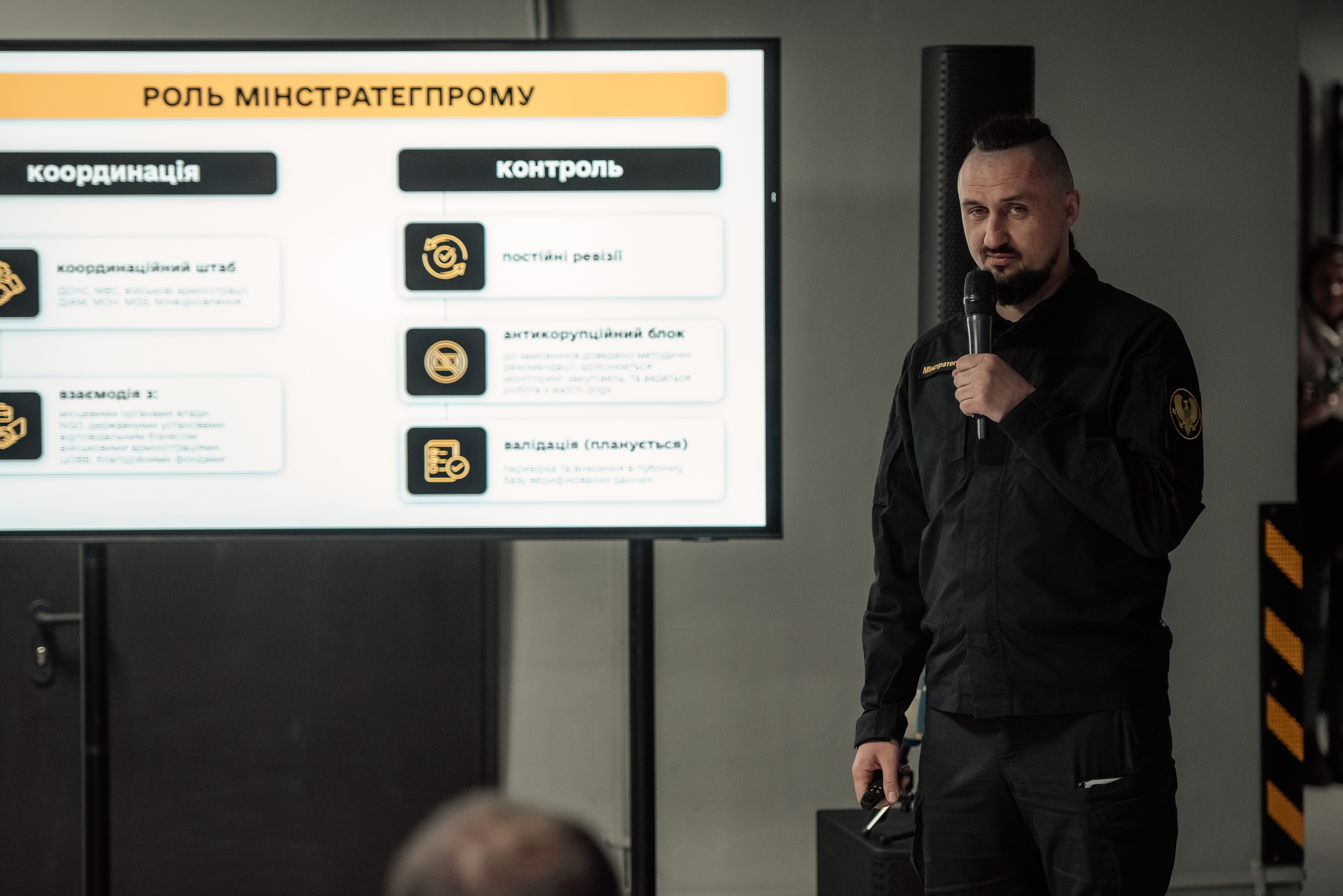
«Iron shelter»: the Ministry of Strategic Industries presented the concept of shelter development in Ukraine

=== Shelters ===
During the presentation of the Iron Shelter concept, Kamyshyn was appointed by the government on June 27 to oversee and coordinate the efforts to bring Ukraine's shelters into proper condition.

The initial audit conducted by the Ministry in June revealed that Ukraine's civil defense shelter fund comprises 61,328 functioning shelters of various types, many of which are in poor condition. In the four months since the initiative began, 2,604 of them have been restored, with an additional 2,956 shelters expected to be repaired by the end of the year, at a cost of UAH 1.4 billion. Funding sources include local budgets, state subventions, donors, and patrons.

On October 19, the Ministry of Strategic Industries of Ukraine organized a presentation for the All-Ukrainian project "Iron Shelter" in one of Kyiv's civilian shelters. The progress of repair work in all regions of Ukraine is now accessible in real-time on the Iron Shelter website, which was unveiled during the presentation.

Additionally, a manual containing guidelines for repairing and arranging shelters of various types was presented. This document marks a significant milestone as the first of its kind in Ukraine, covering a wide range of aspects and establishing uniform standards for shelters across the country.

== Family ==
Kamyshin is married and has two sons.
