= List of ambassadors of Ukraine to Romania =

Ambassador of Ukraine to Romania

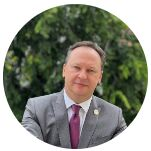
- Incumbent; Ihor Prokopchuk since May 2022
- Nominator: Volodymyr Zelenskyy
- Inaugural holder: Leonity Sandulyak as Ambassador Extraordinary and Plenipotentiary
- Formation: 1992
- Website: Ukraine Embassy - Bucharest

The Ambassador Extraordinary and Plenipotentiary of Ukraine to Romania (Ukrainian: Надзвичайний і Повноважний посол України в Румунії) is the ambassador of Ukraine to Romania. The current ambassador is Ihor Prokopchuk. He assumed the position in May 2022.

The first Ukrainian ambassador to Romania assumed his post in 1992, the same year a Ukrainian embassy opened in Bucharest.

== List of representatives ==
=== Ukrainian People's Republic ===
- 1918—1918 — Oleksandr Sevryuk
- 1918—1918 — Mykola Galagan
- 1918—1918 — Volodyslav Dashkevych-Horbatsky
- 1919—1919 — Yuri Hasenko
- 1919—1923 — Kostiantyn Matsiyevych

=== Ukraine ===
- 1992—1995 — Leontiy Sandulyak
- 1995—1998 — Oleksandr Chaly
- 1998—2000 — Ihor Kharchenko
- 2000—2003 — Anton Buteyko
- 2004—2005 — Teofil Bauer
- 2005—2008 — Yuri Malko
- 2008—2011 — Markiyan Kulyk
- 2012–2016 — Teofil Bauer
- 2017–2020 — Oleksandr Bankov
- 2020–2022 — Paun Rohovei (chargé d'affaires ad interim)
- 2022–present — Ihor Prokopchuk

== See also ==
- Ukrainian Embassy, Bucharest
- Ambassador of Romania to Ukraine
