= Australia–Ukraine relations =

- Australia: Ukraine

Diplomatic mission
- Embassy of Australia, Kyiv: Embassy of Ukraine, Canberra

Envoy
- Ambassador Geoff Bowan: Ambassador Vasyl Myroshnychenko

Diplomatic relations between Australia and Ukraine were established in 1992. Ukraine has had an embassy in Canberra since March 2003 and the Australian Embassy in Kyiv was established in December 2014, however, Australia closed its embassy in Kyiv from February 2022 to January 2025 due to the Russian invasion of Ukraine, maintaining representation from Poland. In December 2024, it was announced that Australia would reopen its embassy in Kyiv in January 2025, and the embassy reopened from 28 January 2025.

== History ==
Early diplomatic representation of Ukraine as part of the Russian Empire in Australia dates back to 1894, when the Ministry of Foreign Affairs of the Russian Empire sent its first permanent consular representatives to Australia, based in Melbourne, and Ukrainians were counted in official statistics as part of the Russian community. The fifth consul-general of Russia to Australia from 1908 to 1910 was Matvei Matveyevich Hedenstrom, a grandson and namesake of the explorer Matvei Gedenschtrom, who was born in 1858 in Odesa and a graduate of Kyiv University in 1882.

Ukraine and Australia have enjoyed official diplomatic relations since 1942 when Australia opened channels with the Soviet Union (which included the Ukrainian Soviet Socialist Republic), although independent relations did not occur until the collapse of the Soviet Union and the establishment of a fully independent Ukraine in late 1991. With the dissolution of the Soviet Union in late 1991, Australia acted to recognise the new states of the Commonwealth of Independent States on 26 December 1991. Formal diplomatic relations between Ukraine and Australia were established on 10 January 1992 by exchanging notes between the Ministry of Foreign Affairs of Ukraine and the Australian Embassy in Moscow, with the Australian Ambassador in Moscow, Cavan Hogue, receiving non-resident accreditation for Ukraine, presenting his credentials to the President of Ukraine, Leonid Kravchuk on 9 March 1992.

In March 1992, Ukraine established an Honorary Consulate in Melbourne (led by Honorary Consul Zina Botte from 1992 to 1996, and then from 1997 to present by her husband Valery (Larry) Botte), followed by a consulate-general in Sydney in May 2000, headed until 2003 by Vasil Grigorovich Korzachenko. A resident embassy in Canberra was established on 14 April 2003. From 1996 to 2003 the Ukrainian Embassy in Jakarta, Indonesia, was accredited to Australia. On 26 October 2017, Ukraine established an Honorary Consulate in Sydney headed by local Ukrainian-Australian businessman, Jaroslav Duma. Duma was awarded the Medal of the Order of Australia (OAM) in the 2006 Birthday honours for "service to the Ukrainian community of New South Wales and to the credit union movement".

Following the unilateral annexation by Russia of the Ukrainian province of Crimea in March 2014, Australia announced sanctions on Russia and supported United Nations General Assembly Resolution 68/262, which affirmed the territorial integrity of Ukraine and underscored the invalidity of the 2014 Crimean referendum.

=== Russo-Ukrainian War ===
==== 2014 ====
In December 2014, Australia established an interim embassy in Kyiv following the 2014 pro-Russian unrest in Ukraine. From 5 November 1992 to the opening of a resident embassy in 2014, Australia maintained a Consulate in Kyiv headed by an Honorary Consul, Serhiy Mykolayovych Berezovenko, a prominent economist and businessman based in the city. The first resident ambassador, Doug Trappett, who was previously Deputy Head of Mission in Rome, had been sent to Kyiv in December 2014 to deal with matters relating to the controversial downing of Malaysia Airlines Flight 17 on 17 July 2014 by Russian-backed separatists in the Donbas region, which led to the deaths of 27 Australian citizens.

==== 2015 ====
Trappett presented his credentials on 14 January 2015.

==== 2016 ====
Although initially considered an interim measure for 12 months, pending the resolution of the conflicts in the region, with the stalemating of various issues and the hardening of Ukrainian-Russian relations, the embassy's term of existence was extended in February 2016 to September 2016. In September 2016, the decision was taken by foreign minister Julie Bishop to extend the embassy's term for a further two years with a resident diplomatic presence noting that it would allow Australia: "to work alongside their Ukrainian partners in close cooperation and further develop bilateral ties between the two countries."

==== 2022 ====
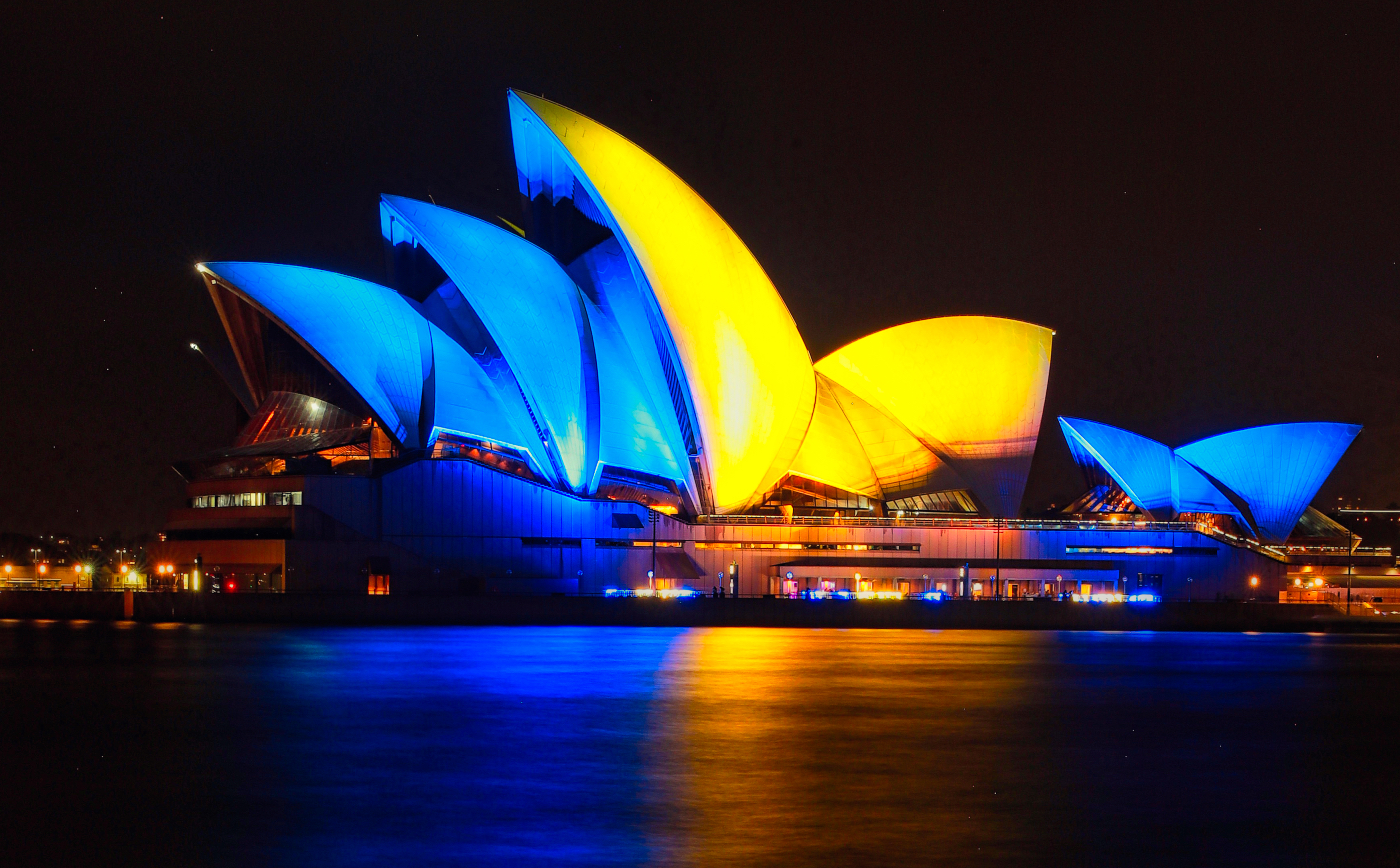
The Sydney Opera House illuminated in the Ukrainian colours in support of Ukraine during the 2022 Russian invasion of Ukraine

On 13 February 2022, amid increasing tensions immediately prior to the Russian invasion of Ukraine, the Australian Embassy was relocated from the capital Kyiv to the western Ukrainian city of Lviv. However, on 22 February 2022, a day before the Russian invasion, Foreign Minister Marise Payne directed that all Australian officials were to leave the country and operate from eastern Poland and Romania.

With the ongoing Russian invasion of Ukraine, Australian Prime Minister Scott Morrison announced further support for Ukraine, with the imposition of new sanctions of Russian individuals and financial institutions, and reiterated the Australian support for the territorial integrity of Ukraine: "Australia joins our partners in condemning Russia's invasion of Ukraine. There is no justification for this aggression, whose cost will be borne by innocent Ukrainians. Vladimir Putin has fabricated a feeble pretext on which to invade. Russia's disinformation and propaganda has convinced no one. We call on Russia to cease its illegal and unprovoked actions, and to stop violating Ukraine's independence. Russia must reverse its breach of international law and of the UN Charter, and withdraw its military from Ukraine. We reiterate our staunch support for Ukraine's independence and territorial integrity – the bedrock principles of a rules-based world order." Additional individuals targeted for sanctions included Vladimir Putin and all members of the Security Council of Russia, alongside an announcement that Australia would contribute lethal and non-lethal military equipment and medical supplies to Ukraine to aid in its defence. In April-June 2022, it was reported that Australia had given Ukraine AUD$225 million in military aid and AUD$65 million in humanitarian aid.

In July 2022, the new Australian Prime Minister, Anthony Albanese, became the first Australian leader to undertake an official visit to Ukraine, announcing an additional support package that included AUD$99.5 million in military assistance.

==== 2024 ====
On 2 August 2024, Australia Post issued a stamp in support of Ukraine.

In December 2024, the amount of aid provided to Ukraine totaled $1.3 billion.

==== 2025 ====
In February 2025 Australia, a key US ally, reaffirmed its support for Ukraine. Australia insisted the Russo-Ukraine war must end on Kyiv’s terms. Defence Minister Richard Marles called Russia the aggressor and stressed the need to uphold the global rules-based order. U.S. President Donald Trump labeled Ukrainian President Volodymyr Zelenskiy a "dictator" and urged him to secure peace quickly, claiming Ukraine was responsible for Russia’s 2022 invasion. His remarks alarmed U.S. allies. Australia’s opposition leader Peter Dutton rejected Trump's claims, stating Ukraine was not responsible for the war. He emphasized Australia’s unwavering support for Ukraine as a democracy fighting against Russian aggression.

== High level visits and representation ==
- April 1992 – Parliamentary delegation to Russia and Ukraine led by Michael Lee MP.
- November 1992 – Parliamentary delegation to Australia led by the Chairman of the Verkhovna Rada, Ivan Plyushch.
- June–July 2004 – Official visit to Ukraine of a parliamentary delegation led by the Speaker of the Australian House of Representatives, Neil Andrew.
- March 2012 – Visit to Ukraine of the Special Envoy of the Prime Minister of Australia, Angus Houston.
- 22 July – 10 August and 12–14 August 2014 – working visits of Angus Houston, Special Envoy of the Prime Minister of Australia to investigate the crash of flight MH17.
- 24–25 July and 27 July – 1 August 2014 – working visits to Ukraine by the Minister of Foreign Affairs, Julie Bishop.
- 10–12 December 2014 – state visit of the President of Ukraine Petro Poroshenko to Australia.
- 2017 – Visit to Ukraine by the President of the Australian Senate, Stephen Parry.
- 2018 – Visit to Australia by Vice Prime Minister Ivanna Klympush-Tsintsadze, Defence Minister Stepan Poltorak, Internal Affairs Minister Arsen Avakov.
- 31 March 2022 – Official address by video-link by the President of Ukraine, Volodymyr Zelenskyy, to the Parliament of Australia.
- 3 July 2022 – Visit to Ukraine by Australian Prime Minister Anthony Albanese.
- 18 December 2024 – Visit to Ukraine by Minister for Foreign Affairs Penny Wong.

== Economic relations ==
Trade between Australia and Ukraine is modest. Merchandise exports from Australia were valued at $29.8 million in 2017–18 primarily consisted of coal. Ukraine's exports to Australia comprised $47.3 million, mainly vegetable oils and fats.

On 1 April 2016, Australia and Ukraine signed a Nuclear Cooperation Agreement, which would enable Australia to export uranium to Ukraine for power generation. This agreement entered into force in June 2017.

=== Tobacco dispute ===
In 2012, Ukraine began a dispute with Australia within the World Trade Organization (WTO) over the adoption of laws requiring uniform plain packaging of tobacco products. On 28 May 2015, the Ukrainian Ministry of Economic Development sent a notice to the WTO to terminate its participation in the dispute, as Ukrainian manufacturers did not export tobacco products to Australia. On 4 June 2015, the Ministry of Economic Development terminated its dispute with Australia over the unified packaging of tobacco products.

== Migration ==
Ukrainians, then part of the Russian Empire, are known to have been in Australia as early as 1860, although remained a very small community with little, if any, official organisation. A notable early Ukrainian in Australia was explorer, naturalist and ethnographer Nikolai Miklouho-Maclay who visited Australia in the late 19th century and was instrumental in the establishment of a Zoological Field Station at Watson's Bay, Sydney. Ukrainian migration to Australia substantially increased in the post-World War II period, with refugees arriving from 1948 as part of the International Refugee Organization resettlement agreement and on Assisted Passages. Ukraine-born people were first recorded in the 1954 Australian census, with the highest number (4,678) living in Victoria.

In the 2016 Census there were 13,366 Ukraine-born people in Australia, and 46,186 people identifying as being of Ukrainian ancestry. Victoria had the largest number of Ukraine-born citizens at 5,322, followed by New South Wales (4,830), Queensland (1,248) and South Australia (929).

== Resident diplomatic missions ==
- Australia has an embassy in Kyiv, Ukraine, reopened in January 2025.
- Ukraine has an embassy in Canberra.
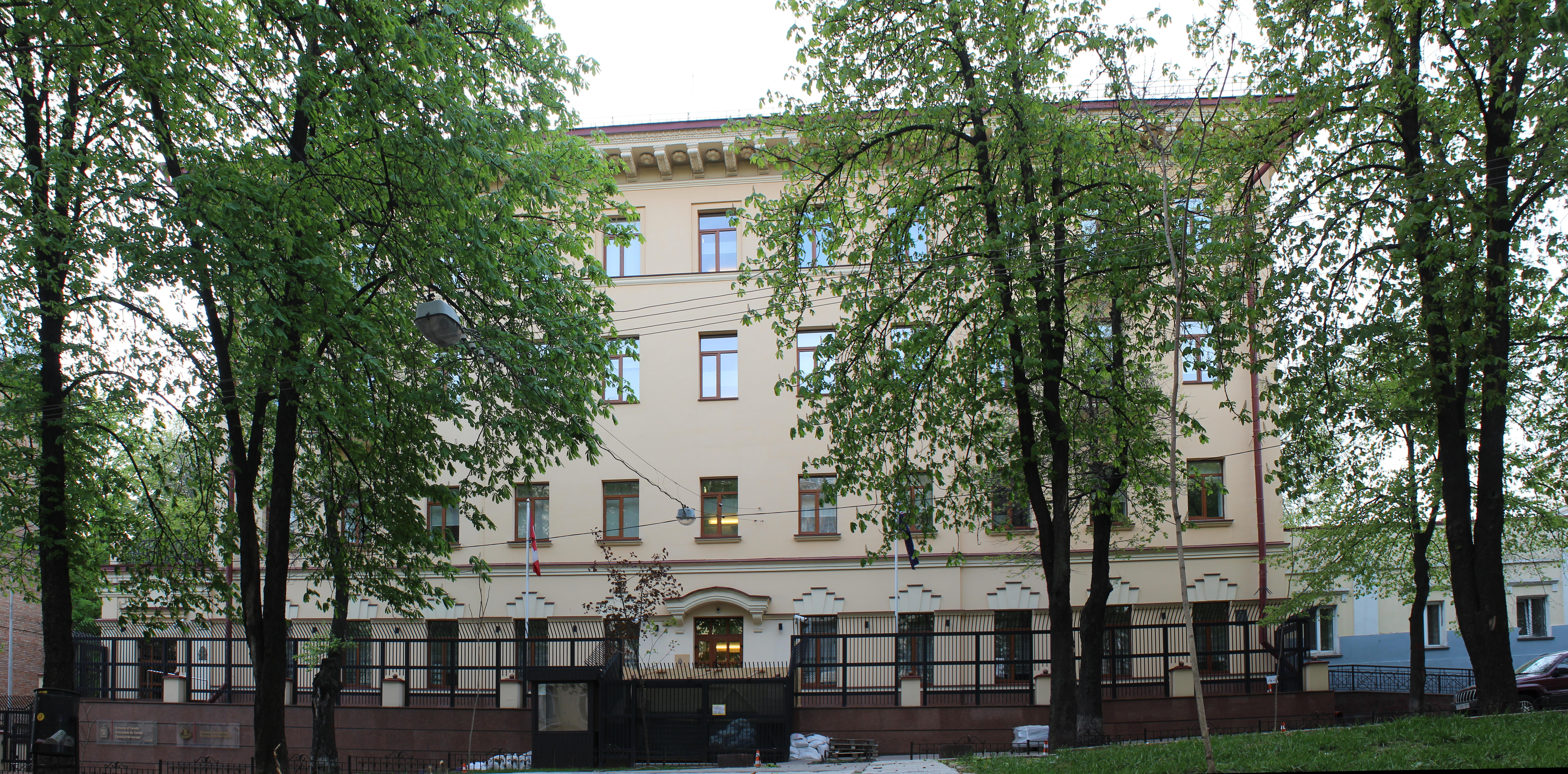
Embassy of Australia in Kyiv

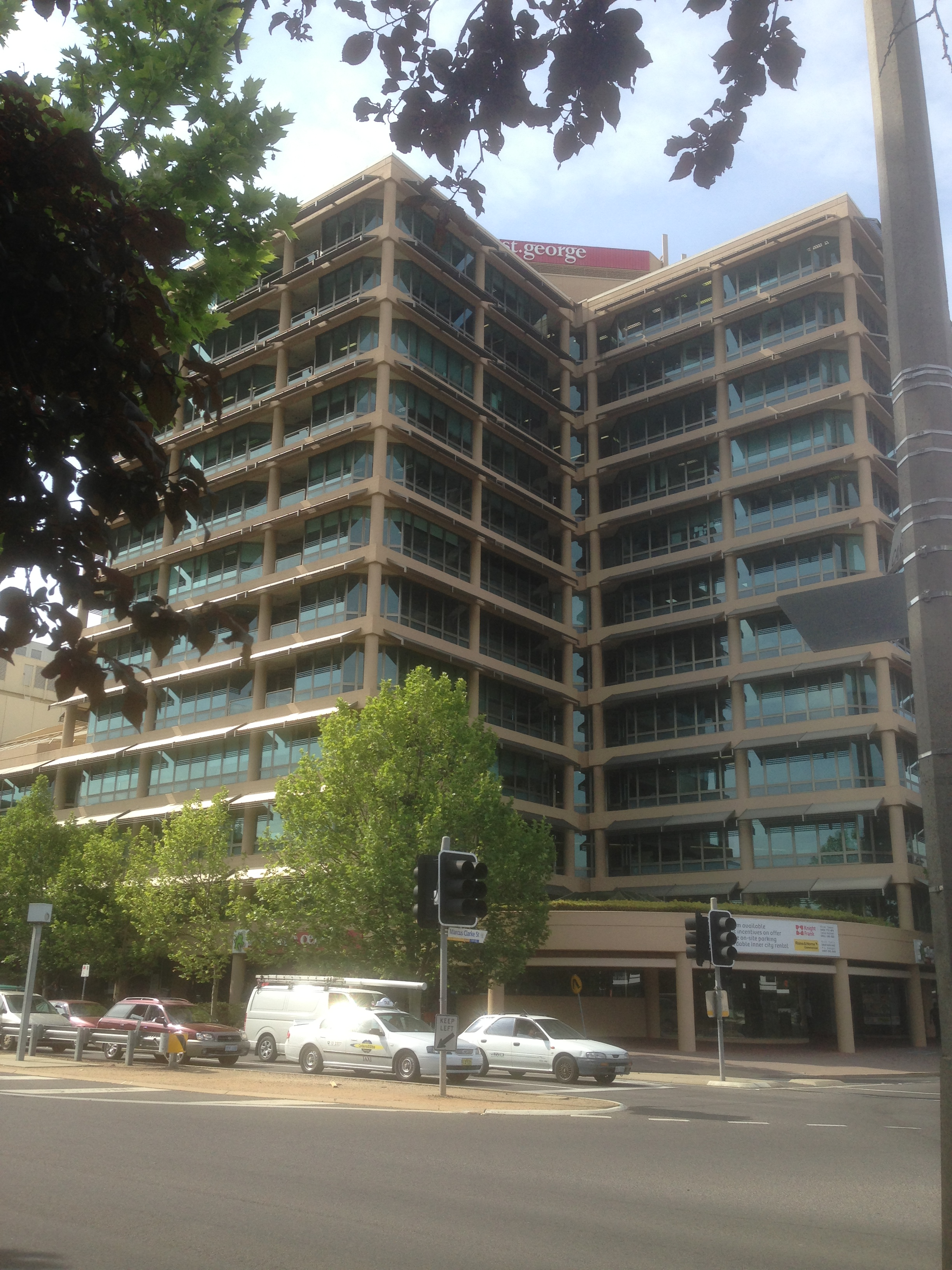
Building hosting the Embassy of Ukraine in Canberra

== See also ==
- Foreign relations of Australia
- Foreign relations of Ukraine
- Ukrainian Australians
