= Kostiantyn Matsiyevych =

Ukrainian statesman and public figure

Kostiantyn Matsiyevych Мацієвич Костянтин Андріанович
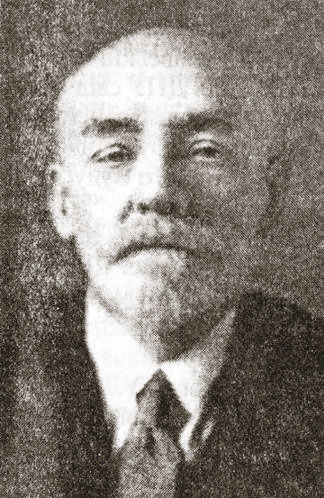

Ambassador of Ukraine to Romania
- In office 1919–1923
- Prime Minister: Andriy Livytskyi
- Preceded by: Yuri Hasenko
- Succeeded by: Leontiy Sandulyak

Minister of Foreign Affairs of the Ukrainian People's Republic
- In office February 13, 1919 – April 9, 1919
- Prime Minister: Serhiy Ostapenko
- Preceded by: Volodymyr Chekhivsky
- Succeeded by: Volodymyr Temnytsky

Personal details
- Born: May 18, 1873 Deremezna, Vasilkovsky Uyezd, Kiev Governorate, Russian Empire
- Died: April 2, 1942 (aged 68)
- Party: Prague
- Education: Institute of Agriculture and Forestry in Pulawy

Kostiantyn Matsiyevych (Ukrainian: Костянтин Андріанович Мацієвич) (May 18, 1873 in Deremezna, Vasilkovsky Uyezd, Kiev Governorate – April 2, 1942 in Prague) was a Ukrainian statesman and public figure, scientist, agrarian and diplomat. He was the Minister of Foreign Affairs of the Ukrainian People's Republic (1919).

== Professional career and experience ==
He graduated from the Institute of Agriculture and Forestry in Pulawy (1899). He worked then in societies farmhouses of Poltava and Kharkiv provinces, was an agronomist of Saratov regional council. In Kharkiv he edited the magazines Farmers, Agronomy Journal and a newspaper of Agriculture (1907-1915). He was a member of the Ukrainian Radical Democratic Party and the Society of Ukrainian Progressives.

After the February Revolution and the overthrow of the tsarist regime he was elected (April 7, 1917) to the Central Committee of the Ukrainian Radical Democratic Party, transformed in September 1917 in the Ukrainian Party of Socialists-Federalists. He represented the party in the Ukrainian Central Rada and the Small Rada. From August 8, 1917 he was the Deputy General Secretary of Land (Deputy Minister), at this position he was one of the authors of the agrarian reform of the Central Council of Ukraine. Since he did not agree with the concept of socialization of land, he resigned on December 19, 1917.

During the times of Ukrainian People's Republic he worked in the Kiev province. He was a member of the Ukrainian delegation at the peace conference between Soviet Ukraine and Russia (May–October 1918) and the Committee to negotiate trade agreements. In January–February 1919 he was a member of the Ukrainian People's Republic delegation negotiating with the Entente powers. From February 13 to April 9, 1919 he was the Minister of Foreign Affairs of the Ukrainian People's Republic, in the office of Serhiy Ostapenko. In the years 1919-1923 he was a Member of the Diplomatic Mission of the Ukrainian People's Republic in Romania.

In 1923 he emigrated to Czechoslovakia, he was a professor of the Ukrainian Academy of Commerce in Poděbrady. Since 1936 he was the President of the Ukrainian Scientific Society and Ukrainian Diplomatic Club in Prague.
