= Ukrainians =

East Slavic ethnic group

Українці

Total population
- c. 46 million

Regions with significant populations
- Ukraine 37,541,700 (2001)
- Russia: 1,864,000 (2023)
- Poland: 1,651,918 (2023)
- Canada: 1,359,655 (2016)
- United States: 1,258,979 (2023)
- Germany: 1,125,000 (2023)
- Brazil: 600,000–1,500,000 (2015)
- Czech Republic: 636,282 (2023)
- Kazakhstan: 387,000 (2021)
- Italy: 347,183 (2023)
- Argentina: 305,000 (2007)
- Romania: 251,923 (2023)
- Slovakia: 228,637 (2023)
- Moldova: 181,035 (2014)
- Belarus: 159,656 (2019)
- Uzbekistan: 124,602 (2015)
- Netherlands: 115,840 (2024)
- Spain: 111,726 (2020)
- France: 106,697 (2017)
- Turkey: 95,000 (2022)
- Israel: 30,000–90,000 (2016)
- Latvia: 50,699 (2018)
- Portugal: 45,051 (2015)
- Australia: 38,791 (2014)
- Greece: 32,000 (2016)
- United Kingdom: 23,414 (2015)
- Estonia: 23,183 (2017)
- Georgia: 22,263 (2015)
- Paraguay: 12,000–40,000 (2014)
- Azerbaijan: 21,509 (2009)
- Kyrgyzstan: 12,691 (2016)
- Lithuania: 12,248 (2015)
- Uruguay: 10,000–15,000 (1990)
- Denmark: 12,144 (2018)
- Austria: 12,000 (2016)
- United Arab Emirates: 11,145 (2017)
- Sweden: 11,069 (2019)
- Hungary: 10,996 (2016)
- Switzerland: 6,681 (2017)
- Finland: 5,000 (2016)
- Jordan: 5,000 (2016)

Languages
- Ukrainian, Ukrainian Sign Language

Religion
- Majority Eastern Orthodoxy with Catholicism (Ukrainian Greek Catholicism and Latin Catholicism) minority

Ukrainians (Ukrainian: українці, romanised: ukraintsi, pronounced [ʊkrɐˈjin⁽ʲ⁾ts⁽ʲ⁾i]) are an East Slavic ethnic group native to Ukraine. Their native tongue is Ukrainian, and the majority adhere to Eastern Orthodox Christianity. At around 46 million worldwide, Ukrainians are the second largest Slavic ethnic group after Russians.

Ukrainians have been given various names by foreign rulers, which have included Polish–Lithuanian Commonwealth, the Habsburg monarchy, the Austrian Empire, and then Austria-Hungary. The East Slavic population inhabiting the territories of modern-day Ukraine were known as Ruthenians, referring to the territory of Ruthenia; the Ukrainians living under the Russian Empire were known as Little Russians, named after the territory of Little Russia.

The ethnonym Ukrainian, which was associated with the Cossack Hetmanate, was adopted following the Ukrainian national revival of the late 18th century. The Cossacks are frequently emphasised in modern Ukrainian identity and symbolism, such as in the Ukrainian national anthem. Citizens of Ukraine are also called Ukrainians regardless of ethnicity, and many identify themselves as a civic nation.

== Ethnonym ==
The modern name Ukraintsi (Ukrainians) is derived from Ukraina (Ukraine), a name first documented in the Kievan Chronicle under the year 1187. The terms Ukrainiany (first recorded in the Galician–Volhynian Chronicle under the year 1268 (Note: In the context of a Polish raid on Kholm (modern Chełm), capital city of the Kingdom of Galicia–Volhynia, the Galician–Volhynian Chronicle notes sub anno 1268 (6776): "The Poles began to raid around Kholm (...) but they did not take anything, for [the people] had fled into the city, because the Лѧхове Оукраинѧнѣ" (Liakhove Ukrainianĕ, literally "Polish Ukrainians", "Ukrainian Poles" or "border Poles") "had let them know [that they enemy was coming]".)), Ukrainnyky, and even narod ukrainskyi (the Ukrainian people) were used sporadically before Ukraintsi attained currency under the influence of the writings of Ukrainian activists in Russian-ruled Ukraine in the 19th century. From the 14th to the 16th centuries, the western portions of the European part of what is now known as Russia, plus the territories of northern Ukraine and Belarus (Ruthenia), were largely known as Rus, continuing the tradition of Kievan Rus'. People of these territories were usually called Rus or Rusyns (known as Ruthenians in Western and Central Europe).

The Ukrainian language is, like modern Russian and Belarusian, a descendent of Old East Slavic. In Western and Central Europe it was known by the exonym "Ruthenian". In the 16th and 17th centuries, with the establishment of the Zaporozhian Sich, names of Ukraine and Ukrainian began to be used in Sloboda Ukraine. After the decline of the Zaporozhian Sich and the establishment of Imperial Russian hegemony in Left Bank Ukraine, Ukrainians became more widely known by Russians as "Little Russians", with the majority of Ukrainian elites espousing Little Russian identity and adopting the Russian language, as Ukrainian was outlawed in almost all contexts.

This exonym—regarded now as a humiliating imperialist imposition—did not spread widely among the peasantry, which constituted the majority of the population. Ukrainian peasants still referred to their country as "Ukraine" (a name associated with the Zaporozhian Sich, with the Hetmanate and with their struggle against Poles, Russians, Turks and Crimean Tatars) and to themselves and their language as Ruthenians/Ruthenian.

With the publication of Ivan Kotliarevsky's Eneyida (Aeneid) in 1798, which established the modern Ukrainian language, and with the subsequent Romantic revival of national traditions and culture, the ethnonym Ukrainians and the notion of a Ukrainian language came into more prominence at the beginning of the 19th century and gradually replaced the words "Rusyns" and "Ruthenian(s)". In areas outside the control of the Russian/Soviet state until the mid-20th century (Western Ukraine), Ukrainians were known by their pre-existing names for much longer. The appellation Ukrainians initially came into common usage in Central Ukraine and did not take hold in Galicia and Bukovina until the latter part of the 19th century, in Transcarpathia not until the 1930s, and in the Prešov Region not until the late 1940s.

The modern name Ukraintsi (Ukrainians) derives from Ukraina (Ukraine), a name first documented in 1187. Several scientific theories attempt to explain the etymology of the term. According to the traditional theory, it derives from the Proto-Slavic root *kraj-, which has two meanings—one being the homeland as in "nash rodnoi kraj" (our homeland), and the other being "edge, border"—and originally had the sense of "periphery", "borderland" or "frontier region". According to another theory, the term ukraina should be distinguished from the term okraina: whereas the latter term means "borderland", the former has the meaning of "cut-off piece of land", thus acquiring the connotation of "our land", "land allotted to us".

In the last three centuries, the population of Ukraine experienced periods of polonisation and russification, but preserved a common culture and a sense of common identity.

== Geographic distribution ==
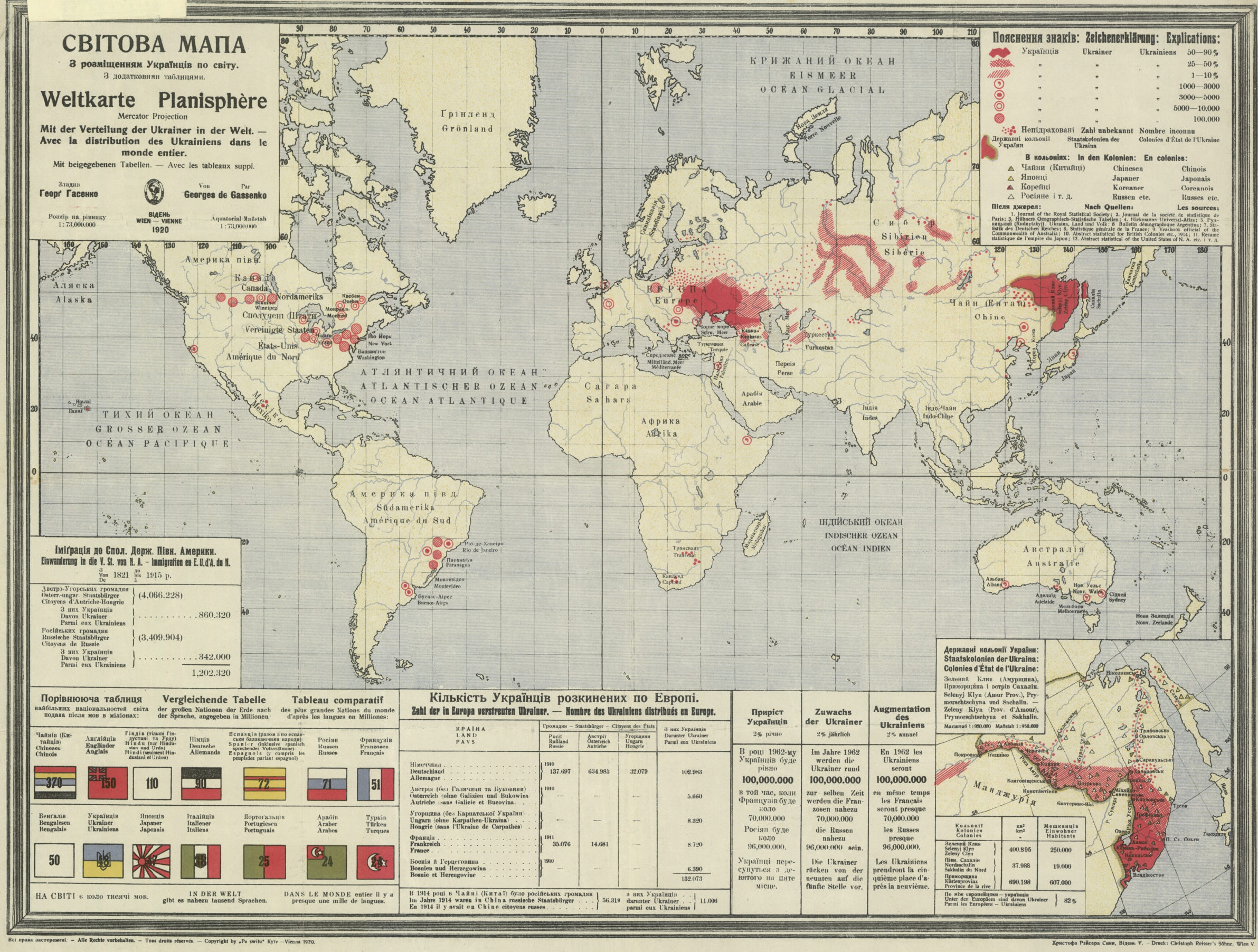
Settlement of Ukrainians around the world in 1920, by Ukrainian politician Yuri Hasenko

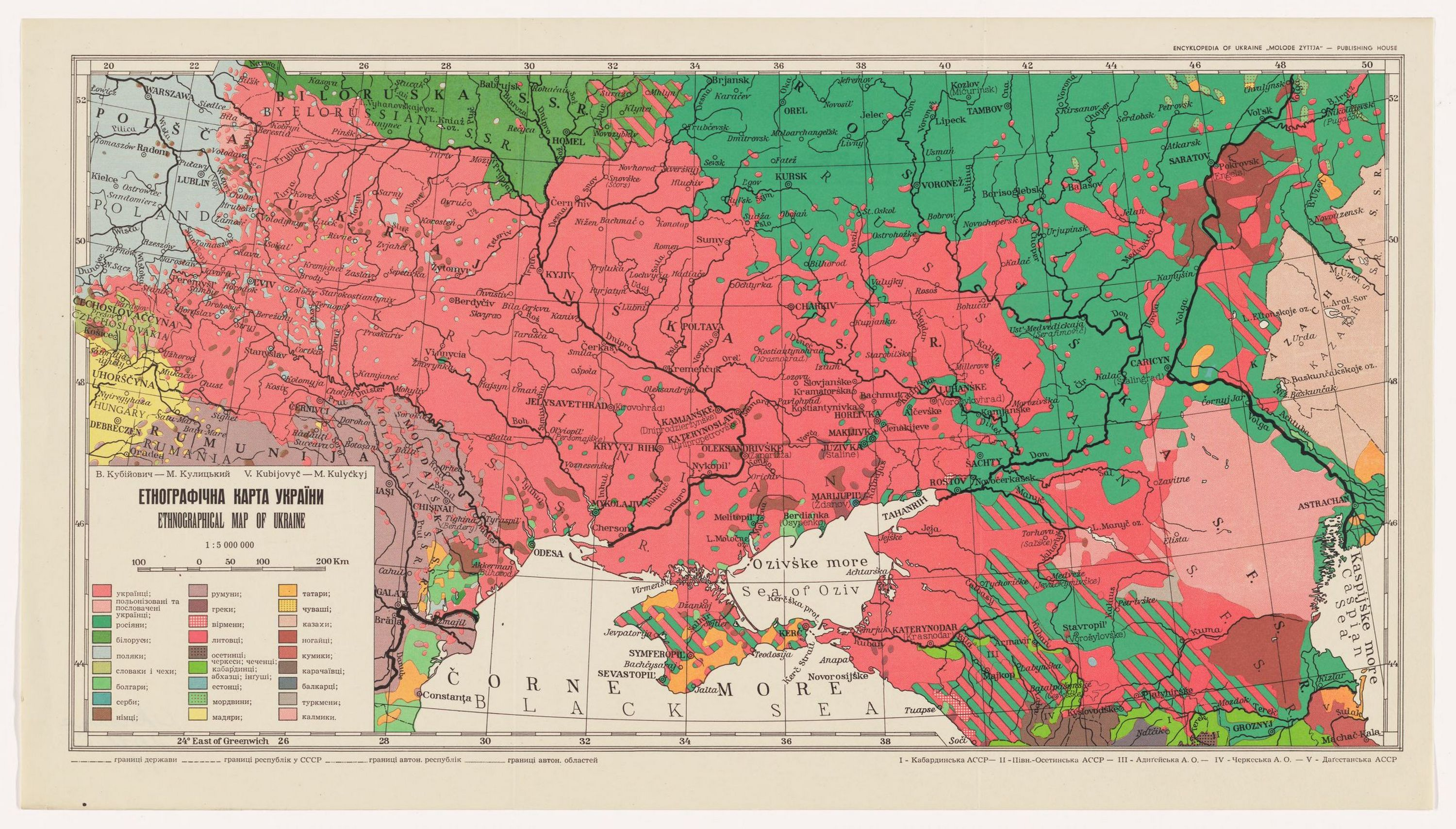
"Ethnographical Map of Ukraine" printed just after World War II—land inhabited by a plurality of ethnic Ukrainians is coloured rose (not to be confused with the colour given to Kalmyks, also rose)

Population of ethnic Ukrainians in Ukraine by oblast (2001)

Most ethnic Ukrainians live in Ukraine, where they make up over three-quarters of the population. The largest population of Ukrainians outside of Ukraine lives in Russia where about 1.9 million Russian citizens identify as Ukrainian, while millions of others (primarily in southern Russia and Siberia) have some Ukrainian ancestry. The inhabitants of the Kuban, for example, have vacillated among three identities: Ukrainian, Russian (an identity supported by the Soviet regime) and "Cossack". Approximately 800,000 people of Ukrainian ancestry live in the Russian Far East in an area known historically as "Green Ukraine".

In a 2011 national poll of Ukraine, 49% of Ukrainians said they had relatives living in Russia.

According to some previous assumptions, an estimated number of almost 2.4 million people of Ukrainian origin live in North America (1,359,655 in Canada and 1,028,492 in the United States). Large numbers of Ukrainians also live in Brazil (600,000); (Note: See also Prudentópolis, Brazil.) Kazakhstan (338,022); Moldova (325,235); Argentina (305,000); (Germany) (272,000); Italy (234,354); Belarus (225,734); Uzbekistan (124,602); the Czech Republic (110,245); Spain (90,530–100,000) and Romania (51,703–200,000). There are also large Ukrainian communities in such countries as Latvia, Portugal, France, Australia, Paraguay, the UK, Israel, Slovakia, Kyrgyzstan, Austria, Uruguay and the former Yugoslavia. Generally, the Ukrainian diaspora is present in more than 120 countries of the world.

The number of Ukrainians in Poland amounted to some 51,000 people in 2011 (according to the Polish census). Since 2014, the country has experienced a large increase in immigration from Ukraine. More recent data put the number of Ukrainian migrant workers at 1.2–1.3 million in 2016. (Note: Ukrainian citizens may take up employment in Poland without obtaining a work permit for a maximum period of 6 months within a year on the basis of a declaration of intention to entrust a job to a foreigner. In 2016, over 1.262 million such declarations were issued for Ukrainian nationals. Archived 5 November 2021 at the Wayback Machine Archived 10 April 2022 at the Wayback Machine)

In the last decades of the 19th century, many Ukrainians were forced by the Tsarist autocracy to move to the Asian regions of Russia, while many of their counterpart Slavs under Austro-Hungarian rule emigrated to the New World in search of work and better economic opportunities. According to some sources in the first decade of the 2000s, around 20 million people outside Ukraine identify as having Ukrainian ethnicity; however, the official data of the respective countries calculated together does not show more than 10 million. In any event, Ukrainians have one of the largest diasporas in the world.

== Origin ==
The East Slavs emerged from the undifferentiated early Slavs in the Slavic migrations of the 6th and 7th centuries CE. The state of Kievan Rus united the East Slavs during the 9th to 13th centuries. East Slavic tribes cited as "proto-Ukrainian" include the Volhynians, Derevlianians, Polianians, and Siverianians and the less significant Ulychians, Tivertsians, and White Croats. The Gothic historian Jordanes and 6th-century Byzantine authors named two groups that lived in the south-east of Europe: Sclavins (western Slavs) and Antes. Polianians are identified as the founders of the city of Kiev and as playing the key role in the formation of the Kievan Rus' state.

At the beginning of the 9th century, Varangians used the waterways of Eastern Europe for military raids and trade, particularly the trade route from the Varangians to the Greeks. Until the 11th century these Varangians also served as key mercenary troops for a number of princes in medieval Kiev, as well as for some of the Byzantine emperors, while others occupied key administrative positions in Kievan Rus' society, and eventually became slavicized. Besides other cultural traces, several Ukrainian names show traces of Norse origins as a result of influences from that period.

Differentiation between separate East Slavic groups began to emerge in the later medieval period; and an East Slavic dialect continuum developed within the Polish–Lithuanian Commonwealth, with the Ruthenian language emerging as a written standard. The active development of a concept of a Ukrainian nation and the Ukrainian language began with the Ukrainian National Revival in the early 19th century in times when Ruthenians (Русини) changed their name because of the regional name. In the Soviet era (1917–1991), official historiography emphasised "the cultural unity of 'proto-Ukrainians' and 'proto-Russians' in the fifth and sixth centuries".

A poll conducted in April 2022 by the polling organisation Rating found that the vast majority (91%) of Ukrainians (excluding the Russian-occupied territories of Ukraine) do not support the thesis that "Russians and Ukrainians are one people".

=== Genetics and genomics ===
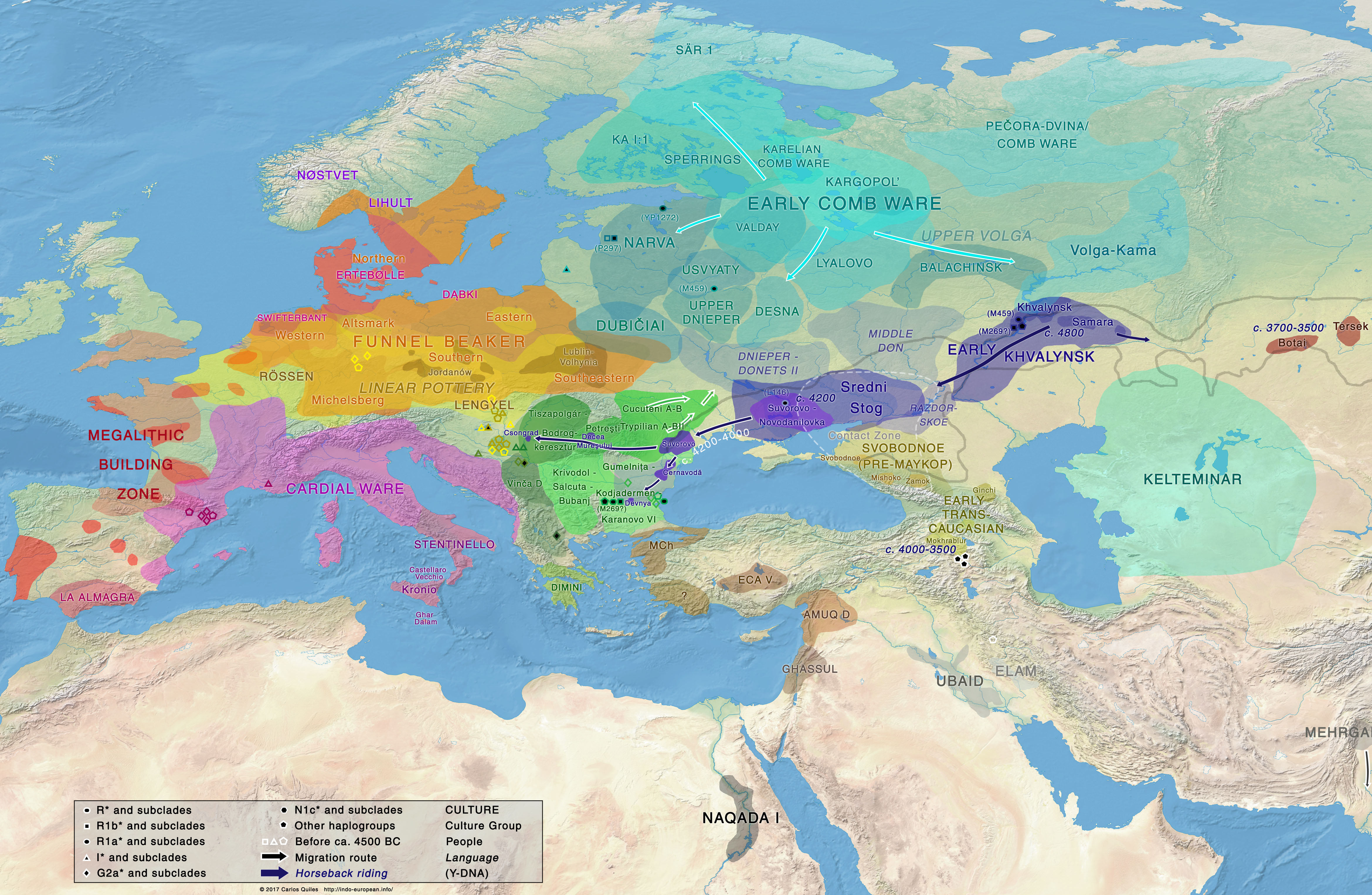
Neolithic migrations c. 5000–4000 BC. The people of the Proto-Indo-European Sredny Stog culture were the result of a genetic admixture between the Eastern European hunter-gatherers and Caucasus hunter-gatherers.

Ukrainians, like most Europeans, largely descend from three distinct lineages: Mesolithic hunter-gatherers, descended from populations associated with the Paleolithic Epigravettian culture; Neolithic Early European Farmers, who migrated from Anatolia during the Neolithic Revolution 9,000 years ago; and Yamnaya Steppe pastoralists, who expanded into Europe from the Pontic–Caspian steppe of Ukraine and southern Russia in the context of Indo-European migrations 5,000 years ago.

In a survey of 97 genomes for diversity in full genome sequences among self-identified Ukrainians from Ukraine, a study identified more than 13 million genetic variants, representing about a quarter of the total genetic diversity discovered in Europe. Among these, nearly 500,000 were previously undocumented and likely to be unique for this population, medically relevant mutations whose prevalence in the Ukrainian genomes differed significantly compared to other European genome sequences, particularly from Western Europe and Russia. Ukrainian genomes form a single cluster positioned between the Northern European populations on one side, and Western European populations on the other.

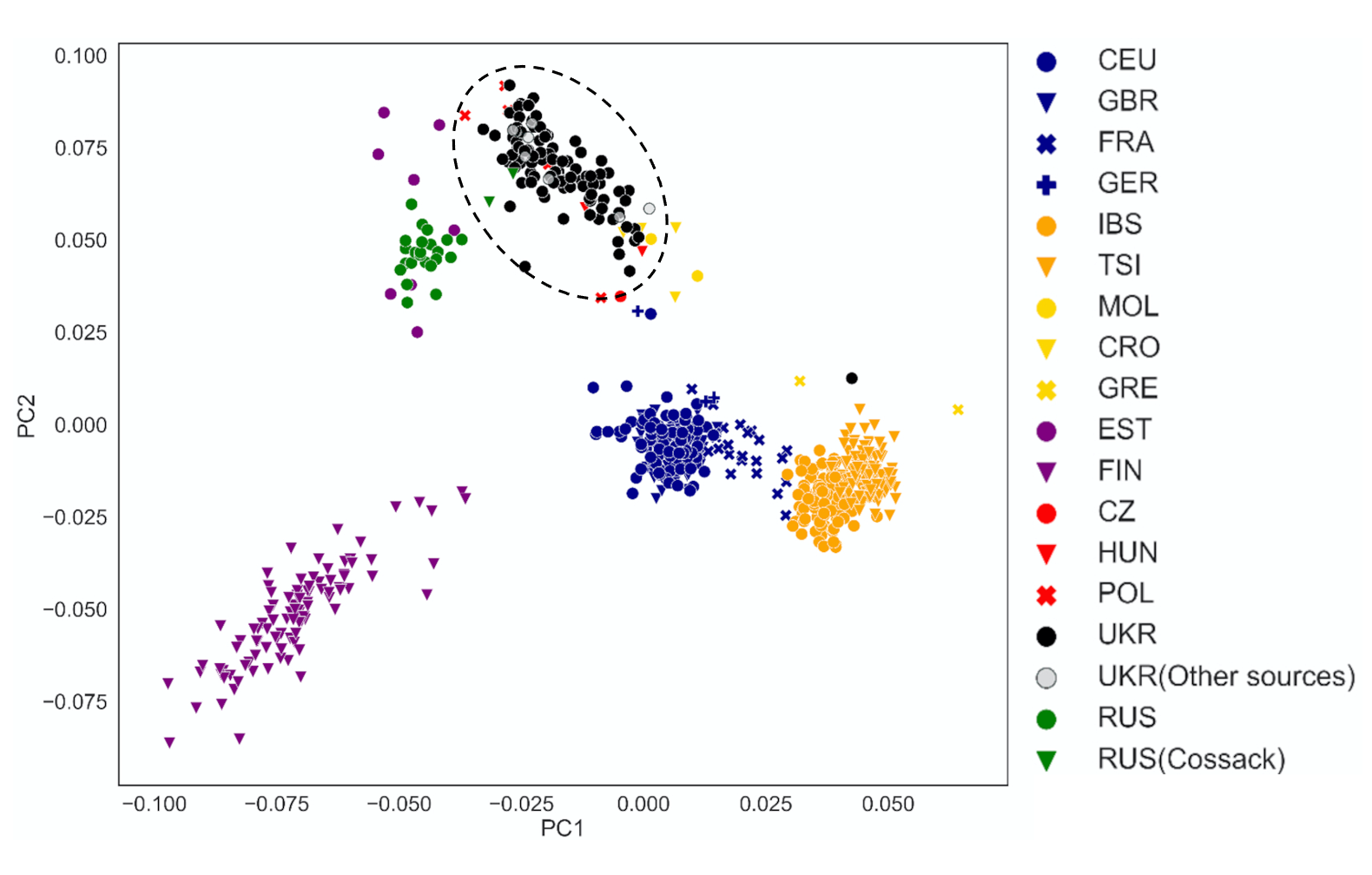
Principal Component Analysis of European populations from the Genome Ukraine Project

There was a significant overlap with Central European populations as well as with people from the Balkans.

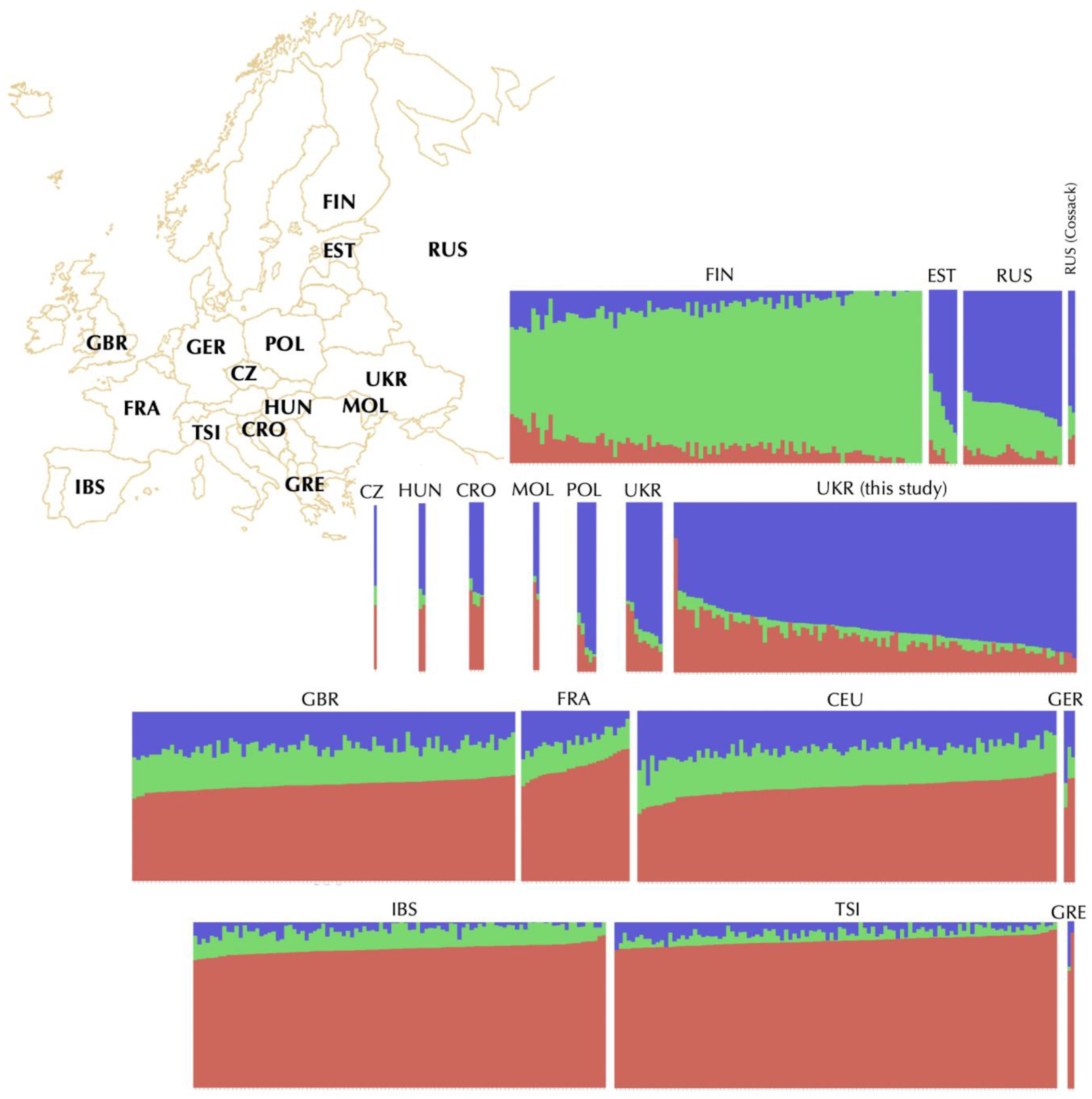
Structure plot of European populations from the Genome Ukraine Project

In addition to the close geographic distance between these populations, this may also reflect the insufficient representation of samples from the surrounding populations.

The Ukrainian gene-pool includes the following Y-haplogroups, in order from the most prevalent:

- R1a (43%)
- I2a (23%)
- R1b (8%)
- E1b1b (7%)
- I1 (5%)
- N1 (5%)
- J2 (4%)
- G (3%)
- T (1%)

Roughly all R1a Ukrainians carry R1a-Z282; it has been found significantly only in Eastern Europe. Chernivtsi Oblast is the only region in Ukraine where Haplogroup I2a occurs more frequently than R1a, much less frequent even in Ivano-Frankivsk Oblast. In comparison to their northern and eastern neighbours, Ukrainians have a similar percentage of Haplogroup R1a-Z280 (43%) in their population—compare Belarusians, Russians and Lithuanians (55%, 46%, and 42% respectively). Populations in Eastern Europe that have never been Slavic do as well. Ukrainians in Chernivtsi Oblast (near the Romanian border) have a higher percentage of I2a as opposed to R1a, which is typical of the Balkan region, but a smaller percentage than Russians of the N1c1 lineage found among Finno-Ugric, Baltic and Siberian populations, and also less R1b than West Slavs. In terms of haplogroup distribution, the genetic pattern of Ukrainians most closely resembles that of Belarusians.

The presence of the N1c lineage is explained by a contribution of the assimilated Finno-Ugric tribes.

== Related ethnic groups ==
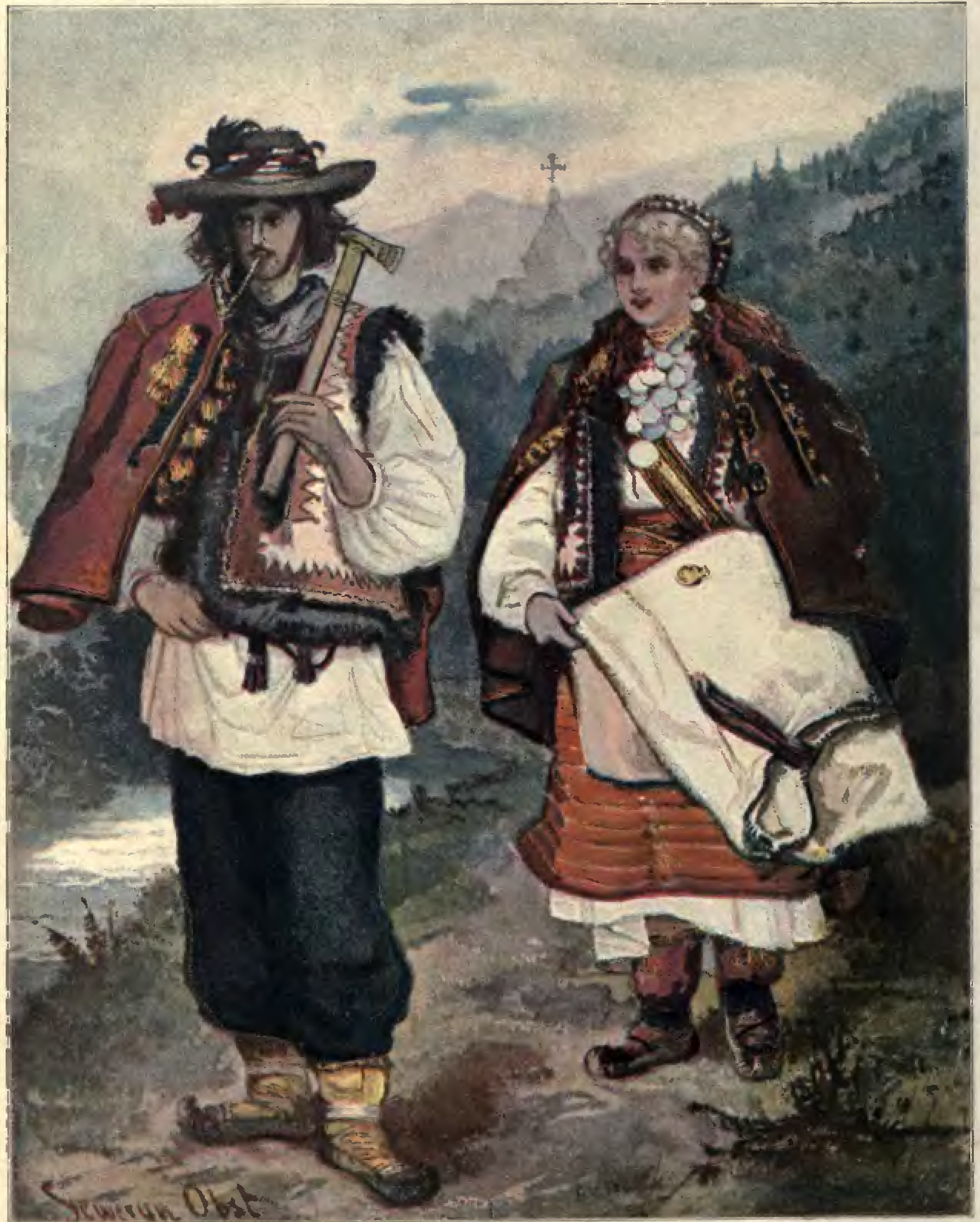
Portrait of Hutsuls, living in the Carpathian Mountains, 1902

Within Ukraine and adjacent areas, there are several other distinct ethnic sub-groups, especially in western Ukraine: places like Zakarpattia and Halychyna. Among them the best known are Hutsuls, Volhynians, Boykos, and Lemkos (otherwise known as Carpatho-Rusyns—a derivative of Carpathian Ruthenians)— each with particular areas of settlement, dialect, dress and folk traditions.

== History ==
Ukraine has had a very turbulent history, a fact explained by its geographical position.

=== Kievan Rus' ===
In the 9th century, the Varangians from Scandinavia conquered the proto-Slavic tribes on the territory of today's Ukraine, Belarus, and western Russia and laid the groundwork for the Kievan Rus' state. The ancestors of the Ukrainian nation, such as Polianians, had an important role in the development and culturalisation of the Kievan Rus' state. The internecine wars between the princes of Rus', which began after the death of Yaroslav the Wise, led to the political fragmentation of the state into a number of principalities. Because the princes' quarrelling left Kievan Rus' vulnerable to foreign attacks, the invasions of the Mongols in 1236 and 1240 finally destroyed the state. Another important state in Ukrainians history is the Kingdom of Galicia–Volhynia (1199–1349).

=== Cossack Hetmanate ===
The third important state in Ukrainian history is the Cossack Hetmanate. Since the late 15th century, the Cossacks of Zaporizhzhia controlled the lower bends of the Dnieper River between Russia, Poland, and the Tatars of Crimea, with the fortified capital, Zaporozhian Sich. Hetman Bohdan Khmelnytsky is one of the most celebrated and at the same time most controversial political figures in Ukraine's early-modern history. A brilliant military leader, his greatest achievement in the process of national revolution was the formation of the Cossack Hetmanate state of the Zaporozhian Host (1648–1782).

The period of the Ruin in the late 17th century is characterised by the disintegration of Ukrainian statehood and general decline. During the Ruin, Ukraine became divided along the Dnieper River into Left-Bank Ukraine and Right-Bank Ukraine, and the two halves became hostile to each other. The Ukrainian leaders during this period are considered largely opportunists and men of little vision who could not muster broad popular support for their policies. At the end of the century, there were roughly 4 million Ukrainians.

=== Short-lived independence ===
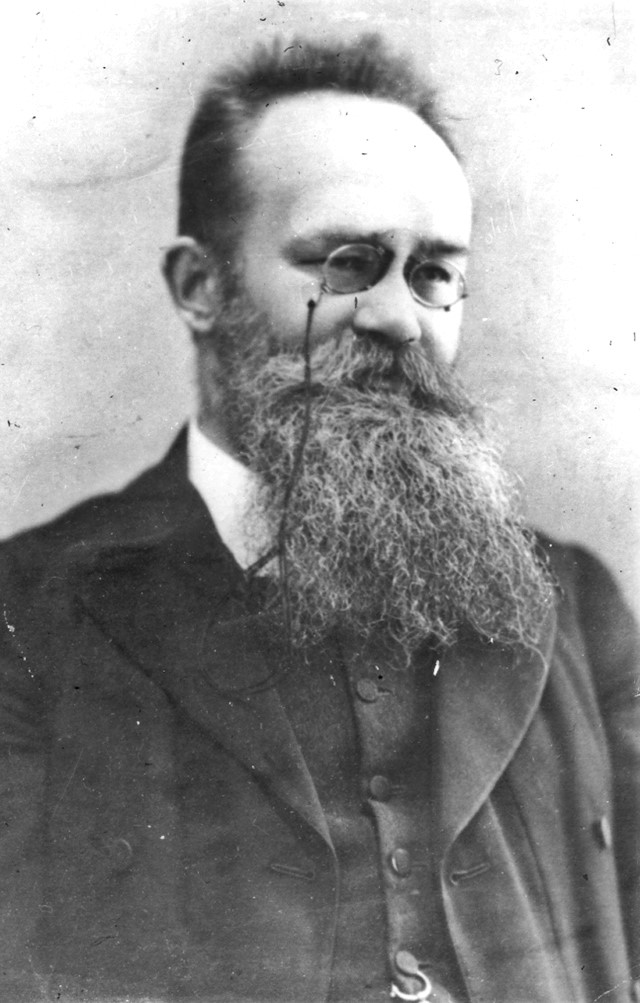
Mykhailo Hrushevsky

In the final stages of the First World War, a powerful struggle for an independent Ukrainian state developed in the central Ukrainian territories, which, until 1917, were part of the Russian Empire. The newly established Ukrainian government, the Central Rada, headed by Mykhailo Hrushevsky, issued four universals, the Fourth of which, dated 22 January 1918, declared the independence and sovereignty of the Ukrainian National Republic (UNR) on 25 January 1918. The session of the Central Rada on 29 April 1918 ratified the Constitution of the UNR and elected Hrushevsky president.

=== Soviet period ===
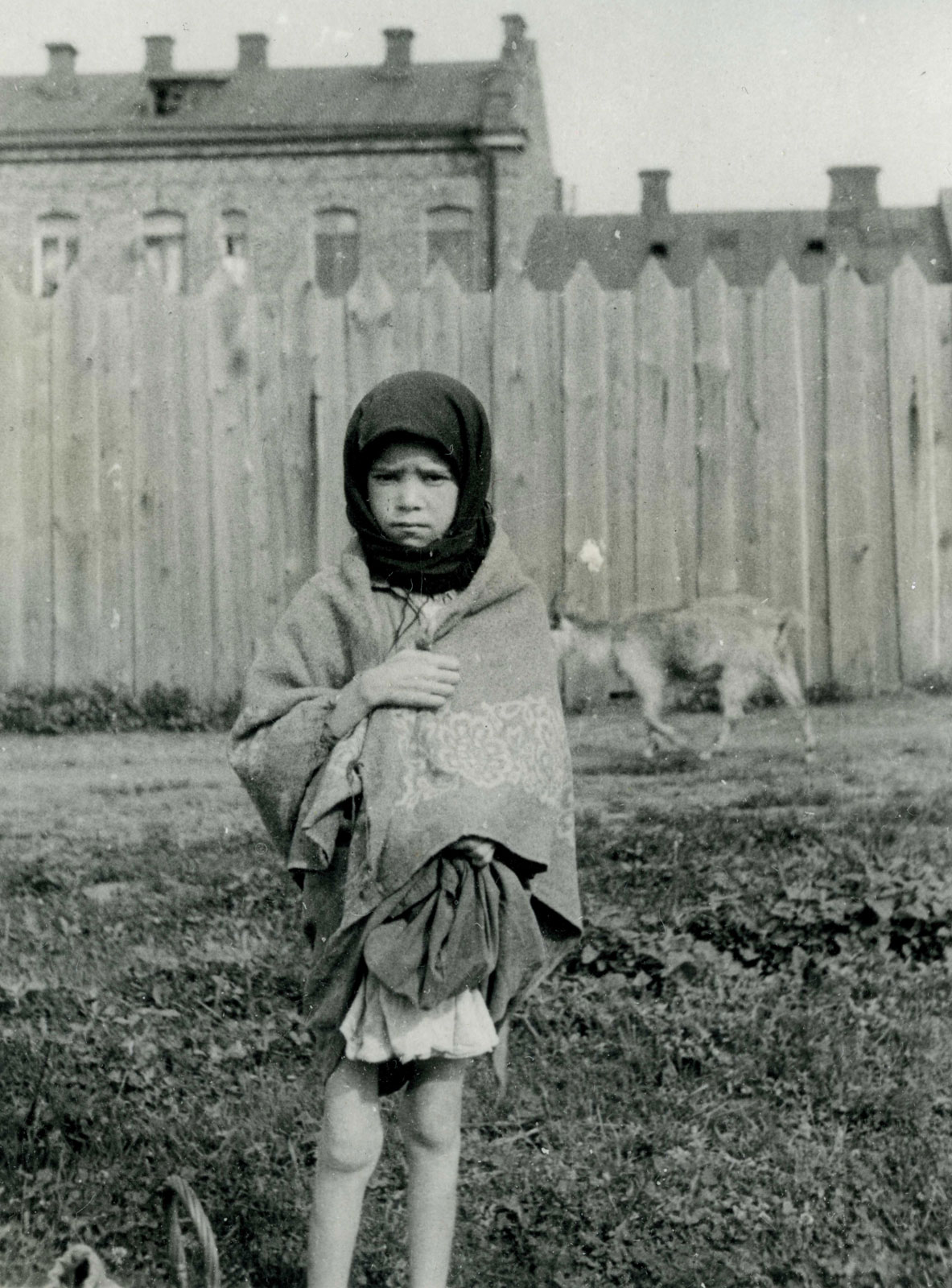
A girl in Kharkiv during the Holodomor

During the 1920s, under the Ukrainisation policy pursued by the national Communist leadership of Mykola Skrypnyk, Soviet leadership encouraged a national renaissance in the Ukrainian culture and language. Ukrainisation was part of the Soviet-wide policy of Korenisation (literally "indigenisation").

In 1932–1933, millions of Ukrainians were starved to death by the Soviet regime, which led to a famine known as the Holodomor. The Soviet regime remained silent about the Holodomor and provided no aid to the victims or the survivors. But news and information about what was going on reached the West and evoked public responses in Polish-ruled Western Ukraine and in the Ukrainian diaspora. Since the 1990s, the independent Ukrainian state, particularly under President Viktor Yushchenko, the Ukrainian mass media and academic institutions, many foreign governments, most Ukrainian scholars, and many foreign scholars have viewed and written about the Holodomor as genocide and issued official declarations and publications to that effect. Modern scholarly estimates of the direct loss of human life due to the famine range between 2.6 million, (3–3.5 million), and 12 million, although much higher numbers are usually published in the media and cited in political debates. As of March 2008, the parliament of Ukraine and the governments of several countries, including the United States, have recognised the Holodomor as an act of genocide. (Note: Sources differ on interpreting various statements from different branches of different governments as to whether they amount to the official recognition of the Famine as Genocide by the country. For example, after the statement issued by the Latvian Sejm on 13 March 2008, the total number of countries is given as 19 (according to Ukrainian BBC: "Латвія визнала Голодомор ґеноцидом" Archived 19 August 2015 at the Wayback Machine), 16 (according to Korrespondent, Russian edition: "После продолжительных дебатов Сейм Латвии признал Голодомор геноцидом украинцев" Archived 6 August 2012 at the Wayback Machine), "more than 10" (according to Korrespondent, Ukrainian edition: "Латвія визнала Голодомор 1932–33 рр. геноцидом українців" ))

Following the Invasion of Poland in September 1939, German and Soviet troops divided the territory of Poland. Thus, Eastern Galicia and Volhynia with their Ukrainian population became part of Soviet Ukraine. When the German armies invaded the Soviet Union on 22 June 1941, those regions temporarily became part of the Nazi-controlled Reichskommissariat Ukraine (Ukrainian Realm Commissariat). In total, the number of ethnic Ukrainians who fought in the ranks of the Red Army is estimated from 4.5 million to 7 million. The pro-Soviet partisan guerrilla resistance in Ukraine is estimated to have numbered 47,800 from the start of occupation to 500,000 at its peak in 1944, with about 50% being ethnic Ukrainian. Of the estimated 8.6 million Soviet troop losses, 1.4 million were ethnic Ukrainians.

In 1943, under the command of Roman Shukhevych, the Ukrainian Insurgent Army (Ukrayins'ka Povstans'ka Armiia, or UPA) began ethnic cleansing. Shukhevych was one of the perpetrators of the Galicia-Volhynia massacres of tens of thousands of Polish civilians. It is unclear to what extent Shuchevych was responsible for the massacres of Poles in Volhynia, but he certainly condoned them after some time and also directed the massacres of Poles in Eastern Galicia. Historian Per Anders Rudling has accused the Ukrainian diaspora and Ukrainian academics of "ignoring, glossing over, or outright denying" Shuchevych's role in this and other war crimes.

=== Historical maps of Ukraine ===
The Ukrainian state has occupied a number of territories since its initial foundation. Although most of these territories have been located within Eastern Europe, it has also at times extended well into Eurasia and South-Eastern Europe, as depicted in the maps in the gallery below. At times there has also been a distinct lack of a Ukrainian state because its territories were, on a number of occasions, annexed by its more powerful neighbours.

Historical maps of Ukraine and its predecessors
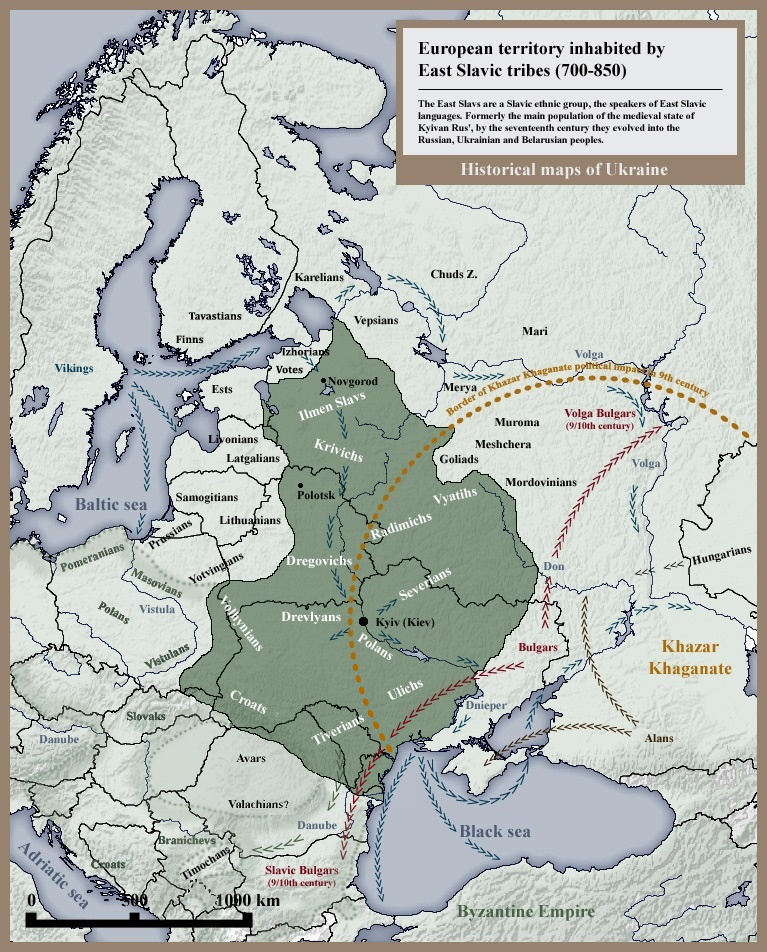
European territory inhabited by East Slavic tribes in 8th and 9th century.

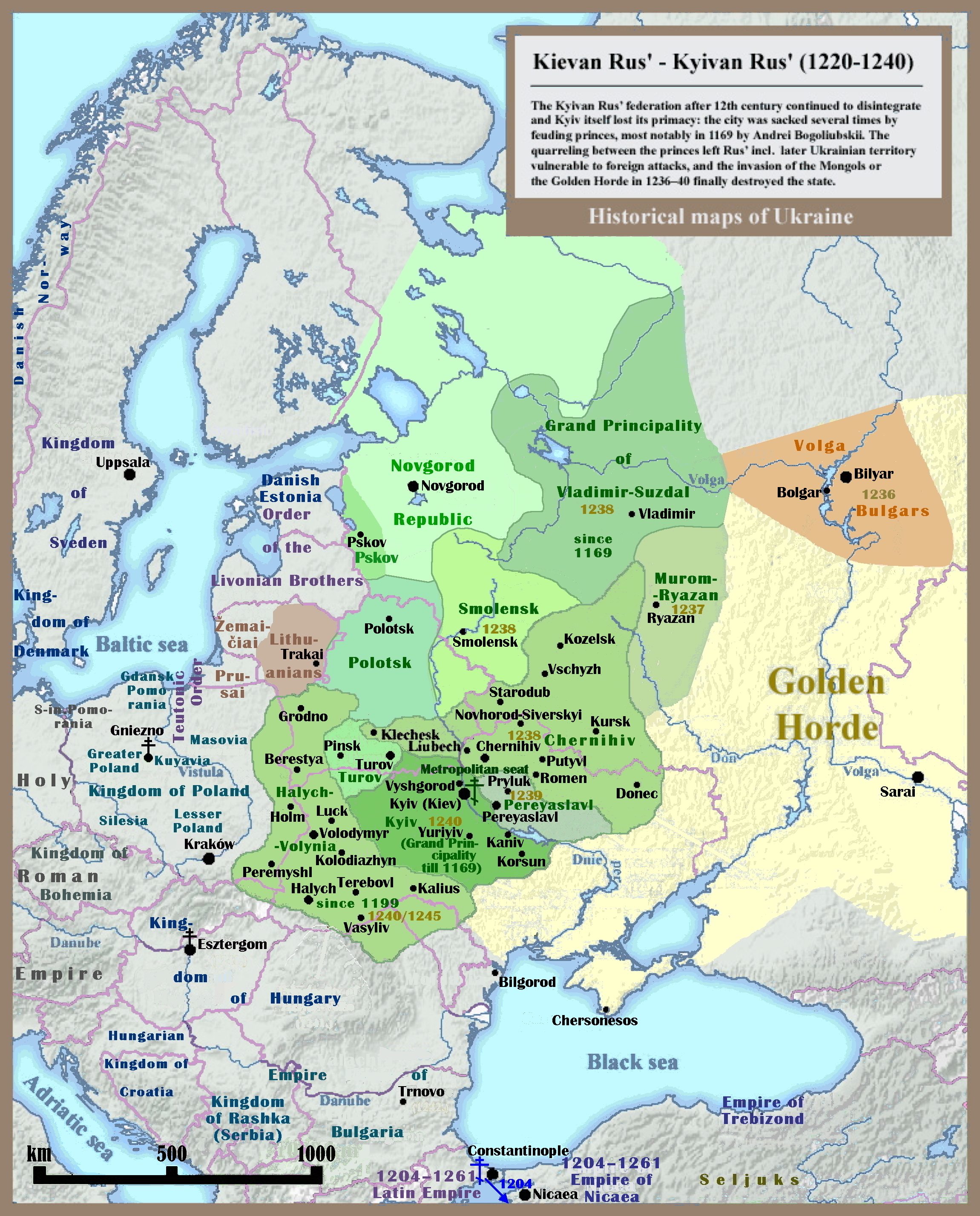
Historical map of Kievan Rus' and territory of Ukraine: last 20 years of the state (1220–1240).

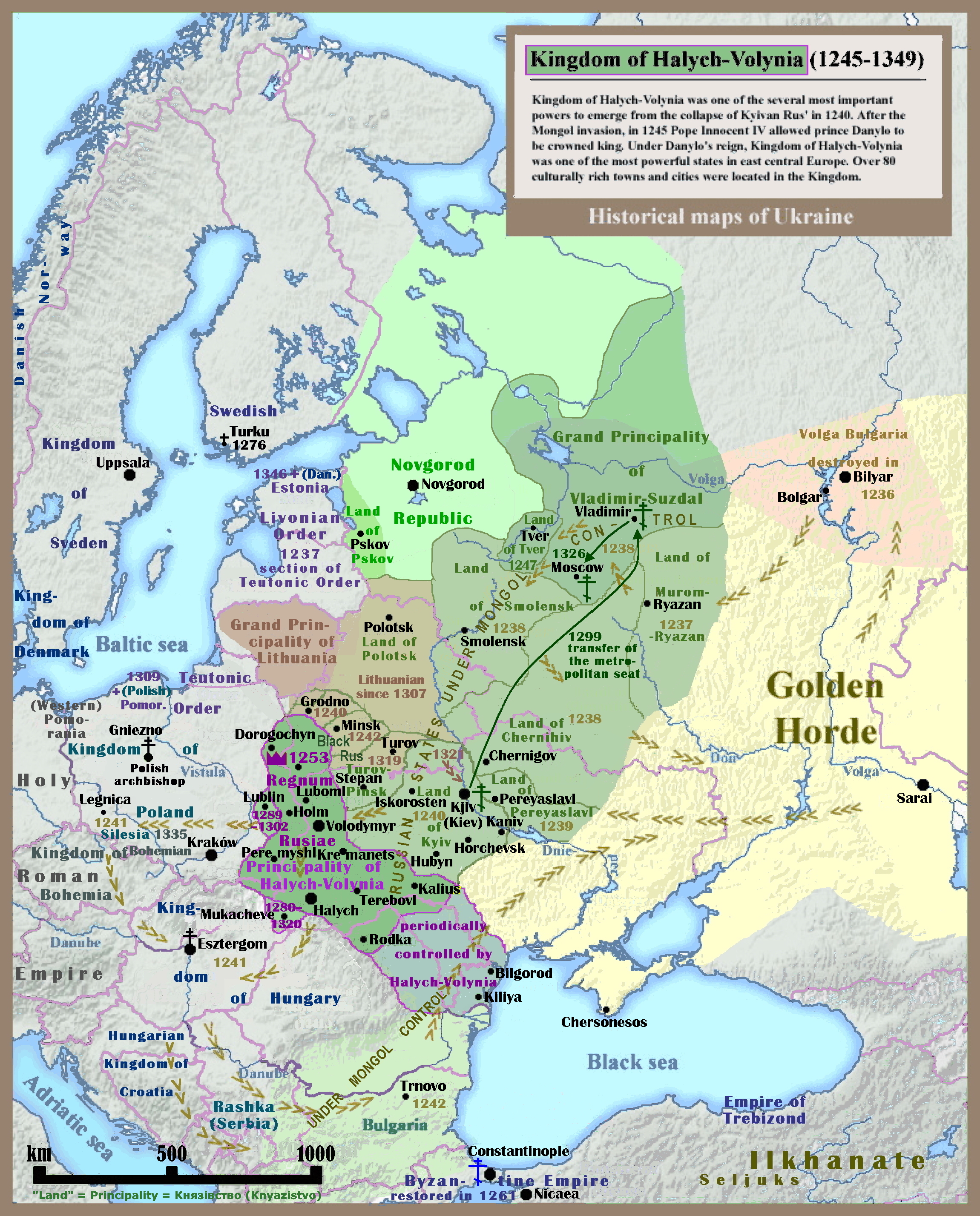
The Kingdom of Galicia–Volhynia or Kingdom of Halych-Volynia (1245–1349).

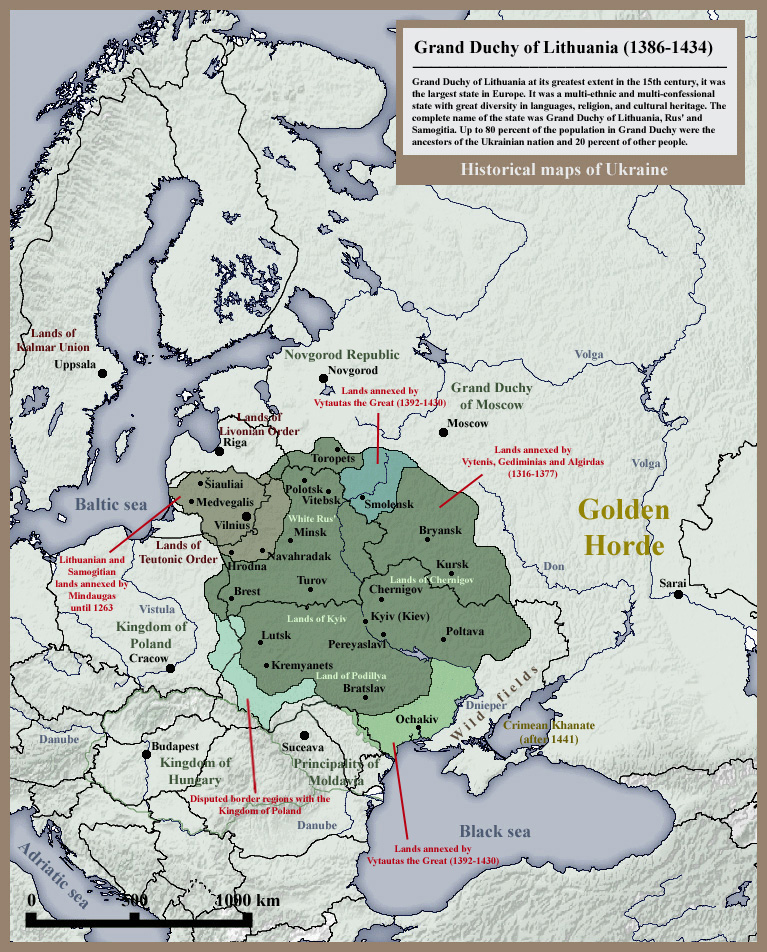
Historical map of Grand Duchy of Lithuania, Rus' (Ukraine) and Samogitia until 1434.

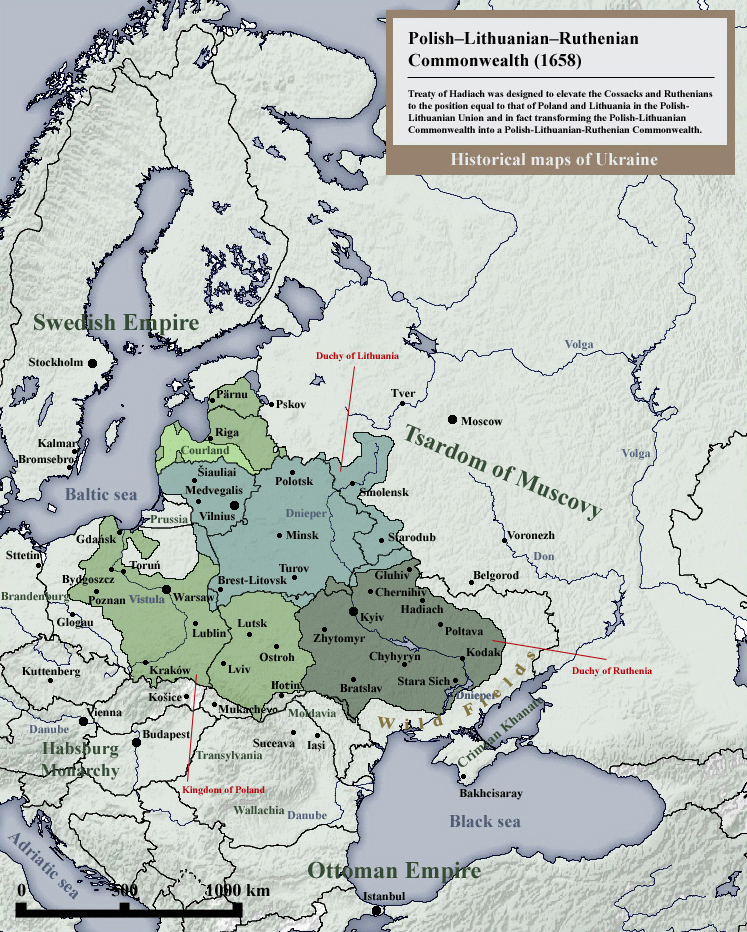
Polish–Lithuanian–Ruthenian Commonwealth or Commonwealth of Three Nations (1658).

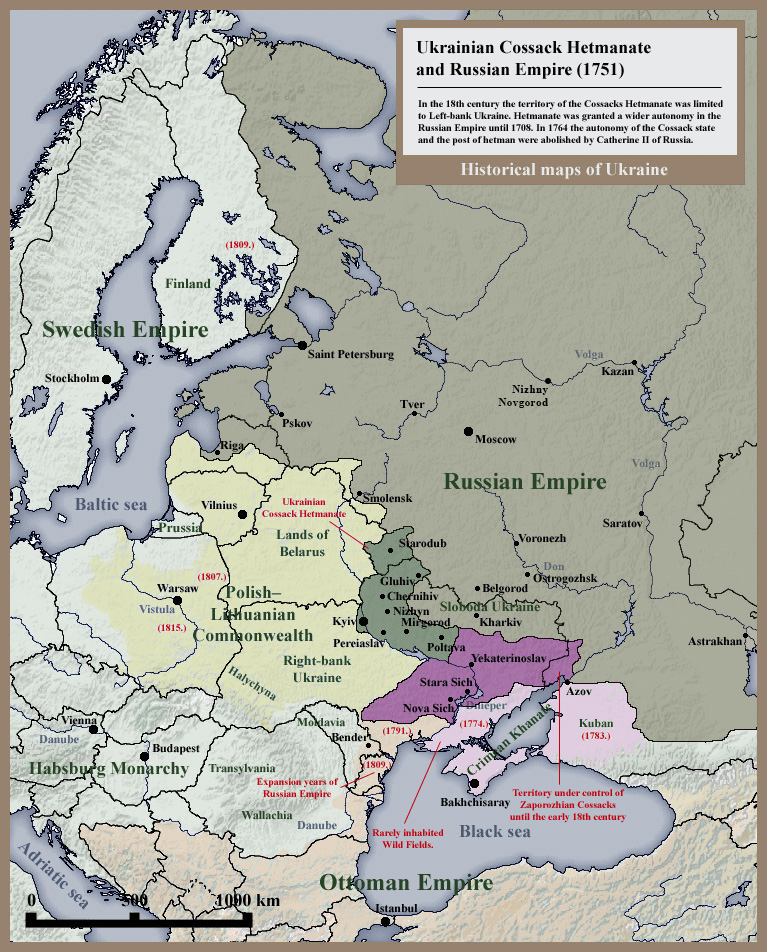
Historical map of Ukrainian Cossack Hetmanate and territory of Zaporozhian Cossacks under rule of Russian Empire (1751).

== Ethnic/national identity ==
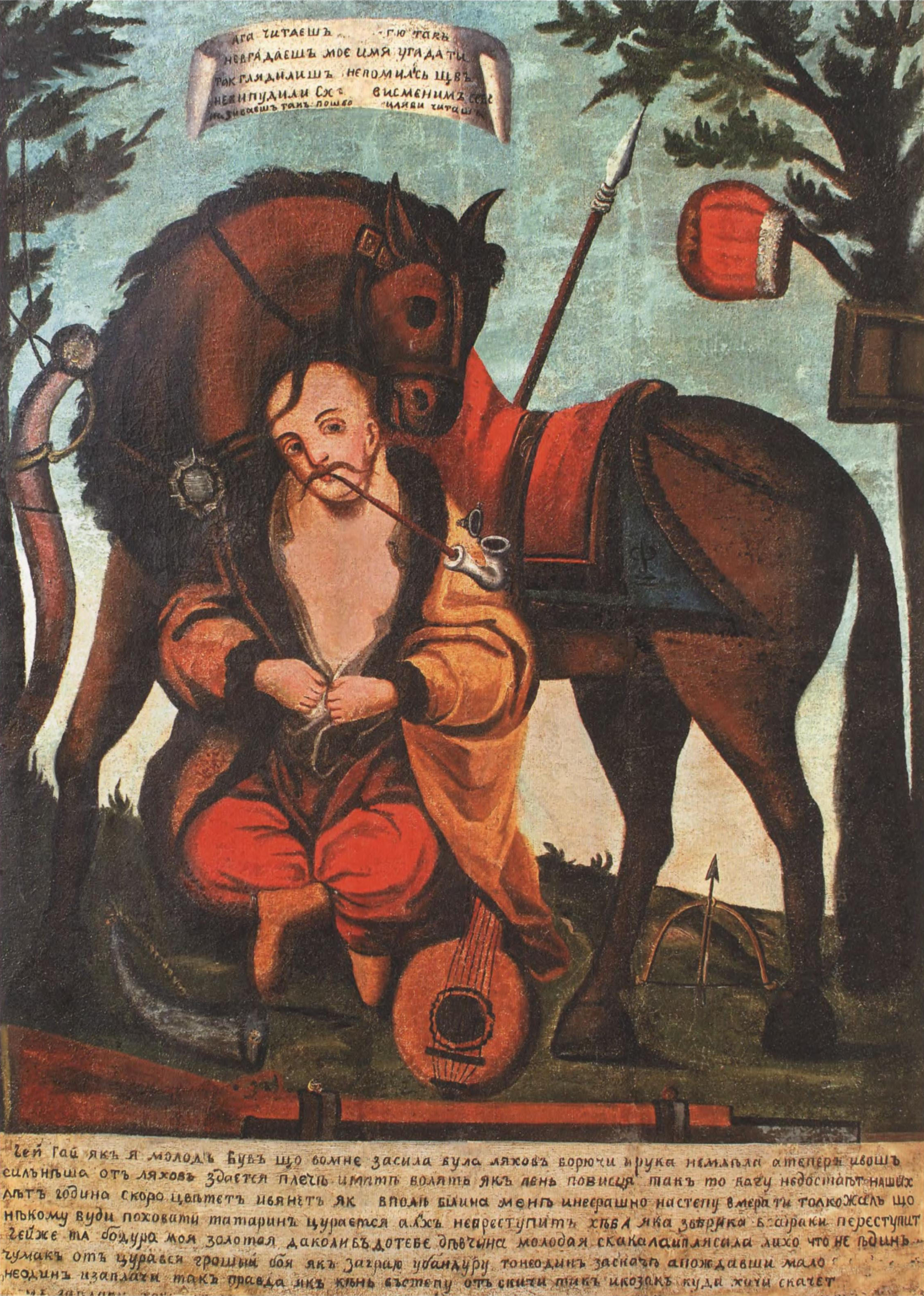
Cossack Mamay, one of several national personifications of Ukrainians

The watershed period in the development of modern Ukrainian national consciousness was the struggle for independence during the creation of the Ukrainian People's Republic from 1917 to 1921. A concerted effort to reverse the growth of Ukrainian national consciousness was begun by the regime of Joseph Stalin in the late 1920s, continuing with minor interruptions until the most recent times. The man-made famine of 1932–1933, the deportations of the so-called kulaks, the physical annihilation of the nationally conscious intelligentsia, and terror in general were used to destroy and subdue the Ukrainian nation. Even after Joseph Stalin's death, the concept of a Russified though multiethnic Soviet people was officially promoted, according to which non-Russian nationals were relegated to second-class status. Despite this, many Ukrainians played prominent roles in the Soviet Union, including such public figures as Semen Tymoshenko.

The creation of a sovereign and independent Ukraine in 1991, however, pointed to the failure of the policy of the "merging of nations" and to the enduring strength of the Ukrainian national consciousness.

Biculturalism is especially present in southeastern Ukraine, where there is a significant Russian minority. Historical colonisation of Ukraine is one reason that creates confusion about national identity to this day. Many citizens of Ukraine have adopted Ukrainian national identity in the past 20 years. According to the concept of nationality dominant in Eastern Europe, the Ukrainians are people whose native language is Ukrainian (an objective criterion) whether or not they are nationally conscious, and all those who identify themselves as Ukrainian (a subjective criterion) whether or not they speak Ukrainian.

Attempts to introduce a territorial-political concept of Ukrainian nationality on the Western European model (presented by political philosopher Vyacheslav Lypynsky) were unsuccessful until the 1990s. Territorial loyalty has also been manifested by the historical national minorities living in Ukraine. The official declaration of Ukrainian sovereignty of 16 July 1990 stated that "citizens of the Republic of all nationalities constitute the people of Ukraine."

== Culture ==
Due to Ukraine's geographical location, its culture primarily exhibits Eastern European influence, as well as Central European to an extent (primarily in the western region). Over the years, it has been influenced by movements such as those brought about during the Byzantine Empire and the Renaissance. Today, the country is somewhat culturally divided with the western regions bearing a stronger Central European influence and the eastern regions showing a significant Russian influence. A strong Christian culture was predominant for many centuries, although Ukraine was also the centre of conflict between the Catholic, Eastern Orthodox, and Islamic spheres of influence.

=== Language ===
Population of those whose mother tongue is Ukrainian in Ukraine (2001); the Russian linguistic influence in the south and east is noticeable

Ukrainian (украї́нська мо́ва, ukraі́nska móva) is the sole official language in Ukraine. It belongs to the East Slavic branch of the Slavic languages. Written Ukrainian uses the Ukrainian alphabet, one of many alphabets based on the Cyrillic. The language is a lineal descendant of the colloquial Old East Slavic language of the medieval state of Kievan Rus', which first split into Ruthenian and Russian. The Ruthenian languages then evolved into modern-day Ukrainian, Belarusian, and Rusyn. In modern-day Ukraine, most of its population are also fluent in Russian and many use it as their native tongue.

Comparisons are often made between Ukrainian and Russian, yet there is more mutual intelligibility with Belarusian and a very close lexical distance between the two. Historically, state-enforced Russification saw the Ukrainian language banned as a subject from schools and as a language of instruction in the Russian Empire. The linguistic oppression continued in various ways while Ukraine was a part of the Soviet Union; however, the language continued to be used throughout the country, especially in western Ukraine.

=== Religions ===
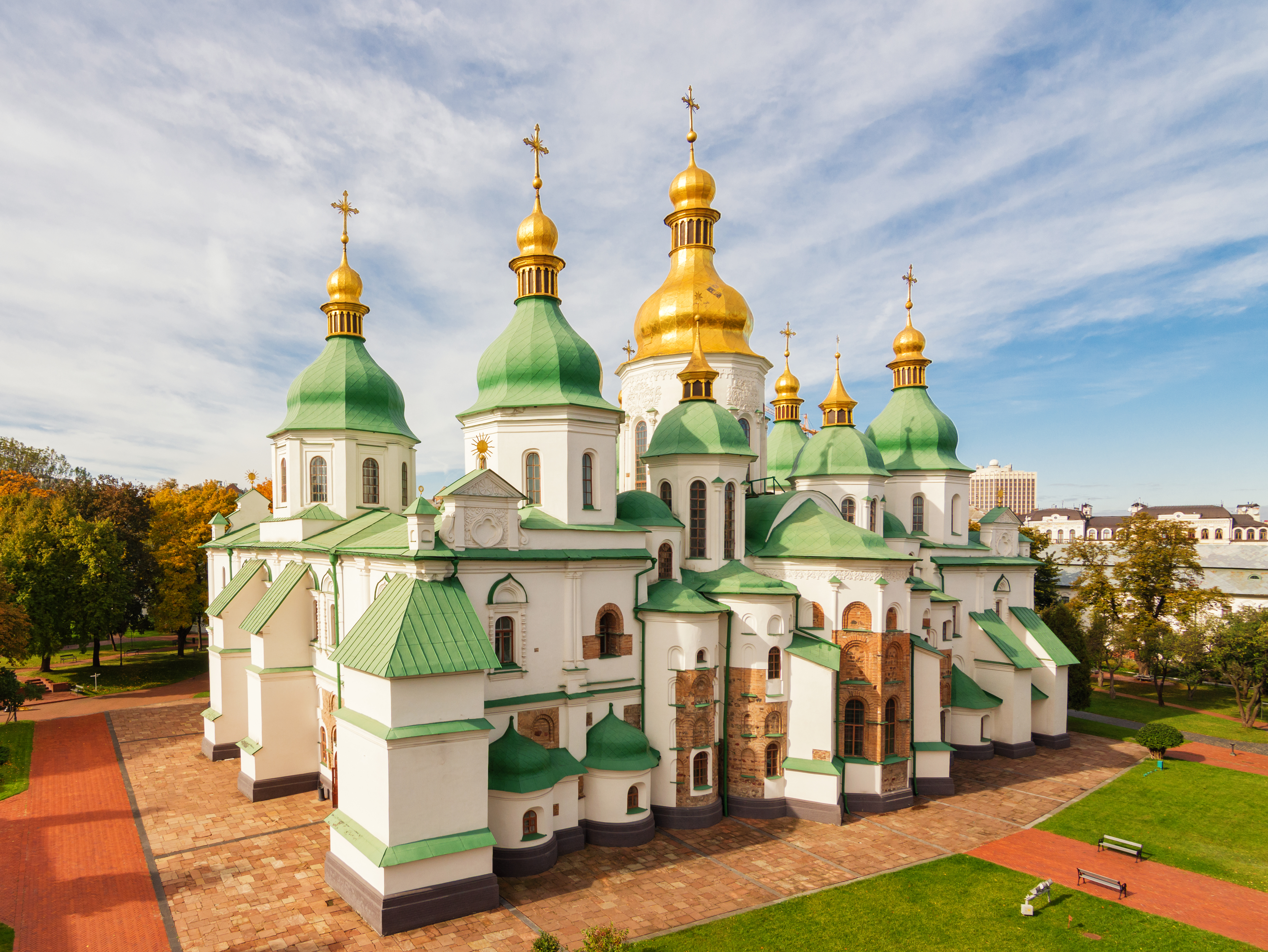
Historic Saint Sophia's Cathedral, Kyiv

Ukraine was inhabited by pagan tribes until Byzantine Rite Christianity was introduced by the turn of the first millennium. It was imagined by later writers who sought to put Kievan Rus' Christianity on the same level of primacy as Byzantine Christianity that Apostle Andrew himself visited the site where the city of Kiev would be later built.

However, it was only by the 10th century that the emerging state, the Kievan Rus', became influenced by the Byzantine Empire. The first known conversion was by the Princess Saint Olga, who came to Constantinople in 945 or 957. Several years later, her grandson, Prince Vladimir baptised his people in the Dnieper River. This began a long history of the dominance of the Eastern Orthodoxy in Ruthenia (Ukraine).

Ukrainians are majority Eastern Orthodox Christians, forming the second largest ethno-linguistic group among Eastern Orthodox in the world. The autocephalous Orthodox Church of Ukraine, headed by Metropolitan Epiphanius, is the most common church; whereas in the small areas of the country, the Ukrainian Orthodox Church, who were under the jurisdiction of the Moscow Patriarchate, is more common. The Russian invasion of Ukraine had an impact on the religious identity of some Ukrainians.

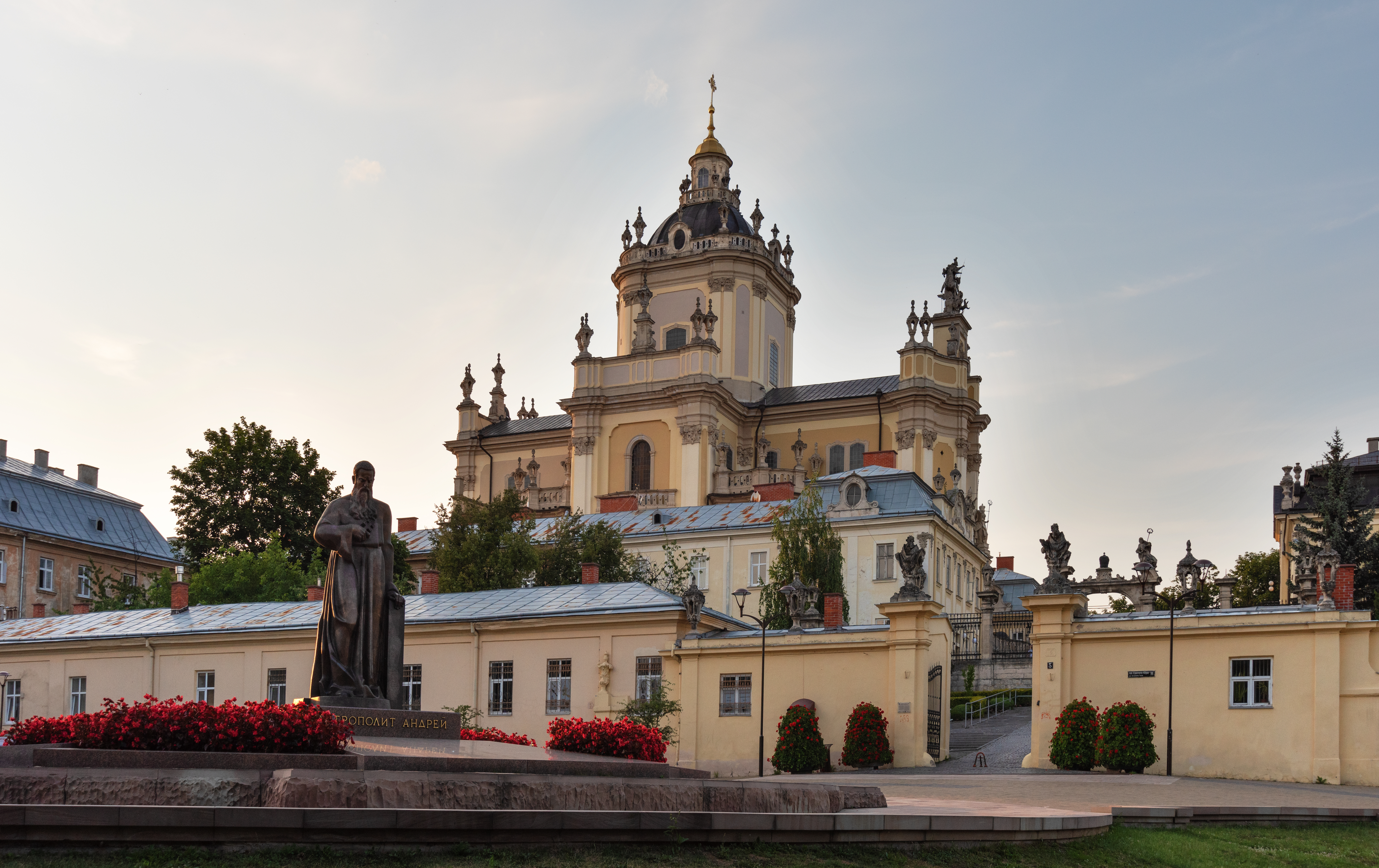
St. George's Cathedral, Lviv

In the Western region known as Halychyna, the Ukrainian Greek Catholic Church, one of the Eastern Rite Catholic Churches, has a strong membership. Since the fall of the Soviet Union, there has also been a growth of Protestant churches (Baptists, Evangelism, Pentecostalism). (Note: For more information, see History of Christianity in Ukraine and Religion in Ukraine.) Some Ukrainians are members of the Seventh-day Adventist Church and Jehovah's Witnesses. In addition, there are ethnic minorities practising other religions: Crimean Tatars (Islam), and Jews and Karaites (Judaism).

A 2020 survey conducted by the Razumkov Centre found that majority of Ukrainian populations was adhering to Christianity (81.9%). Of these Christians, 75.4% are Eastern Orthodox (34% of the Orthodox Church of Ukraine and 13.8% of the Moscow Patriarchate, and 27.6% are simply Orthodox); 8.2% are Greek Catholics; 7.1% are simply Christians; and a further 1.9% are Protestants and 0.4% are Latin Catholics. As of 2016, 16.3% of the population claims no religious affiliation, and 1.7% adheres to other religions. According to the same survey, 70% of the people of Ukraine declare themselves believers but do not belong to any church; 8.8% identifies with none of the denominations; and another 5.6% identify themselves as non-believers.

=== Cuisine ===
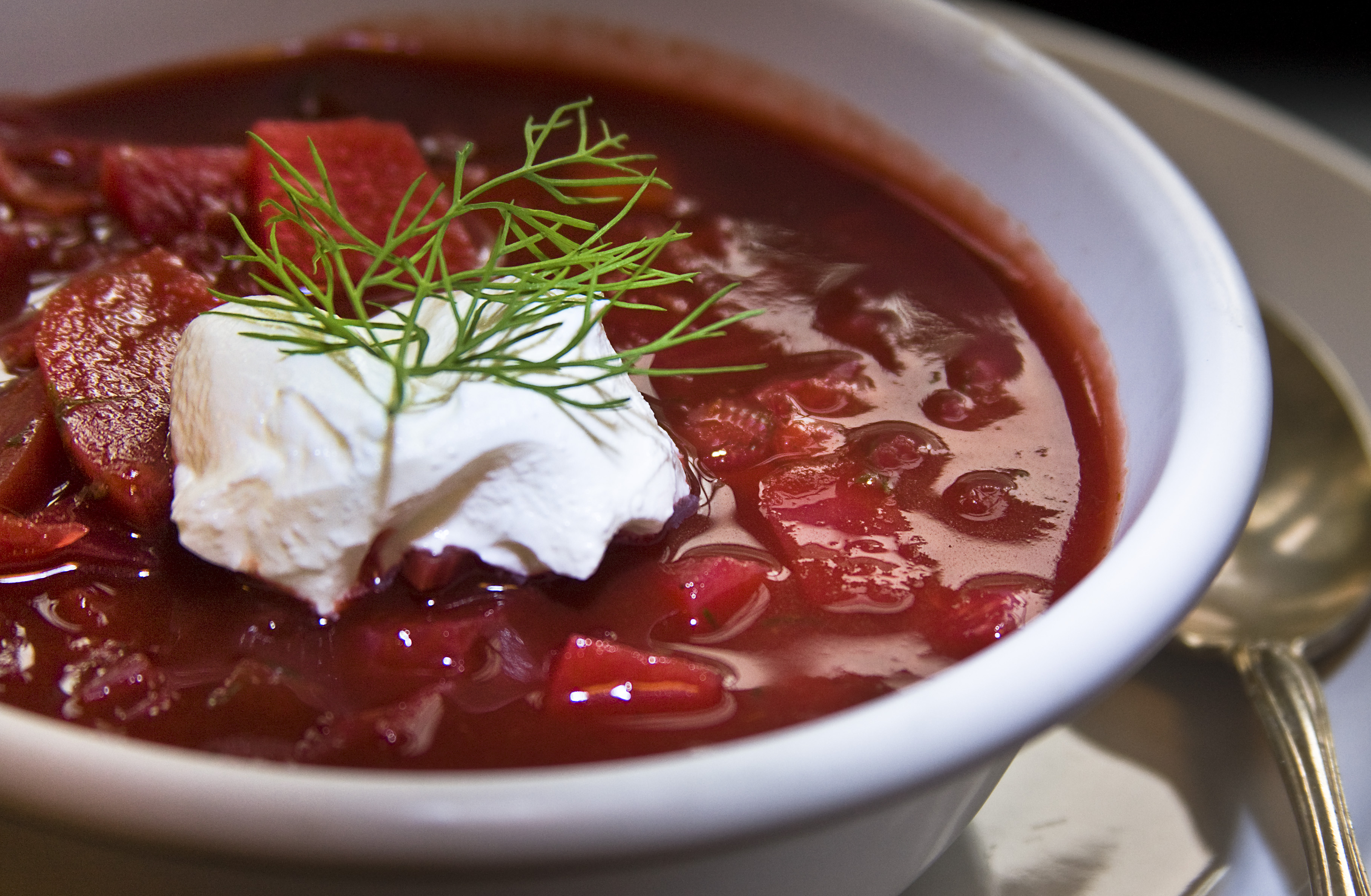
Borscht with smetana (sour cream)

Ukrainian cuisine has been formed by the nation's tumultuous history, geography, culture and social customs. Chicken is the most consumed type of protein, accounting for about half of the meat intake, followed by pork and beef. Vegetables such as potatoes, cabbages, mushrooms, and beetroots are widely consumed. Pickled vegetables are considered a delicacy. Salo, which is cured pork fat, is considered the national delicacy. Widely used herbs include dill, parsley, basil, coriander, and chives.

Ukraine is often called the "Breadbasket of Europe", and its plentiful grain and cereal resources such as rye and wheat play an important part in its cuisine; essential in making various kinds of bread. Chernozem, the country's black-coloured highly fertile soil, produces some of the world's most flavourful crops.

Popular traditional dishes varenyky (dumpling), nalysnyky (crêpe), kapusnyak (cabbage soup), nudli (dumpling stew), borscht (sour soup), and holubtsi (cabbage roll). Among traditional baked goods are decorated korovai and paska (Easter bread). Ukrainian specialties also include chicken Kiev and Kyiv cake. Popular drinks include uzvar (kompot), ryazhanka and horilka. Liquor (spirits) is the most consumed type of alcoholic beverage. Alcohol consumption has seen a stark decrease, although per capita it remains among the highest the world.

=== Music ===
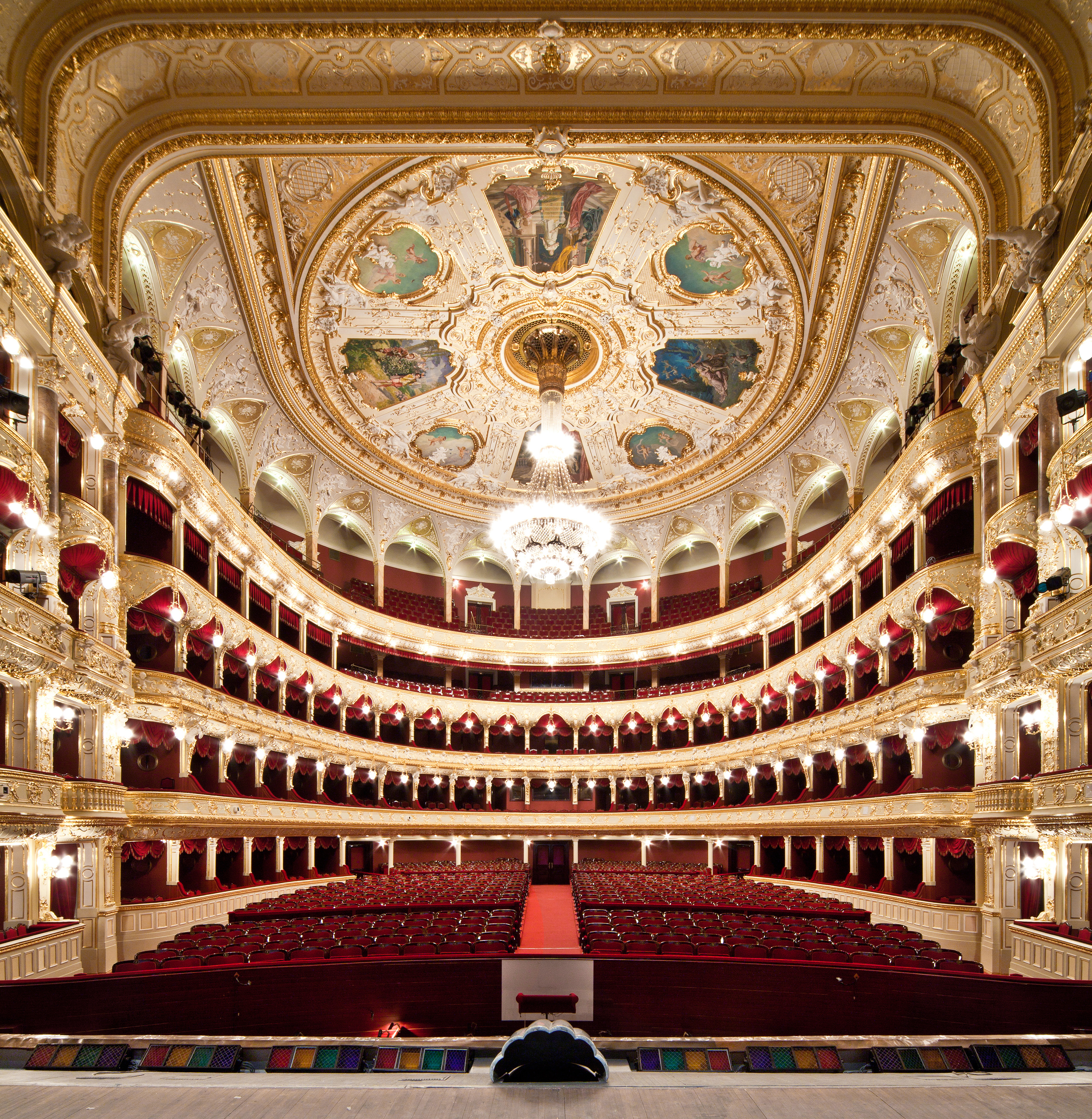
Odesa Opera House

Ukrainian music incorporates a diversity of external cultural influences. It also has a very strong indigenous Slavic and Christian uniqueness, the elements of which elements were used among many neighbouring nations.

Ukrainian folk oral literature, poetry and songs (such as the dumas) are among the most distinctive ethnocultural features of Ukrainians as a people. Religious music existed in Ukraine before the official adoption of Christianity, in the form of plainsong obychnyi spiv or musica practica. Traditional Ukrainian music is easily recognised by its somewhat melancholy tone. It first became known outside of Ukraine during the 15th century as musicians from Ukraine would perform before the royal courts in Poland (later in Russia).

A large number of famous musicians around the world was educated or born in Ukraine, among them famous names like Dmitry Bortniansky, Sergei Prokofiev, and Myroslav Skoryk. Ukraine is also the rarely acknowledged musical heartland of the former Russian Empire, home to its first professional music academy, which opened in the mid-18th century and produced numerous early musicians and composers.

=== Dance ===
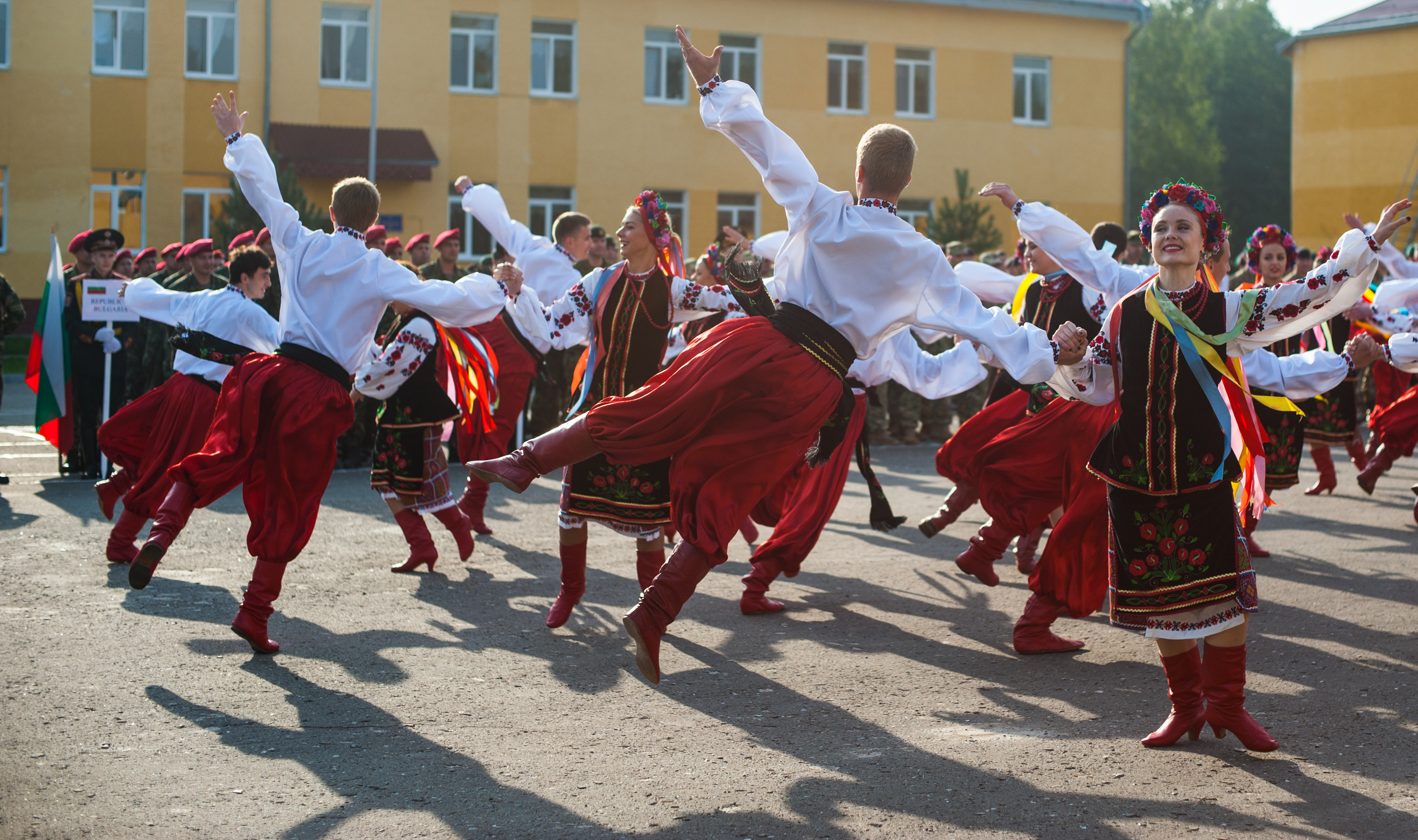
Hopak, a Ukrainian dance

Ukrainian dance refers to the traditional folk dances of the peoples of Ukraine. Today, Ukrainian dance is primarily represented by what ethnographers, folklorists, and dance historians refer to as Ukrainian folk-stage dances: stylised representations of traditional dances and their characteristic movements that have been choreographed for concert dance performances. This stylised art form has so permeated the culture of Ukraine that very few purely traditional forms of Ukrainian dance remain today.

Ukrainian dance is often described as energetic, fast-paced, and entertaining, and along with traditional Easter eggs (pysanky), it is a characteristic example of Ukrainian culture recognised and appreciated throughout the world.

=== Symbols ===
Coat of arms of Ukraine

Flag of Ukraine

Ukraine's national symbols include its flag and its coat of arms.

The national flag of Ukraine is a blue and yellow bicolour rectangle, with the colour fields of the same form and equal size and the colours representing a blue sky above yellow fields of wheat. The flag was designed for the convention of the Supreme Ruthenian Council, meeting in Lviv in October 1848. Its colours were based on the coat-of-arms of the Kingdom of Ruthenia.

The coat of arms of Ukraine features the same colours found on the Ukrainian flag: a blue shield with yellow trident—the symbol of ancient East Slavic tribes that once lived in Ukraine and later adopted by Ruthenian and Kievan Rus' rulers.

== See also ==
- Demographics of Ukraine
- List of Ukrainians
- Population transfer in the Soviet Union
- Ukrainian dialects

== Bibliography ==
=== Primary sources ===
- Galician–Volhynian Chronicle (c. 1292)
  - Perfecky, George A. (1973). The Hypatian Codex Part Two: The Galician–Volynian Chronicle. An annotated translation by George A. Perfecky. Munich: Wilhelm Fink Verlag. OCLC 902306.
  - Makhnovets, Leonid (1989). Літопис Руський за Іпатським списком [Rus' Chronicle according to the Hypatian Codex] (in Ukrainian). Kyiv: Dnipro. p. 591. ISBN 5-308-00052-2. — A modern annotated Ukrainian translation of the Galician–Volhynian Chronicle based on the Hypatian Codex with comments from the Khlebnikov Codex.

=== Literature ===
- Magocsi, Paul R. (1996). A History of Ukraine. Toronto: University of Toronto Press. ISBN 978-0-300-09309-4.
- Wilson, Andrew (2002). The Ukrainians: Unexpected Nation (2nd ed.). New Haven, Connecticut: Yale University Press. ISBN 978-0-300-09309-4.

=== Further reading ===
- Vasyl Balushok, "How Rusyns Became Ukrainians", Zerkalo Nedeli (the Mirror Weekly), July 2005. Available in Russian and in Ukrainian.
- Vasyl Balushok, "When was the Ukrainian nation born?", Zerkalo Nedeli (the Mirror Weekly), 23 April – 6 May 2005. Available in Russian and in Ukrainian.
- Dmytro Kyianskyi, "We are more "Russian" then they are: history without myths and sensationalism", Zerkalo Nedeli (the Mirror Weekly), 27 January – 2 February 2001. Available in Russian and in Ukrainian.
- Oleg Chirkov, "External migration – the main reason for the presence of a non-Ukrainian ethnic population in contemporary Ukraine". Zerkalo Nedeli (the Mirror Weekly), 26 January – 1 February 2002. Available in Russian and in Ukrainian.
- Halyna Lozko, "Ukrainian ethnology. Ethnographic division of Ukraine" Available in Ukrainian Archived 7 April 2022 at the Wayback Machine.
