= Ihor Kharchenko =

Ukrainian diplomat

- Ігор Харченко
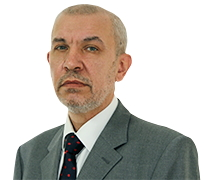

Ambassador of Ukraine to Japan
- In office 2013–2020
- Prime Minister: Arseniy Yatsenyuk
- Preceded by: Mykola Kulinich
- Succeeded by: Sergiy Korsunsky
- President: Petro Poroshenko

Ambassador of Ukraine to the United Kingdom
- In office 2006–2010
- President: Viktor Yushchenko
- Preceded by: Ihor Mityukov
- Succeeded by: Volodymyr Khandohiy

Ambassador of Ukraine to Poland
- In office 2003–2006
- President: Leonid Kuchma
- Preceded by: Oleksandr Nikonenko
- Succeeded by: Olexander Motsyk

Ambassador of Ukraine to Romania
- In office 1998–2000
- President: Leonid Kuchma
- Preceded by: Oleksandr Chaly
- Succeeded by: Anton Buteyko

Personal details
- Born: 15 May 1962 (age 64) Kyiv, Ukrainian SSR, Soviet Union
- Education: Taras Shevchenko National University of Kyiv

Ihor Kharchenko (born May 15, 1962) is a Ukrainian diplomat: an Ambassador Extraordinary and Plenipotentiary of Ukraine.

== Education ==
Ihor Kharchenko graduated from Taras Shevchenko National University of Kyiv in 1985 with a degree in international relations and obtained a doctorate in historical science in 1988.

== Career ==
Kharchenko began his diplomatic career in 1992, serving as a First Secretary, Counsellor, and later as the Director of the Department of Policy Analysis and Planning at the Ministry of Foreign Affairs of Ukraine until 1997. From 1997 to 1998, he served as the Deputy Permanent Representative of Ukraine to the United Nations and was the Chief of Staff for the Office of the President of the UN General Assembly.

He was appointed as the Ambassador Extraordinary and Plenipotentiary of Ukraine to Romania in 1998, a position he held until 2000. Following this, he served as the Deputy Minister of Foreign Affairs of Ukraine, Deputy State Secretary, and the Special Envoy of Ukraine to the Balkans between 2000 and 2003. From 2003 to 2006, he was the Ambassador of Ukraine to Poland.

In 2006, Kharchenko was appointed as the Ambassador of Ukraine to the United Kingdom and the Permanent Representative of Ukraine to the International Maritime Organization, serving until 2010. He then served as the Special Representative of Ukraine for the Transnistrian Settlement from 2010 to 2013. His final diplomatic posting was as the Ambassador of Ukraine to Japan, where he served from 2013 to 2020.
