= Anton Buteyko =

Ukrainian diplomat (1947–2019)

- Антон Бутейко
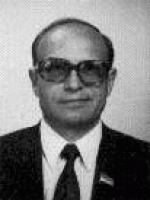
- Buteyko in 1994

Ambassador of Ukraine to Romania
- In office 2000–2003
- Preceded by: Ihor Kharchenko
- Succeeded by: Teofil Bauer
- President: Leonid Kuchma

Ambassador of Ukraine to the United States
- In office 1998–1999
- President: Leonid Kuchma
- Preceded by: Yuriy Shcherbak
- Succeeded by: Kostyantyn Gryshchenko

People's Deputy of Ukraine

2nd convocation
- In office May 11, 1994 – January 16, 1997
- Constituency: Independent, Volyn Oblast, District No.70

Personal details
- Born: April 6, 1947 Staryi Chortoryisk
- Died: March 10, 2019 (aged 71)
- Education: Kiev University

Anton Denysovych Buteyko (Ukrainian: Антон Денисович Бутейко; 6 April 1947 – 10 March 2019) was a Ukrainian diplomat. Ambassador Extraordinary and Plenipotentiary of Ukraine to the United States (1998-1999). Ambassador Extraordinary and Plenipotentiary of Ukraine to Romania (2000-2003). People's Deputy of Ukraine (1994-1998).

== Education ==
Anton Buteyko graduated from Taras Shevchenko National University of Kyiv in 1974.

== Career ==
1974—1976 — attache, 1976—1977 — Third Secretary, 1977—1978 — Second Secretary of the Department of International Organizations

1978—1980 — First Secretary of the General Secretariat of the Ministry of Foreign Affairs.

1980—1986 — member of the Secretariat of the United Nations, New York City.

1986—1990 — adviser to international organizations

1990—1991 — head contractual and legal department of Ministry of Foreign Affairs of the Ukrainian SSR.

1991 — Chairman of a special international commission to create the International Tribunal for the Law of the Sea.

12.1991 — 09.1994 — Advisor to the President of Ukraine, Ukraine Managing Office of International Affairs.

10.1995—11.1998 — First Deputy Minister of Foreign Affairs of Ukraine.

11.1998—12.1999 — Ambassador Extraordinary and Plenipotentiary of Ukraine to the United States.

02.2000 — Ambassador at Large MFA of Ukraine.

2000—2003 — Ambassador Extraordinary and Plenipotentiary of Ukraine to Romania.

12.12.2003 — Vice President of the Association of Ukrainian banks.

2005 — First Deputy Minister of Foreign Affairs of Ukraine.

March 10, 2019 - Died.
