= Mykola Kulinich =

Ukrainian diplomat (born 1953)

- Микола Кулінич
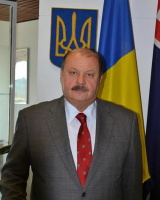

Ambassador of Ukraine to Australia
- Incumbent
- Assumed office 2015
- Preceded by: Valentin Adomaitis
- President: Petro Poroshenko; Volodymyr Zelenskyy

Ambassador of Ukraine to Japan
- In office 2007–2013
- President: Viktor Yushchenko; Viktor Yanukovych
- Preceded by: Volodymyr Makukha
- Succeeded by: Ihor Kharchenko

Personal details
- Born: 19 July 1953 (age 73) Kyiv, Ukrainian SSR, USSR
- Education: Kiev University

Mykola Andriiovych Kulinich (Ukrainian: Микола Андрійович Кулінич; born 19 July 1953) is a Ukrainian diplomat. Ambassador Extraordinary and Plenipotentiary of Ukraine.

== Education ==
Mykola Kulinich graduated from Taras Shevchenko National University of Kyiv in 1976, master's Degree in International Relations; Post-Graduate Course in History of International Relations, Kyiv State University (1979). Doctoral Degree (Ph. D.) in History of International Relations (1982).

== Professional development ==
In 1994 research Fellow, University of Maryland (United States) and SAIS of Johns Hopkins University, Washington D.C. (USA).

From 2003 to 2007 Professor, Institute of International relations, Taras Shevchenko National University of Kyiv.

From 2003 to 2007 Professor, Head of Chair. Chair of Foreign Policy and Diplomacy, Diplomatic Academy of Ukraine, Kyiv.

In 2005 Harvard University, John F. Kennedy School of Government. Black Sea Security Program. Cambridge – Boston (USA).

In 2005 Research Fellow. Japan Institute of International Affairs, Tokyo, Japan.

From 2007 to 2012 Member of Advisory Board, Ritsumeikan Asia Pacific University (APU), Beppu, Japan

== Professional career ==
From 1979 to 1988 Assistant, Senior Lecturer, the Department of International Relations and International Law, Taras Shevchenko National University of Kyiv.

From 1988 to 1991 Associate Professor, the Department of International Relations and International Law, Taras Shevchenko National University of Kyiv.

From 1992 to 1994 Professor Head of Chair, Chair of International Organizations and Diplomatic Service Institute of International Relations, Taras Shevchenko National University of Kyiv.

From 1991 to 1994 First Deputy Director Institute of International Relations Taras Shevchenko National University of Kyiv.

From 1994 to 1997 Counsellor Embassy of Ukraine in Japan, Tokyo.

From 1997 to 1998 Minister – Counsellor Embassy of Ukraine in Japan, Tokyo.

From 1998 to 2001 Deputy Director 5-th Territorial Directorate (Asia-Pacific, Middle East and Africa), Ministry of Foreign Affairs of Ukraine, Kyiv.

From 2001 to 2003 Minister – Counsellor Embassy of Ukraine in the Republic of Korea, Seoul.

Nov 2003 – Jan 2007 Rector Diplomatic Academy of Ukraine, Ministry of Foreign Affairs of Ukraine.

Feb 2007 – Feb 2013 Ambassador of Ukraine to Japan

March 2013 – Nov 2015 Rector Diplomatic Academy of Ukraine, Ministry of Foreign Affairs of Ukraine.

Since November 2015 Ambassador of Ukraine in Australia.
