= Embassy of Ukraine, Canberra =

Ukrainian embassy in Australia

Embassy of Ukraine in Australia
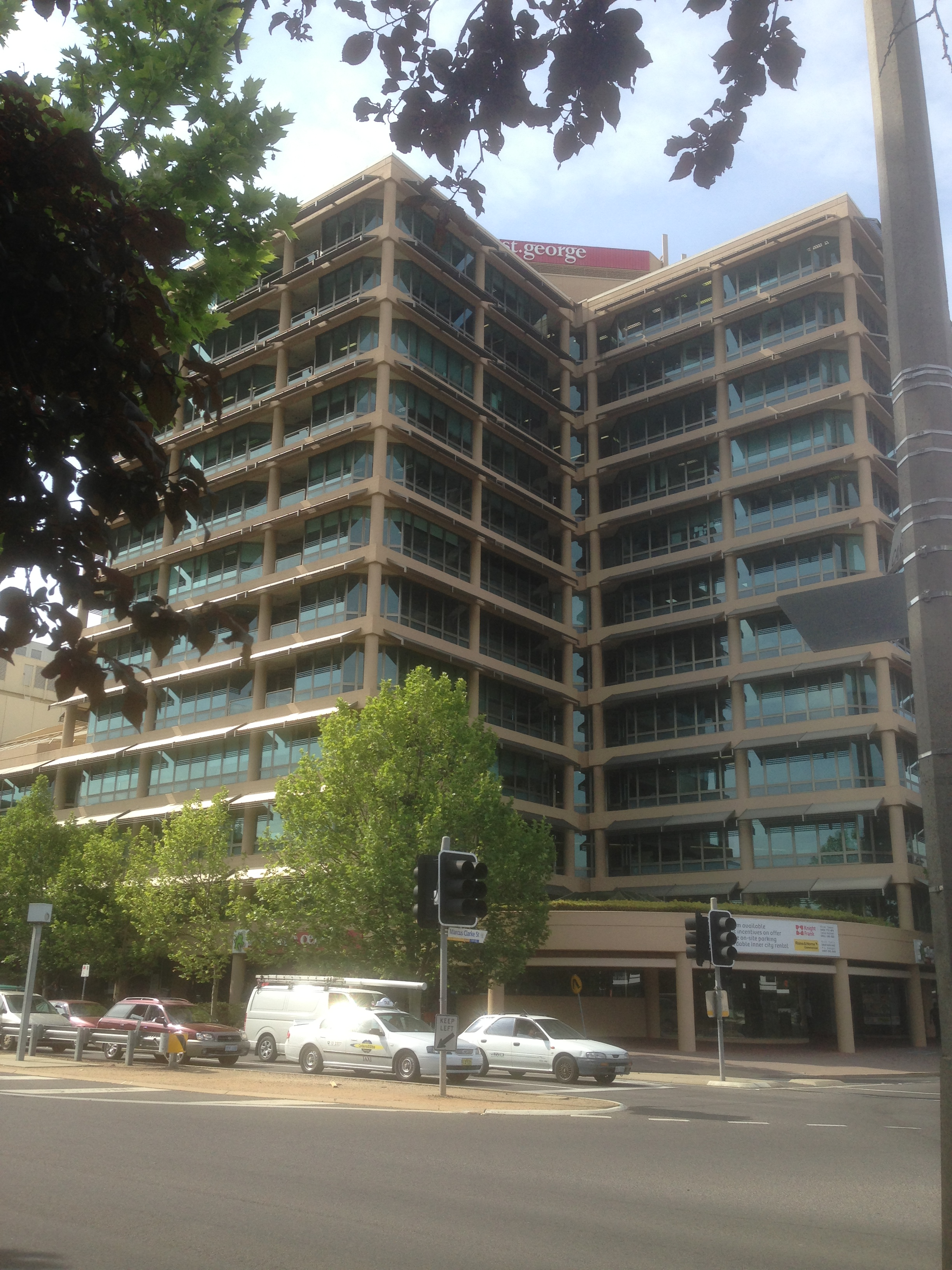
- Location: Canberra, Australian Capital Territory
- Address: Level 12, 1/60 Marcus Clarke Street
- Ambassador: Vasyl Myroshnychenko
- Website: https://australia.mfa.gov.ua/en

The Embassy of Ukraine in Australia is the diplomatic mission of Ukraine in Australia, located in Canberra. The embassy also holds non-resident accreditation for New Zealand.

== History ==
Ukraine established diplomatic relations with Australia on 10 January 1992. Diplomatic relations with New Zealand were established on 3 March 1992. From 1993, Ukraine's interests in Australia have been represented by Honorary Consuls of Ukraine in Melbourne (Zina Botte, and later by Valeriy Botte). By 1999, Ukraine was actively lobbying for its Honorary Consulate to be upgraded to an embassy, with diplomat Ihor Lytvyn visiting Canberra in order to meet with Australian politicians about the idea. In May 2000 the consulate general was established in Canberra. The embassy in Australia was opened on 14 April 2003.

== Ambassadors ==
Name	Start of term	End of term	Notes
Alexander Pavlovich Mishchenko	2 August 2004	22 August 2005	Chargé d'Affaires Apr 2003 to Aug 2004.
Valentin Vladimirovich Adomaitis	7 March 2007	30 May 2011	
Stanislav Sergeevich Stashevsky	1 June 2011	30 May 2014	Chargé d'Affaires
Mykola Petrovich Jidjora	1 June 2014	24 September 2015	Chargé d'Affaires
Mykola Kulinich	24 September 2015	6 October 2021	
Volodymyr Shalkivskyi	10 December 2021	26 March 2022	Chargé d'Affaires
Vasyl Myroshnychenko	26 March 2022	present	
