= Yuri Hasenko =

Ukrainian journalist, writer and diplomat

Yuri Hasenko Юрій Гасенко
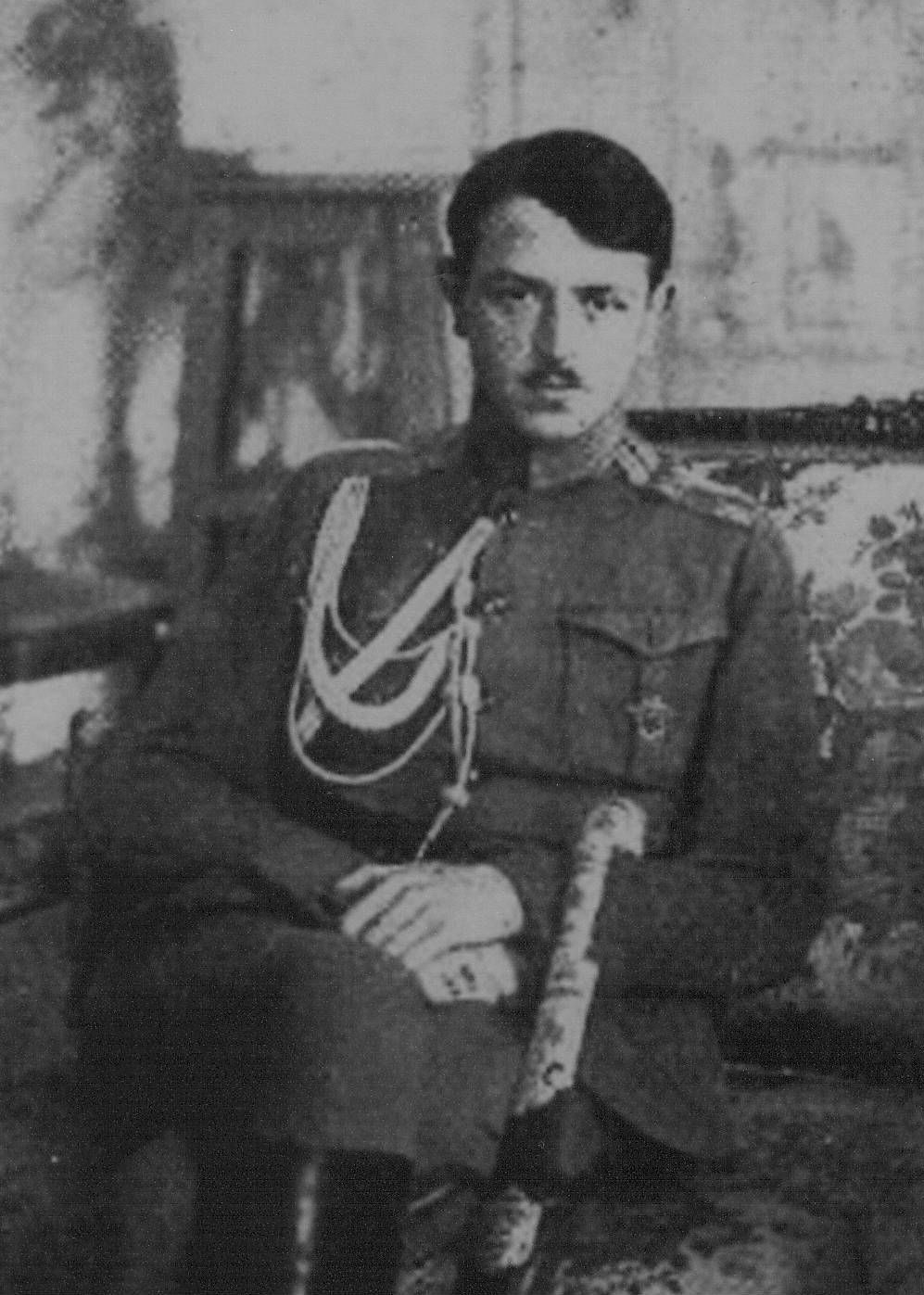

Ambassador of Ukraine to Romania
- In office 1919–1920
- Preceded by: Volodyslav Dashkevych-Horbatsky
- Succeeded by: Kostiantyn Matsiyevych

Personal details
- Born: 1894
- Died: 1933 (aged 38–39)
- Party: Paris

Yuri Hasenko (Ukrainian: Юрій Гасенко; 1894 – 1933) was a Ukrainian diplomat, journalist, and writer. He was member of the Union of Ukrainian Journalists and Writers in Vienna.

== Professional career and experience ==
In 1917 – he was personal Adjutant General Secretary of Military Affairs Symon Petliura. The following year – a member of the Ukrainian delegation at the peace negotiations in Brest. 14 December 1917, General Secretariat of the Ukrainian People's Republic issued mandate to Yuri Hasenko to perform special mission abroad. He managed to carry out a number of important events of diplomatic and intelligence character in Vienna, Berlin, Paris, London, Rome, Washington and some other capitals. In 1919–1920 – he was associate Ukrainian Embassy in Romania. Then in exile in Germany and Czechoslovakia. On 11 March 1920 – he was chairman of the Ukrainian national flying club in Vienna.

== Authored works ==
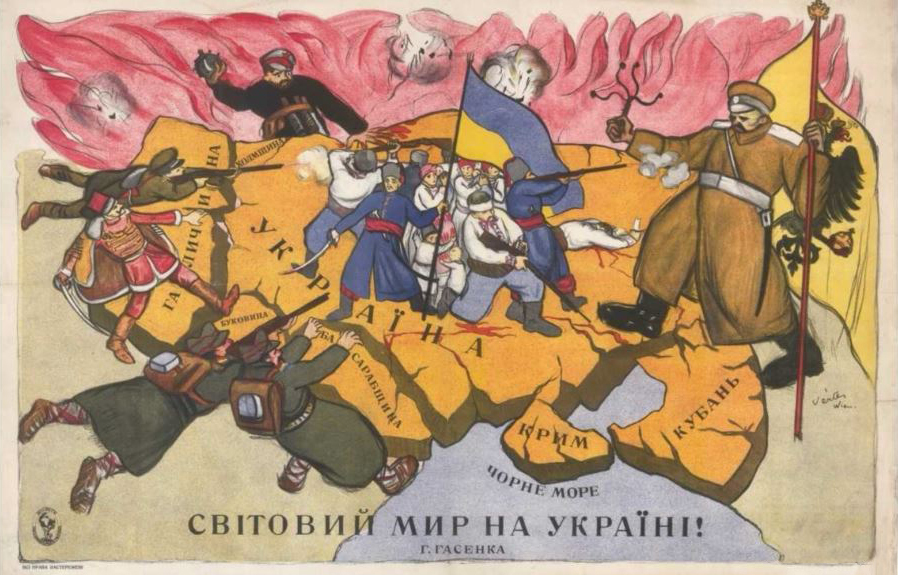
A 1919 caricature related to the Paris Peace Conference by Hasenko

- Ist Cholmland polnisch oder ukrainisch? Lausanne, 1918 (Le Pays du Cholm. Est il polonais ou ukrainien? Lausanne, 1918).
- Les Etats-Unis de la Mer Noire. Vienne-Bucarest, 1918.
- Feuille à ajouter au Dictionnaire encyclopédique Larousse, page 1630, au mot Ukraine d'après les dernières données de la science. Bucarest, 1919.
- A qui doit appartenir la Bucovine? (1919)
- La République Ukrainienne, son histoire, sa géographie et sa vie économique. Bucarest, 1919 (Republica Ucrainiasă. Teritoriul, populația, viața economică. București, 1919).
- Die Ukraina in ihren ethnographischen Grenzen. Wien, [o.J.]
- L'Ukraine, carte comparative géographique, écomomique, étnographique. Bucarest, 1919
- The Republic of Ukraine (1919)
