= Leontiy Sandulyak =

Ukrainian political figure, scientist and diplomat (1937–2023)

Leontiy Sandulyak was a Ukrainian public figure and diplomat, notably recognized as a co-author of the Act of Declaration of Independence of Ukraine. Born on March 8, 1937, in the village of Koziryany, now part of the Kelmensky District in the Chernivtsi Region, Sandulyak made significant contributions not just in the political arena but also in science. He was a distinguished scientist in histology, endocrinology, ecology, and valeology and held a Doctor of Medical Sciences degree and a professorship. On August 23, 1991, Sandulyak, in collaboration with Levko Lukyanenko, wrote the Act of Declaration of Independence of Ukraine, a pivotal document that has become the cornerstone of Ukraine's sovereignty. This act marked him as a key architect of modern Ukraine.

== Biography ==
He was born on 8 March 1937 in a family of farmers in the village of Kozyryany (now Kelmenetski district, Chernivtsi Oblast). Histology, endocrinology, ecology, and valeology were among his specialties. His vast expertise and unwavering devotion to his nation garnered him recognition. He possessed a Doctor of Medical Sciences degree and a professorship. Sandulyak played a crucial role in shaping modern Ukraine. Alongside Levko Lukyanenko, he co-authored the Act of Declaration of Independence of Ukraine on August 23, 1991. This document is considered the cornerstone of Ukraine's sovereignty and highlights Sandulyak's pivotal role as a key architect of the nation's independence. In addition to his accomplishments at home, Sandulyak had a big impact abroad. He played a pivotal role in building Ukraine's worldwide profile as the country's first extraordinary and plenipotentiary ambassador to Romania. The city of Chernivtsi acknowledged his outstanding accomplishments by making him an honorary citizen, demonstrating the wide-ranging influence of his work.

== Education ==
Sandulyak's educational journey began at the Koziryanska seven-year school, which he completed in 1952. He then attended the Chernivtsi Feldsher-Midwife School (1956) and graduated from the Chernivtsi Medical Institute in 1965. He completed his postgraduate studies at the Department of Histology and defended his candidate dissertation in 1969. Additionally, he underwent scientific training at the Parhon Institute of Endocrinology in Bucharest, Romania (1974–1975) and had a training stint at the University of Saskatchewan in Canada (1986). In 1983, he defended his doctoral dissertation on "Erythrocytes as a depot and transport system of insulin". In 1983, he discovered the previously unknown property of erythrocytes to deposit and transport insulin. In 1986, he was doing an internship at the University of Saskatchewan.
