= Minister of Foreign Affairs (Ukraine) =

Ukrainian government minister

Minister of Foreign Affairs of Ukraine
- Міністр закордонних справ України

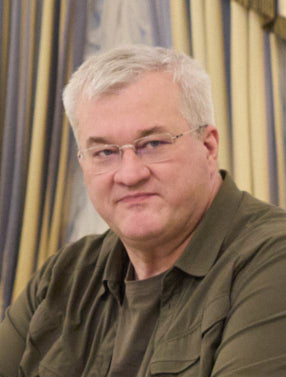
- Incumbent; Andrii Sybiha since 5 September 2024; acting minister since mid-July 2026
- Appointer: President of Ukraine
- Term length: No fixed term
- Inaugural holder: Anatoliy Zlenko
- Formation: 24 August 1991
- Succession: First deputy minister

The minister of foreign affairs (Ukrainian: Міністр закордонних справ) is the foreign minister of Ukraine and head of the Ministry of Foreign Affairs, which is in charge of the diplomatic corps and realization of the foreign policy of Ukraine. The minister of foreign affairs is appointed by the president.

Since Ukrainian independence from the Soviet Union in 1991, the nation has had 14 foreign ministers (not including acting ones). During the Ukrainian chairmanship of the Organization for Security and Co-operation in Europe in 2013, the Ukrainian foreign minister at that time (Leonid Kozhara) served as Chairman-in-Office of the OSCE.

== List of ministers of foreign affairs ==
=== Ukrainian People's Republic ===
No.	Portrait	Name	Took office	Left office	President of Central Rada
1		Oleksander Shulhyn	9 January 1918	24 January 1918	Mykhailo Hrushevskyi
2		Vsevolod Holubovych	30 January 1918	3 March 1918	Mykhailo Hrushevskyi
3		Mykola Liubynskyi	3 March 1918	28 April 1918	Mykhailo Hrushevskyi

=== Ukrainian State ===
No.	Portrait	Name	Took office	Left office	Hetman
-		Mykola Vasylenko	30 April 1918	20 May 1918 (acting)	Pavlo Skoropadskyi
1		Dmytro Doroshenko	20 May 1918	14 November 1918	Pavlo Skoropadskyi
2		Georgiy Afanasyev	14 November 1918	14 December 1918	Pavlo Skoropadskyi

=== Ukrainian People's Republic (restored) ===
No.	Portrait	Name	Took office	Left office	Head of Directorate
1		Volodymyr Chekhivskyi	26 December 1918	11 February 1919	Volodymyr Vynnychenko
2		Kostiantyn Matsiyevych	13 February 1919	9 April 1919	Symon Petliura
3		Volodymyr Temnytskyi	9 April 1919	27 August 1919	Symon Petliura
-		Andriy Livytskyi	29 August 1919	26 May 1920 (acting)	Symon Petliura
4		Andriy Nikovskyi	26 May 1920	10 November 1920	Symon Petliura

=== Ukrainian Socialist Soviet Republic (people's commissars) ===
No.	Portrait	Name	Took office	Left office	First Secretary
-		Stepan Vlasenko	28 November 1918	January 1919 (Head of the International department of the Provisional Workers' and Peasants' Government of Ukraine)	Emanuel Kviring
1		Christian Rakovsky	29 January 1919	July 1919	Georgy Pyatakov
2		unknown	July 1919	21 March 1920	Stanislav Kosior
3		Christian Rakovsky	21 March 1920	July 1923	Stanislav Kosior

=== Ukrainian National Government (1941) ===
No.	Portrait	Name	Took office	Left office	Head of Ukrainian National Government
-		Volodymyr Stakhiv	30 June 1941	12 July 1941	Yaroslav Stetsko

=== Soviet Ukraine (postwar) ===
No.	Portrait	Name	Took office	Left office	First Secretary
1		Oleksandr Korniychuk	5 February 1944	12 July 1944 (people's commissar)	Nikita Khrushchev
2		Dmitry Manuilsky	12 July 1944 (before 15 March 1946 – people's commissar)	10 June 1952	Nikita Khrushchev
3		Anatoliy Baranovsky	10 June 1952	10 May 1954	Leonid Melnikov
4		Luka Palamarchuk	11 May 1954	13 August 1965	Alexei Kirichenko
4		Luka Palamarchuk	11 May 1954	13 August 1965	Nikolai Podgorny
4		Luka Palamarchuk	11 May 1954	13 August 1965	Petro Shelest
-		Anatoliy Kysil	13 August 1965	16 March 1966	Petro Shelest
5		Dmytro Bilokolos	16 March 1966	11 June 1970	Petro Shelest
-		unknown	11 June 1970	5 August 1970	Petro Shelest
6		Georgiy Shevel	5 August 1970	18 November 1980	Petro Shelest
6		Georgiy Shevel	5 August 1970	18 November 1980	Volodymyr Shcherbytsky
7		Volodymyr Martynenko	18 November 1980	28 December 1984	Volodymyr Shcherbytsky
8		Volodymyr Kravets	29 December 1984	27 July 1990	Volodymyr Shcherbytsky
8		Volodymyr Kravets	29 December 1984	27 July 1990	Volodymyr Ivashko
8		Volodymyr Kravets	29 December 1984	27 July 1990	Stanislav Hurenko
9		Anatoliy Zlenko	27 July 1990	24 August 1991	Stanislav Hurenko

=== Ministers after independence ===
No.	Portrait	Name	Took office	Left office	President(s)
1		Anatoliy Zlenko	24 August 1991	25 August 1994	Leonid Kravchuk
-		Hennadiy Udovenko	25 August 1994	16 September 1994	Leonid Kuchma
2		Hennadiy Udovenko	16 September 1994	17 April 1998	Leonid Kuchma
3		Borys Tarasiuk	17 April 1998	29 September 2000	Leonid Kuchma
-		Oleksandr Chalyi	29 September 2000	2 October 2000	Leonid Kuchma
4		Anatoliy Zlenko	2 October 2000	2 September 2003	Leonid Kuchma
5		Kostyantyn Gryshchenko	2 September 2003	3 February 2005	Leonid Kuchma
6		Borys Tarasiuk	4 February 2005	1 December 2006	Viktor Yushchenko
-		Anton Buteyko	1 December 2006	5 December 2006	Viktor Yushchenko
-		Borys Tarasiuk	5 December 2006	30 January 2007	Viktor Yushchenko
-		Volodymyr Ohryzko	31 January 2007	21 March 2007	Viktor Yushchenko
7		Arseniy Yatseniuk	21 March 2007	18 December 2007	Viktor Yushchenko
8		Volodymyr Ohryzko	18 December 2007	3 March 2009	Viktor Yushchenko
-		Volodymyr Khandohiy	3 March 2009	9 October 2009	Viktor Yushchenko
9		Petro Poroshenko	9 October 2009	11 March 2010	Viktor Yushchenko
10		Kostyantyn Gryshchenko	11 March 2010	24 December 2012	Viktor Yanukovych
11		Leonid Kozhara	24 December 2012	23 February 2014	Viktor Yanukovych
-		Andrii Deshchytsia	27 February 2014	19 June 2014	Oleksandr Turchynov
12		Pavlo Klimkin	19 June 2014	29 August 2019	Petro Poroshenko
13		Vadym Prystaiko	29 August 2019	4 March 2020	Volodymyr Zelenskyy
14		Dmytro Kuleba	4 March 2020	5 September 2024	Volodymyr Zelenskyy
15		Andrii Sybiha	5 September 2024	incumbent; acting foreign minister since July 2026	Volodymyr Zelenskyy
