= List of ambassadors of Russia to Botswana =

Ambassador of the Russian Federation to the Republic of Botswana
- Emblem of the Russian Foreign Ministry
- Incumbent; Andrey Kemarsky since 28 October 2020
- Ministry of Foreign Affairs; Embassy of Russia in Gaborone
- Style: His Excellency; The Honourable
- Reports to: Minister of Foreign Affairs
- Seat: Gaborone
- Appointer: President of Russia
- Term length: At the pleasure of the president
- Formation: 1970
- First holder: Dmytro Bilokolos
- Website: Embassy of Russia in Botswana

The ambassador extraordinary and plenipotentiary of the Russian Federation to the Republic of Botswana is the official representative of the president and the government of the Russian Federation to the president and the government of Botswana.

The ambassador and his staff work at large in the Embassy of Russia in Gaborone. The post of Russian ambassador to Botswana is currently held by Andrey Kemarsky, incumbent since 28 October 2020.

== History of diplomatic relations ==
Diplomatic relations between the Soviet Union and Botswana were established on 6 March 1970. Relations were initially handled through the embassy in Zambia, with the Soviet ambassador to Zambia, Dmytro Bilokolos, concurrently accredited to Botswana. The Soviet embassy was opened in Botswana's capital, Gaborone, in August 1976. Following Bilokolos's recall on 23 June 1976, relations with Botswana were handled by the chargé d'affaires, until the appointment of Mikhail Petrov as the new ambassador to Botswana on 21 December 1977. With the dissolution of the Soviet Union in 1991, the Soviet ambassador, Boris Asoyan, continued as representative of the Russian Federation until 1992.

== List of representatives (1970–present) ==
=== Soviet Union to Botswana (1970–1991) ===
Name	Title	Appointment	Termination	Notes
Dmytro Bilokolos	Ambassador	16 September 1970	23 June 1976	Concurrently Soviet ambassador to Zambia
	Chargé d'affaires	23 June 1976	21 December 1977	
Mikhail Petrov	Ambassador	21 December 1977	5 April 1985	
Viktor Krivda	Ambassador	5 April 1985	10 August 1990	
Boris Asoyan	Ambassador	10 August 1990	25 December 1991	

=== Russian Federation to Botswana (1991–present) ===
Name	Title	Appointment	Termination	Notes
Boris Asoyan	Ambassador	25 December 1991	December 1992	
Vladimir Yukhin	Ambassador	24 November 1993	19 November 1998	
Valery Kalugin	Ambassador	19 November 1998	29 September 2003	
Igor Lyakin-Frolov	Ambassador	29 September 2003	29 February 2008	
Anatoly Korsun	Ambassador	29 February 2008	6 August 2014	
Viktor Sibilev	Ambassador	6 August 2014	28 October 2020	
Andrey Kemarsky	Ambassador	28 October 2020		
