= Embassy of Ukraine, Tallinn =

Diplomatic mission of Ukraine to Estonia

Embassy of Ukraine in Tallinn
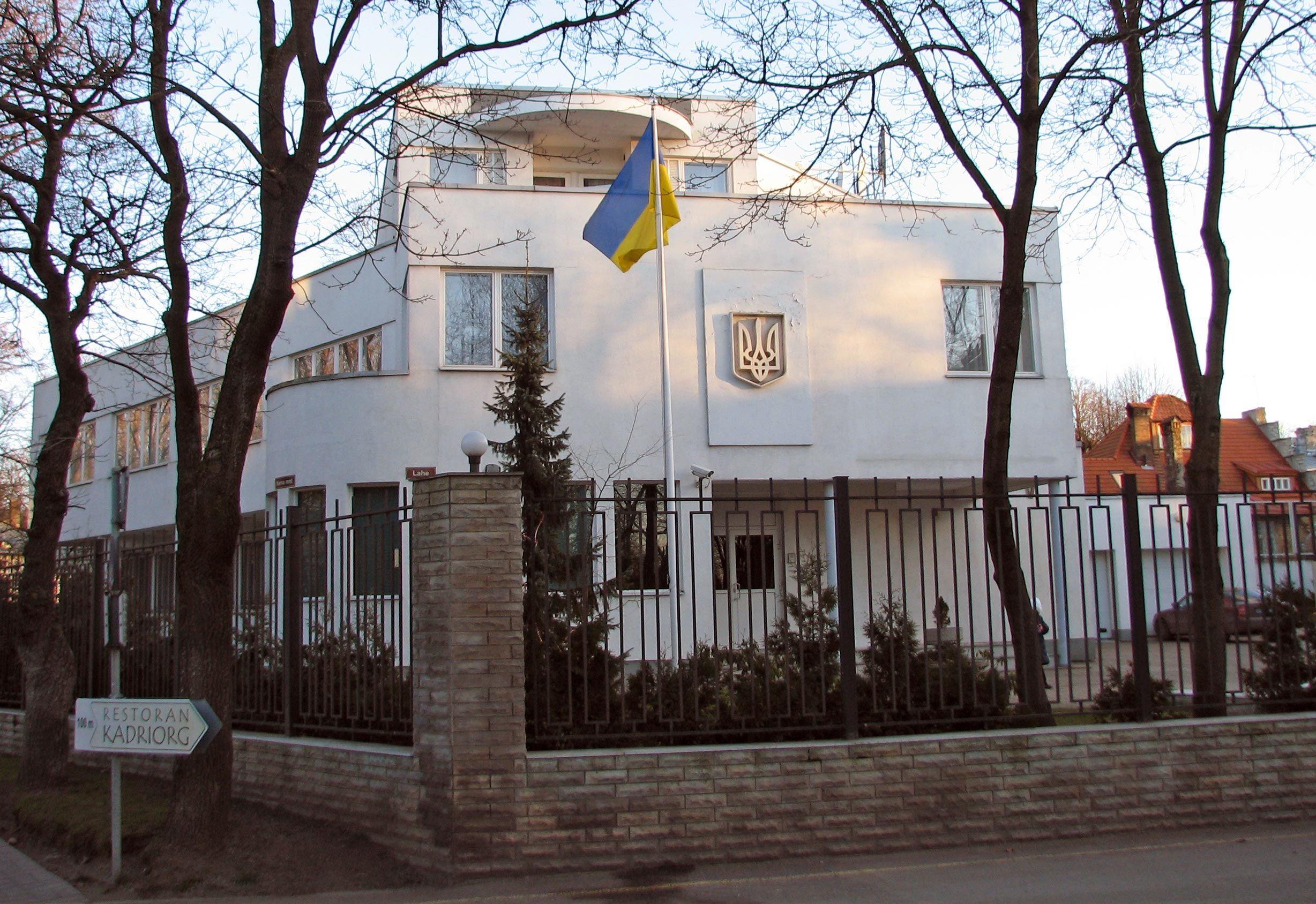
- Location: Tallinn
- Address: Lahe 6 Tallinn, 15170, Estonia
- Coordinates: 59°26′23.13″N 24°47′2.56″E
- Ambassador: Mariana Betsa

Embassy of Ukraine in Tallinn is the diplomatic mission of Ukraine in Estonia.

== History ==
Following independence, Ukraine August 24, 1991 Estonia proclaimed Ukraine December 6, 1991. January 3, 1992 between Ukraine and Estonia was established diplomatic relations. The basis for future bilateral relations was signed on 26 May 1992 Treaty of Friendship and Cooperation between Ukraine and Estonia. October 1, 1993 in Tallinn started the Embassy of Ukraine in Estonia.

== Previous Ambassadors ==
1. Volodymyr Kedrovskiy (1919-1921)
2. Mikhaylo Parashchuk (1921)
3. Evgen Golitsynskii (1921)
4. Evgen Terletsky (1921-1923)
5. Viktor Hladush (1992-1993)
6. Yuriy Olenenko (1993-1999)
7. Mykola Makarevich (1999-2005)
8. Pavlo Kiriakov (2005-2010)
9. Volodymyr Reshetnyak (2010), chargé d'Affaires ad interim
10. Viktor Kryzhanivsky (2010-2017)
11. Vasyl Yakovenko (2017-2018), chargé d'Affaires ad interim
12. Mariana Betsa (2018-)

== See also ==
- Ukraine–Estonia relations
- Foreign relations of Estonia
- List of diplomatic missions of Estonia
- Foreign relations of Ukraine
- Diplomatic missions of Ukraine
