= Betsi =

Betsi is a given name. Notable people with the given name include:

- Betsi Cadwaladr (1789–1860), Welsh nurse
- Betsi DeVries (born 1955), American politician
- Betsi Rivas (born 1986), Venezuelan weightlifter

== See also ==
- Betsy, another given name
- Betsa, a surname
