= Viacheslav Yatsiuk =

Ukrainian diplomat

Viacheslav Yatsiuk Вячеслав Вікторович Яцюк
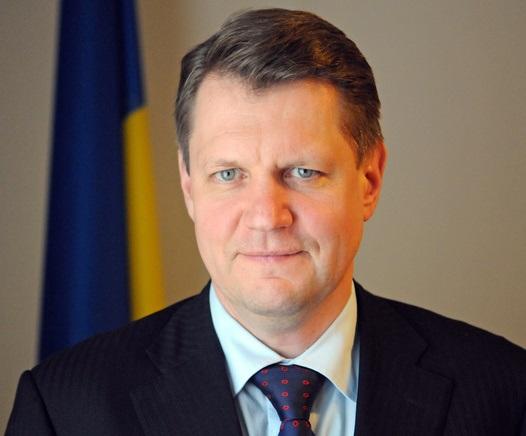
- Born: 11 September 1969 (age 56)
- Education: Taras Shevchenko National University of Kyiv
- Occupation: Ukrainian diplomat

Viacheslav Yatsiuk (Ukrainian: Вячеслав Вікторович Яцюк) (born 11 September 1969) is a Ukrainian career diplomat with more than 25 years of professional experience in both bilateral and multilateral diplomacy.

== Early life and education ==
Viacheslav Yatsiuk was born in Chernihiv region, Ukraine on 11 September 1969. Since 1971 he has been living in Kyiv. A substantial part of his military service in 1987-1989 as a paratrooper he served in Afghanistan. In 1995 he graduated from the Institute of International Relations of Taras Shevchenko National University of Kyiv with distinction. Mr Yatsiuk is married, and has a son and daughter.

== Career ==
Viacheslav Yatsiuk began his diplomatic service in the Department of International Organizations of the Ministry of Foreign Affairs of Ukraine. From 1997 to 2000 he was posted to New York where he worked in the Permanent Mission of Ukraine to the United Nations. From 1997 to 1998 he acted as advisor for political affairs to the President of the 52nd session of the UN General Assembly. When Ukraine was elected as a non-permanent member of the UN Security Council for the 2000-2001 term, he served as his country's alternate representative on this body.

From 2000 to 2005 he held various diplomatic positions in the Foreign Policy Directorate within the Administration of the President of Ukraine. In particular, from 2002 to 2004 he worked as Head of the Department for European and Euro-Atlantic Integration, and in September 2004 he was appointed Deputy Head of the Foreign Policy Directorate. During that period Mr Yatsiuk was a member of a number of intergovernmental structures, including the Committee on Co-operation between Ukraine and the European Union, the Ukrainian-American Foreign Policy Committee, the Ukrainian-British Consultative Mechanism and some others.

From 2005 till 2009 he was posted to London where he worked as Counsellor, and later as Minister Counsellor of the Embassy of Ukraine in the United Kingdom. From 2009 till 2012 he served as Minister Counsellor of the Embassy of Ukraine in the Russian Federation.

In August 2012 Mr Yatsiuk was appointed Political Director General of the Ministry of Foreign Affairs of Ukraine. In 2012-2013 as Head of the OSCE Chairmanship Task Force he coordinated the activities relating to Ukraine's 2013 OSCE Chairmanship. As secretary of a relevant interagency committee set by the Government of Ukraine, he was responsible for organizing the 20th OSCE Ministerial Council in Kyiv on 5–6 December 2013.

On 18 June 2016, Viacheslav Yatsiuk was appointed Ambassador Extraordinary and Plenipotentiary of Ukraine to the Kingdom of Norway.

Mr Yatsiuk is awarded the Order of Danylo Halytsky and received a number of other national awards of Ukraine.
