= Kateryna Zelenko =

Ukrainian diplomat (born 1980)

- Катерина Михайлівна Зеленко
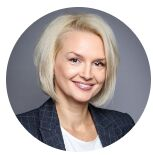

Ambassador of Ukraine to the Republic of Singapore
- Incumbent
- Assumed office 14 November 2020
- President: Volodymyr Zelenskyy
- Preceded by: Dmytro Senik

Spokesperson for the Ministry of Foreign Affairs
- In office November 2018 – November 2020
- Preceded by: Mariana Betsa

Personal details
- Born: 10 August 1980 (age 46) Vinnytsia, Vinnytsia Oblast, Ukrainian SSR (now Ukraine)
- Education: Kyiv University (PhD)

Kateryna Zelenko (Ukrainian: Катерина Михайлівна Зеленко; born 10 August 1980) is a Ukrainian diplomat who served as the spokesperson of the Foreign Ministry of Ukraine between 2018 and 2020. She was appointed as the Ambassador of Ukraine to the Republic of Singapore by President Volodymyr Zelenskyy on 14 November 2020.

== Early life and education ==
Zelenko was born in Vinnytsia, Vinnytsia Oblast on 10 August 1980. She graduated from the Taras Shevchenko National University of Kyiv in 2002. She holds a PhD in international relations, and is an English translator.

== Professional career and experience ==
Since 2002, she has been employed in the diplomatic service of Ukraine. She worked at the Embassy of Ukraine in the Republic of Austria and the Permanent Delegation to international organisations in Vienna, twice as the first secretary of the Embassy of Ukraine in Germany. During the period between foreign travel she occupied various positions in the Department of Personnel, the Department of the European Union and the Political Department of the Ministry of Foreign Affairs of Ukraine.

On 13 November 2020, she was appointed the Ambassador Extraordinary and Plenipotentiary of Ukraine in Singapore. On 13 December 2021 she was also appointed as ambassador to Brunei on a part-time basis. On 22 December 2021, she was assigned the diplomatic rank of Envoy Extraordinary and Plenipotentiary of the second class.
