= Anatoliy Kasyanenko =

Ukrainian politician and diplomat (1942–2021)

- Анатолій Касьяненко
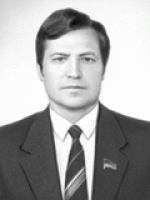

Ambassador of Ukraine in Uzbekistan(Tajikistan/Afghanistan)
- In office 10 January 2000 – 18 August 2005
- Preceded by: Volodymyr Smetanin
- Succeeded by: Vyacheslav Pokhvalskyi

Governor of Kherson Oblast
- In office 7 April 1998 – 15 July 1999
- Preceded by: Mykhaylo Kushnerenko
- Succeeded by: Oleksandr Verbytskyi

Head of State Committee in Tourism
- In office 25 July 1997 – 7 April 1998
- Preceded by: Volodymyr Skrynnyk
- Succeeded by: Valeriy Tsybukh

Ambassador of Ukraine to Georgia
- In office 30 July 1993 – 1 September 1997
- Succeeded by: Stepan Volkovetskyi

Member of the Verkhovna Rada
- In office 18 March 1990 – 30 July 1993

Personal details
- Born: Anatoliy Ivaonovych Kasyanenko; 24 November 1948 Tbilisi, Soviet Union
- Died: 23 July 2021 (aged 72)

Anatoliy Ivanovych Kasyanenko (Ukrainian: Анатолій Іванович Касьяненко; 12 August 1942 – 23 July 2021) was a Ukrainian politician and diplomat. From 1997 to 1998 he headed state agency that is in charge of tourism in Ukraine.

Preceded by revived	Ambassador of Ukraine in Georgia; 1993–1997	Succeeded by Stepan Volkovetskyi
Preceded by Volodymyr Skrynnyk	Head of State Committee in Tourism; 1997–1998	Succeeded by Valeriy Tsybukh
Preceded by Mykhailo Kushnerenko	Governor of Kherson Oblast; 1998–1999	Succeeded by Oleksandr Verbytskyi
Preceded by Volodymyr Smetanin	Ambassador of Ukraine in Uzbekistan (simultaneously in Tajikistan and Afghanistan); 2000–2005	Succeeded by Vyacheslav Pokhvalskyi
