= Betsa =

Betsa is a surname. Notable people with the surname include:

- Mariana Betsa (born 1978), Ukrainian diplomat
- Megan Betsa (born 1995), American softball player and coach
- Stepan Betsa (1970-1992), Soviet and Ukrainian footballer
- Vasyl Betsa (born 1996), Ukrainian footballer
- Yozhef Betsa (1929–2011), Ukrainian and Soviet football player and coach
