= Varvaryntsi =

Rural locality in Ternopil Oblast, Ukraine

Varvaryntsi Варваринці
- Location in Ternopil Oblast
- Coordinates: 49°21′4″N 25°36′20″E
- Country: Ukraine
- Oblast: Ternopil Oblast
- Raion: Ternopil Raion
- Hromada: Mykulyntsi settlement hromada
- Time zone: UTC+2 (EET)
  - Summer (DST): UTC+3 (EEST)
- Postal code: 48126

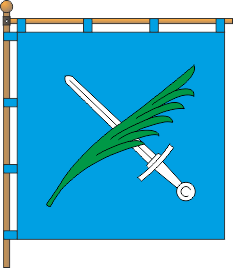
Flag of Varvaryntsi

Varvaryntsi (Ukrainian: Варваринці; Polish: Warwaryńce) is a village in Mykulyntsi settlement hromada, Ternopil Raion, Ternopil Oblast, Ukraine.

== History ==
The first written mention of the village was in 1454.

After the liquidation of the Terebovlia Raion on 19 July 2020, the village became part of the Ternopil Raion.

== Religion ==
- Saint Barbara church (1870, brick, restored in 1990, OCU).

== Notable residents ==
- Mykhailo Parashchuk (1878–1963), Ukrainian sculptor

== Sources ==
- (in Ukrainian) Ониськів М., Яблонська Л., Варваринці // Ternopil Encyclopedic Dictionary: in 4 v. / editorial board: H. Yavorskyi and other, Ternopil: "Zbruch", 2004, V. 1: А—Й, S. 222. — ISBN 966-528-197-6.
- "Warwaryńce". Geographical Dictionary of the Kingdom of Poland (in Polish). 13. Warszawa: Kasa im. Józefa Mianowskiego. 1893. p. 119.
