= Dmytro Kuleba =

Ukrainian politician and diplomat (born 1981)

- Дмитро Кулеба
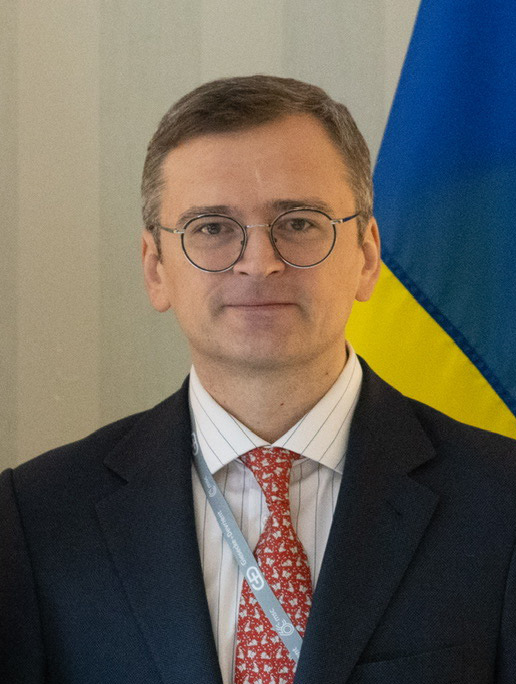
- Kuleba in 2024

Minister of Foreign Affairs
- In office 4 March 2020 – 5 September 2024
- President: Volodymyr Zelenskyy
- Prime Minister: Denys Shmyhal
- Preceded by: Vadym Prystaiko
- Succeeded by: Andrii Sybiha

Deputy Prime Minister on matters of European and Euro-Atlantic Integration
- In office 29 August 2019 – 4 March 2020
- President: Volodymyr Zelenskyy
- Prime Minister: Oleksiy Honcharuk
- Preceded by: Ivanna Klympush-Tsintsadze
- Succeeded by: Vadym Prystaiko

Permanent Representative of Ukraine to the Council of Europe
- In office 9 April 2016 – 29 August 2019
- Preceded by: Mykola Tochytsky
- Succeeded by: Borys Tarasyuk

Personal details
- Born: 19 April 1981 (age 45) Sumy, Ukrainian SSR, Soviet Union
- Party: Servant of the People
- Children: 2
- Education: Taras Shevchenko National University of Kyiv (PhD, International Law)
- Occupation: Politician; diplomat

Dmytro Ivanovych Kuleba (Ukrainian: Дмитро Іванович Кулеба [dmɪˈtrɔ iˈwɑnɔwɪtʃ kʊˈlɛbɐ]; born 19 April 1981) is a Ukrainian politician and diplomat who served as Minister of Foreign Affairs. He was concurrently a member of the National Defense and Security Council of Ukraine.

The youngest foreign affairs minister in Ukraine's history (after Arseniy Yatsenyuk), he previously worked as Deputy Prime Minister of Ukraine for European and Euro-Atlantic Integration and Permanent Representative of Ukraine to the Council of Europe between 2016 and 2019.

On 4 September 2024, he resigned as Minister of Foreign Affairs amidst a cabinet shuffle.

== Early life ==
Kuleba was born on 19 April 1981 in Sumy, in the then Ukrainian Soviet Socialist Republic of the Soviet Union. In 2003, he graduated with honors with a degree in International Law from the Institute of International Relations of the Taras Shevchenko National University of Kyiv. Kuleba subsequently obtained a Candidate of Sciences degree (the degree of Candidate of Sciences was replaced with the degree of Doctor of Philosophy (PhD)) in Law in 2006.

== Foreign officer (2003–2019) ==
Kuleba has served in Ukraine's diplomatic service and the Ministry of Foreign Affairs since 2003. He abandoned public service in 2013, citing his disagreement with Ukraine president Viktor Yanukovych's course, and chaired the UART Foundation for Cultural Diplomacy. He took an active part in the Euromaidan protests in 2013–2014.

At the height of the early stages of the Russian invasion of Ukraine in 2014, Kuleba decided to return to the Ministry of Foreign Affairs as Ambassador-at-Large to launch strategic communications. He introduced the concepts of digital diplomacy, strategic communications, cultural diplomacy and public diplomacy into the Ministry's work.

In 2016, Kuleba was appointed Permanent Representative of Ukraine to the Council of Europe.

== Political office (2019–2024) ==
From August 2019 to March 2020, he was Deputy Prime Minister on matters of European relations. He also served as Minister of Foreign Affairs from 4 March 2020 to 4 September 2024. In an interview on 27 April 2020 he outlined what he saw as the challenges of his new position.

Leading up to the full-scale Russian invasion of Ukraine on February 22, 2022, Kuleba was convinced that war was imminent, but underestimated the scale until days before the attack. Shortly before the invasion, American government officials showed him intelligence that Russia was preparing paratroopers to storm airports in Ukraine, which convinced him that a major conflict was coming.

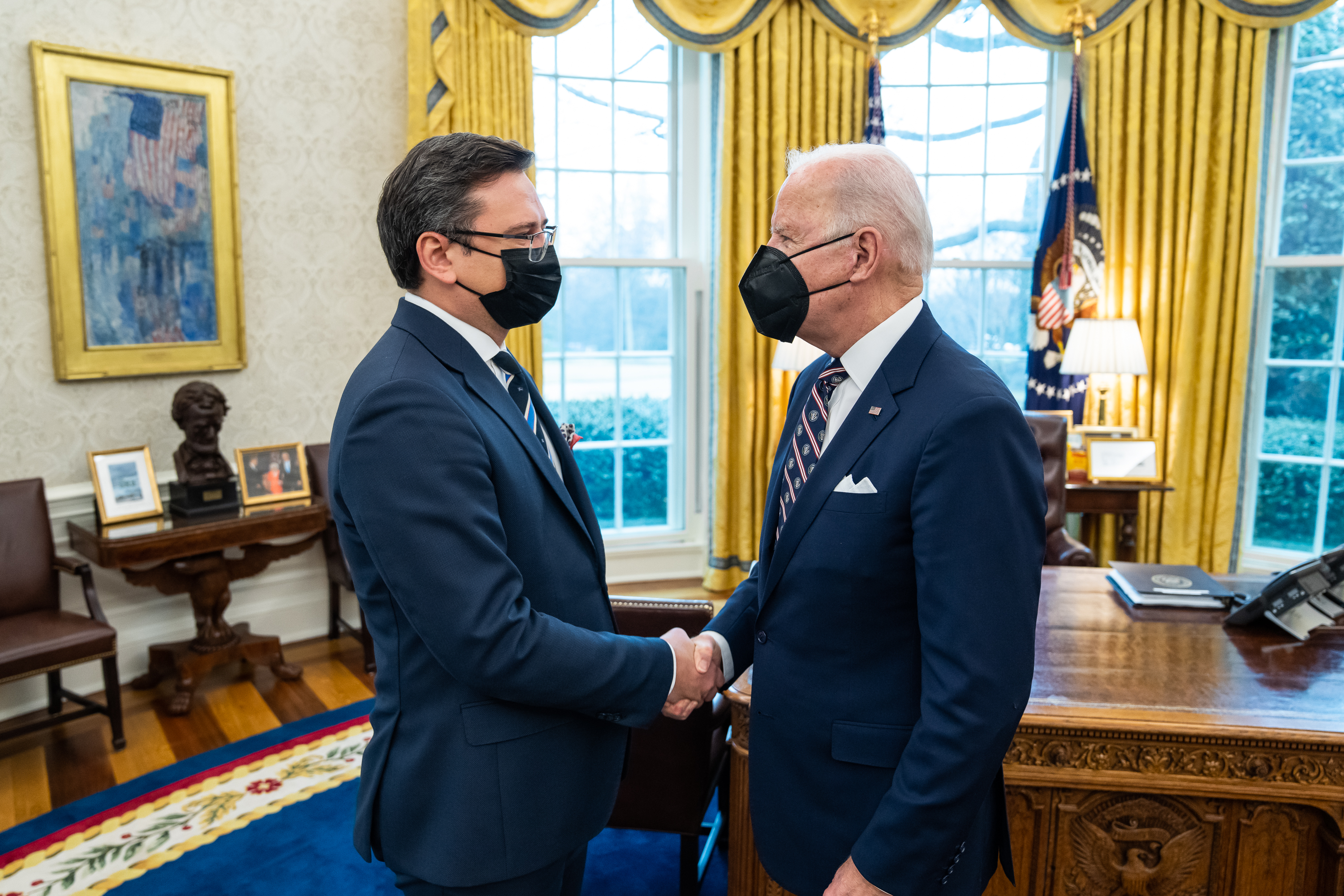
Kuleba greeting U.S. President Joe Biden, 22 February 2022

In a lengthy interview on 24 March 2022 Kuleba called Russian president Vladimir Putin a "war criminal". According to him, the Russians had already used white phosphorus munitions and cluster bombs. On 10 May 2022, Kuleba said that "In the first months" of the Russian invasion "the victory for us looked like withdrawal of Russian forces to the positions they occupied before February 24 and payment for inflicted damage. Now if we are strong enough on the military front and we win the battle for Donbas, which will be crucial for the following dynamics of the war, of course the victory for us in this war will be the liberation of the rest of our territories", including Donbas and Crimea.

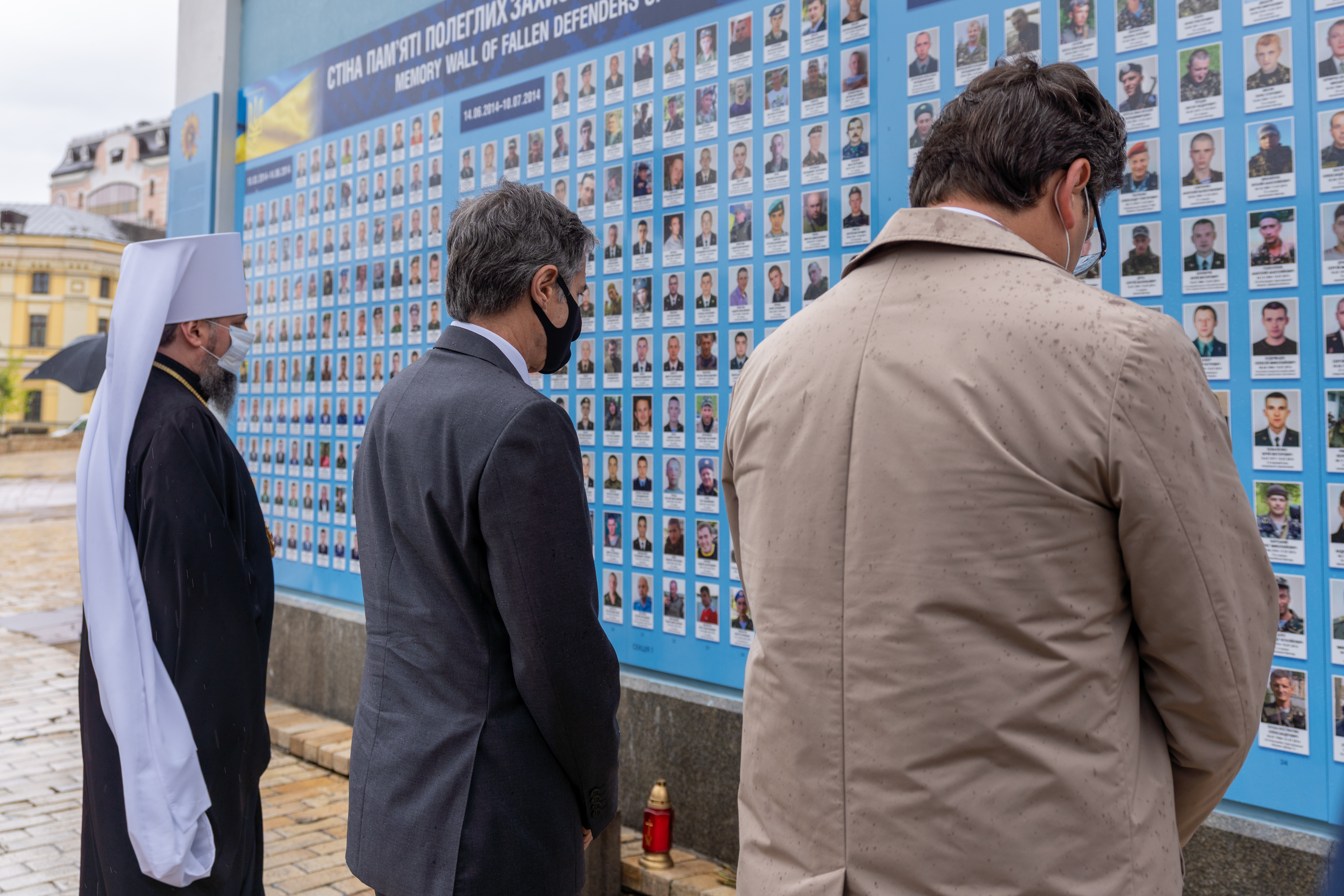
Kuleba, Metropolitan Epiphanius and U.S. Secretary of State Antony Blinken at The Wall of Remembrance of the Fallen for Ukraine near Mykhailivska Square in Kyiv on 6 May 2021

After Putin announced a partial mobilization of Russia's armed forces and referenced a potential use of nuclear weapons, Kuleba said that "Putin has shown utter disrespect to China, India, Mexico, Turkey, other Asian, African, Middle Eastern, Latin American nations which have called for diplomacy and an end to Russia's war on Ukraine." On 10 October 2022, he urged African states to abandon their neutrality and condemn Russia's invasion of Ukraine. He called Putin a "terrorist" whose "only tactic is terror on peaceful Ukrainian cities." He appeared on the American talk show The Late Show with Stephen Colbert on 22 September 2022. On 28 October 2022, he demanded the immediate cessation of the supply of Iranian weapons to Russia, including Iranian kamikaze drones. On 12 November 2022, he urged ASEAN countries to abandon their neutrality and support Ukraine.

In a December 2022 interview with the Associated Press, Kuleba called for a February 2023 peace summit at the United Nations mediated by secretary-general António Guterres, only inviting Russia if it faces an international court for war crimes. In another December interview, he predicted that:

After this war we will be full members of both the EU and NATO, and guarantors of global food security. We will be an integral and indispensable part of the West. The West is not a geographical notion; it's a political one. And if you share the same principles and values, irrespective of your geography, you belong to the West.

In December 2022 Kuleba criticized India for buying cheap Russian oil. On 29 December 2022, following the strikes against Ukrainian infrastructure, Kuleba tweeted, "There can be no 'neutrality' in the face of such mass war crimes. Pretending to be 'neutral' equals taking Russia's side."

As the one-year anniversary of the invasion drew near, Kuleba went to the US and spoke to Harvard University students, while he quarterbacked a number of diplomatic initiatives at the United Nations in New York, for example passing Resolution ES-11/7 of the Eleventh emergency special session of the United Nations General Assembly on 23 February and one day later the 9269th meeting of the United Nations Security Council addressed the "Maintenance of peace and security of Ukraine", during which a roll call of friends and allies spoke in favour of Ukraine for over three hours.

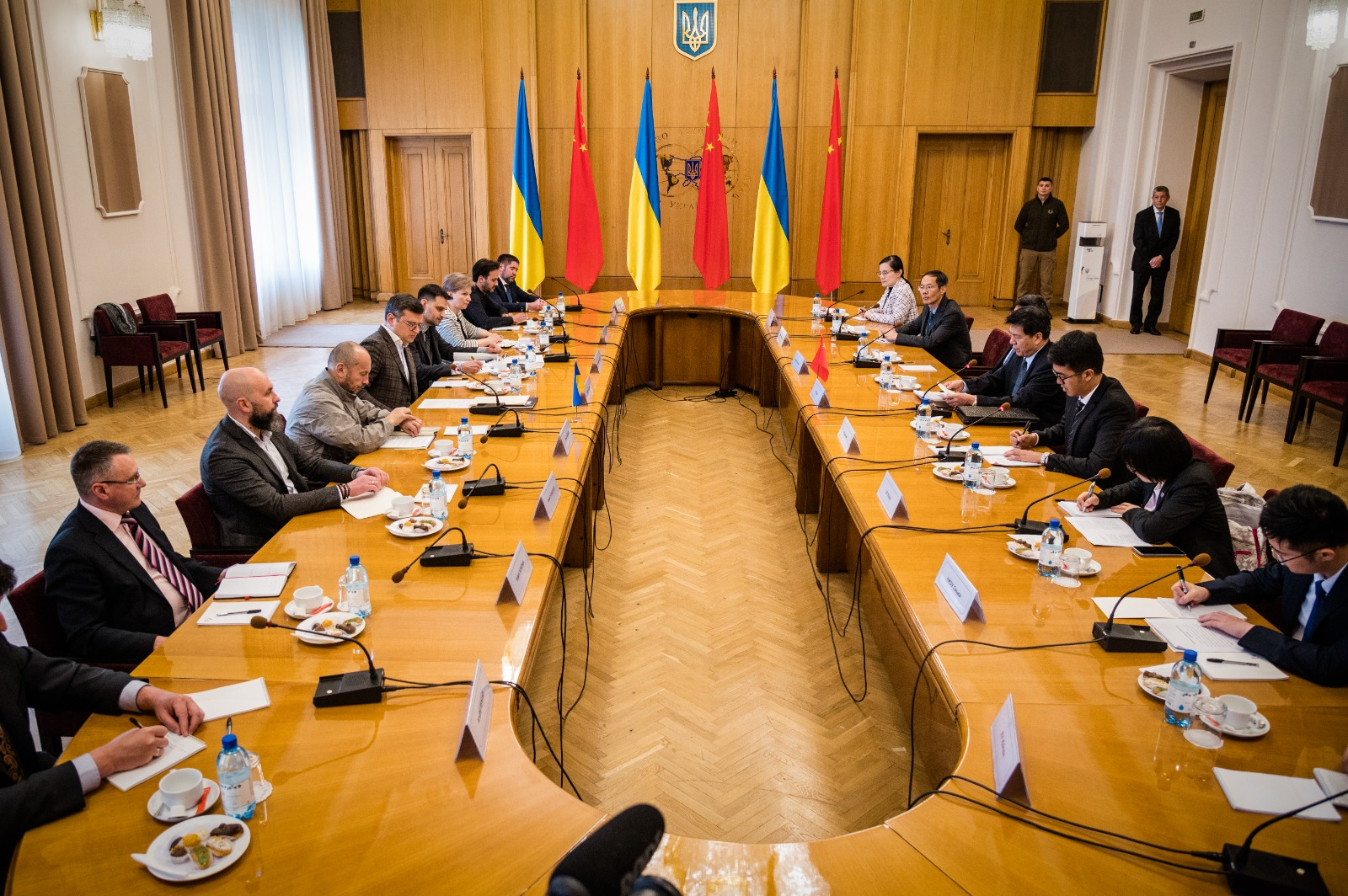
Chinese peace envoy Li Hui meets with Kuleba in Kyiv on 17 May 2023

In March 2023, Kuleba said that China "will not allow Russia to collapse" but "they need a weak Russia to make concessions to China, to provide their resources."

On 16 May 2023, South African President Cyril Ramaphosa announced that the leaders of African countries came up with a new initiative for peace in Ukraine. Both Russia and Ukraine welcomed the African leaders' mission, but Kuleba warned that "Any peace initiative should respect the territorial integrity of Ukraine, it should not imply, even in-between the lines, any cessation of Ukrainian territory to Russia. Second, any peace plan should not lead to the freezing of the conflict."

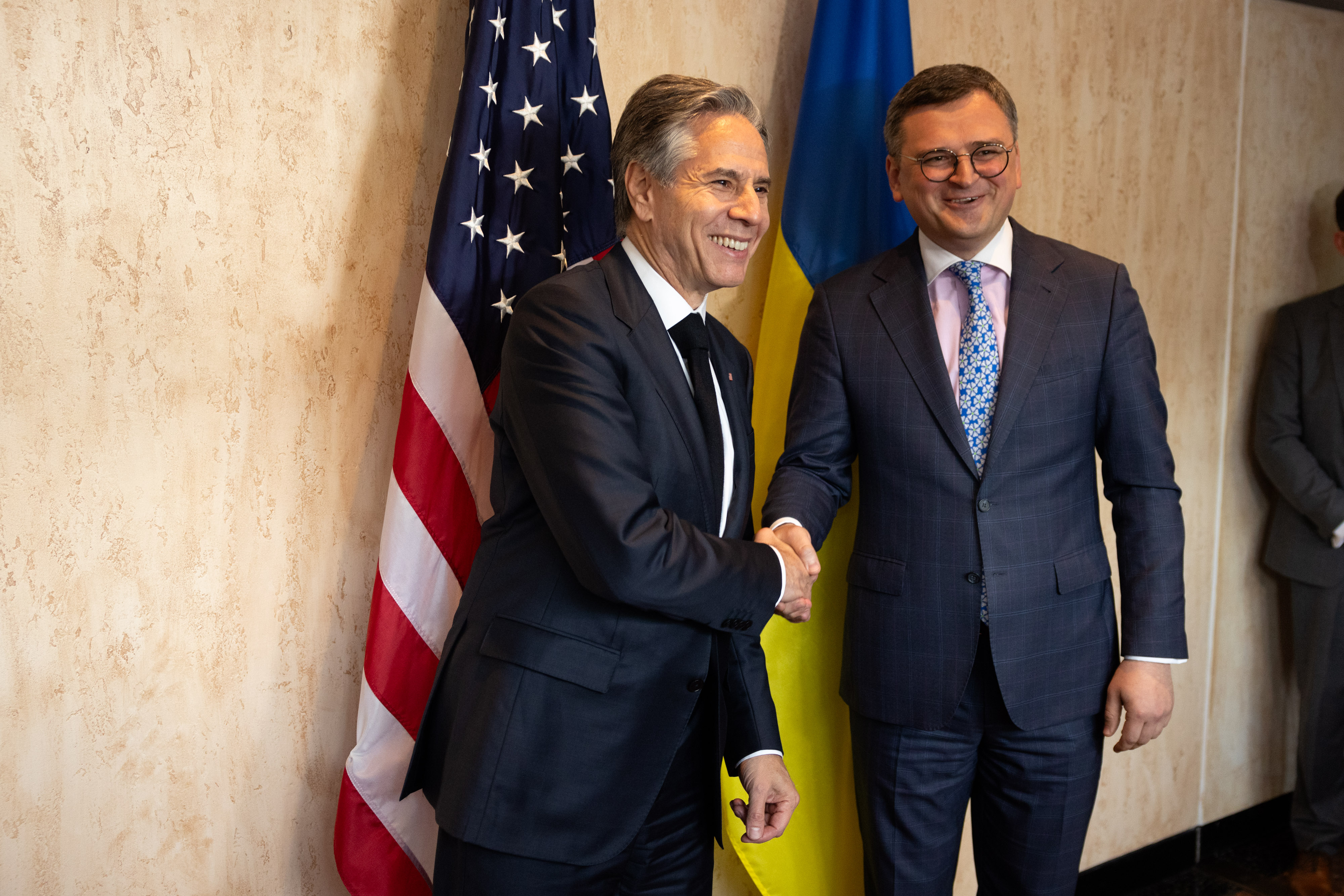
Kuleba meeting with U.S. Secretary of State Antony Blinken in London, on 20 June 2023

In July 2023 when Ukrainian four-time individual world sabre champion Olga Kharlan was disqualified at the World Fencing Championships for not shaking the hand of her defeated Russian opponent, though she instead offered a tapping of blades in acknowledgement, Kuleba voiced support for Kharlan. He wrote on social media: "I urge [Fédération Internationale d'Escrime] to restore Kharlan's rights and allow her to compete."

Kuleba told an audience at the World Economic Forum in January 2024:

We see that the actual Dynamics in engaging countries from all over the world into the Ukrainian plan is very positive and I think we are setting a precedent here where the terms of peace are being defined by a country whose peace was broken by an Invader it's not the Invader who imposes his peace terms on the victim it's not the third party that is proposing a compromise solution in a form of Peace terms it's us the country that is fighting back that defines the rules of peace and I think it's quite a remarkable moment in human history and in the history of wars and diplomacy.

One of the 10 points in this plan is accountability and accountability implies the tribunal and paying for the damage inflicted and the most important part of this peace plan is of course restoring territorial Integrity of Ukraine so when we hear arguments coming from some experts or thinkers that maybe it's worth freezing the conflict our response is you know we need frozen assets not frozen conflict.

This is the way forward: to send a clear message to everyone in the world that if you dare to break rules you're going to pay. If we don't send that message if we don't make it very clear the number of conflicts--Interstate conflicts--and tensions across the globe will grow and I think this is and the price of fixing them will be much higher than the price of helping Ukraine. I think this is one of the motivations that brings all these countries at the table because they realize the consequences of not participating in an effort to restore peace on just terms.

== Post-political career ==
In December 2024, the Belfer Center for Science and International Affairs at Harvard Kennedy School has announced the appointment of Dmytro Kuleba as a non-resident senior fellow. The official release described Kuleba as "internationally recognized as one of the most influential diplomats of his generation and a global champion for democracy, freedom, and resilience." The following month, he became an associate professor at the Sciences Po, teaching wartime diplomacy. In August 2026, The Kyiv Independent reported that he was under consideration as a candidate for ambassador to the United States, after Olha Stefanishyna's departure amidst a corruption investigation.

Kuleba serves on the Executive Advisory Board of the World.Minds Foundation, where he engages in international dialogue on diplomacy, security, and global cooperation.

== Political views ==
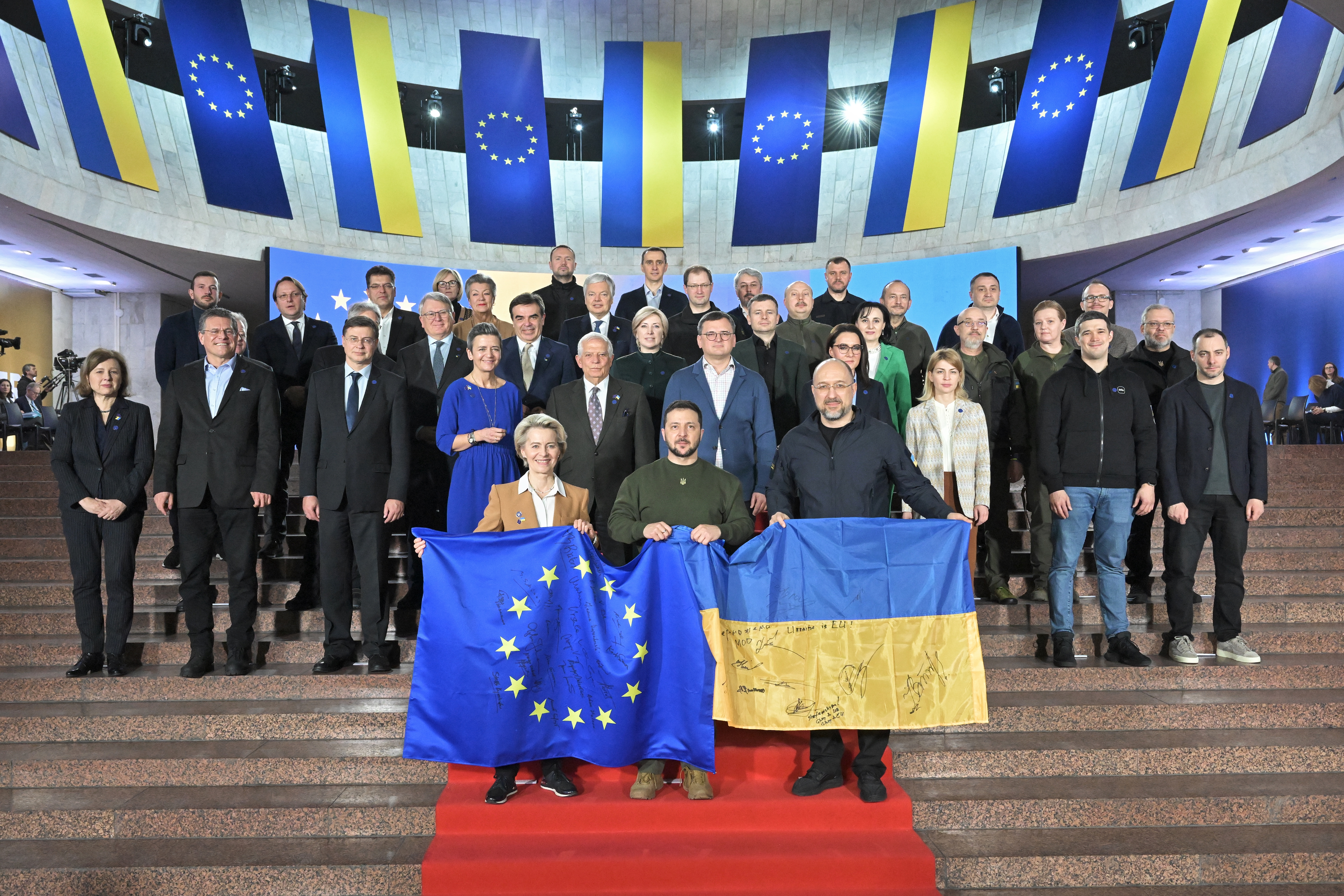
Kuleba with Ursula von der Leyen, Volodymyr Zelenskyy, and Denys Shmyhal during the EU-Ukraine summit in Kyiv on 2 February 2023

Dmytro Kuleba is a consistent supporter of Ukraine joining the European Union and NATO. He is in favor of providing Ukraine with an Action Program on NATO membership. In his opinion, Ukraine will join NATO before the EU.

Kuleba has repeatedly noted that Ukrainian identity is Central European, and he considers the deepening of relations and integration with neighboring countries in Central Europe to be one of the priorities of foreign policy.

In 2026, Kuleba predicted that the Russo-Ukrainian war would not end with a deal, but added that Ukraine had laid the "foundation of victory" by surviving. He projected that Ukraine could either stabilize like Poland following the Cold War, or suffer a fate similar to Lebanon.

== Personal life ==
In 2019, Kuleba wrote The War for Reality. How to Win in the World of Fakes, Truths and Communities a book on modern communications, media literacy, and countering disinformation. In December 2017, Kuleba was named the best Ukrainian ambassador of the Year 2017 by the Institute of World Policy.

Kuleba's mother is Yevhenia Kuleba. His father Ivan Kuleba is a career diplomat, a former Deputy Minister of Foreign Affairs of Ukraine (2003–2004), as well as Ukraine's ambassador to Egypt (1997–2000), Czech Republic (2004–2009), Kazakhstan (2008–2019), and Armenia (2019–2021).

His wife is Svitlana Paveletska, a co-founder of the publishing house #книголав and a strategic communications consultant. His former wife Yevhenia, with whom he has two children, was number 1 on the party list for the Kyiv City Council of the party Servant of the People in the 2020 Kyiv local election.

== Awards and honors ==
Ukraine:

- Order of Merit, 3rd class (2021)

Lithuania:

- Grand Commander of the Order for Merits to Lithuania (2022)

While a senior fellow at the Belfer Center, Kuleba was invited to give the 2025 Lamont Lecture hosted by the Harvard Institute of Politics, which highlights speakers who are "widely recognized for leadership in diminishing the risk of nuclear war."

== See also ==
- Honcharuk Government
- Shmyhal Government
- List of foreign ministers in 2020
- List of foreign ministers in 2021
- List of foreign ministers in 2022
- List of foreign ministers in 2023
- List of foreign ministers in 2024

Political offices
Preceded by Vadym Prystaiko	Minister of Foreign Affairs; 2020–2024	Succeeded by Andrii Sybiha
