= Vladimir Semichastny =

KGB Chairman (1961–1967)

- Владимир Семичастный
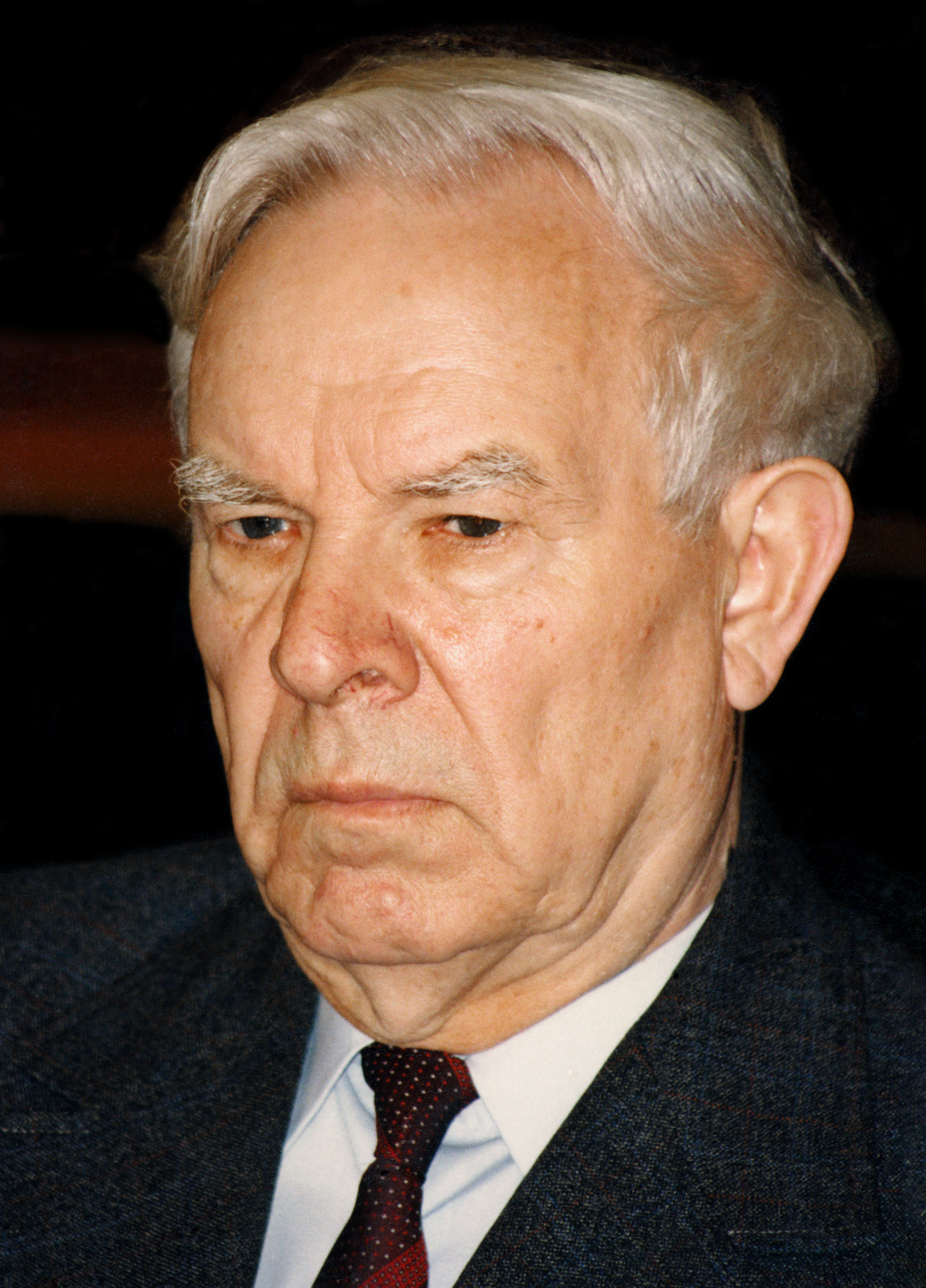
- Semichastny in May 1998

3rd Chairman of the Committee for State Security (KGB)
- In office November 13, 1961 – May 18, 1967
- Premier: Nikita Khrushchev; Alexei Kosygin
- Preceded by: Pyotr Ivashutin
- Succeeded by: Yuri Andropov

Personal details
- Born: Vladimir Yefimovich Semichastny; 15 January 1924 village Hryhorivka, Yekaterinoslav Governorate, Ukrainian SSR, Soviet Union
- Died: 12 January 2001 (aged 76) Moscow, Russia
- Citizenship: Soviet (until 1991) and Russian
- Party: Communist Party of the Soviet Union (1941–1991)
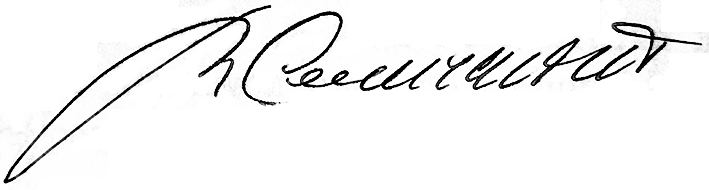
- Signature

Military service
- Allegiance: USSR
- Branch/service: KGB
- Years of service: 1961–1967
- Rank: Colonel general

Vladimir Yefimovich Semichastny (Russian: Влади́мир Ефи́мович Семича́стный; Ukrainian: Володимир Юхимович Семичастний; 15 January 1924 – 12 January 2001) was a Soviet politician, who served as Chairman of the KGB from November 1961 to May 1967. A protégé of Alexander Shelepin, he rose through the ranks of the Communist Youth League (Komsomol).

== Early life ==
Semichastny was born in January 1924 in the village of Hryhorivka, near Grishino (today Pokrovsk), in the Yekaterinoslav Governorate (today Donetsk Oblast) of Soviet Ukraine, to a working-class Russian family originally from Tula Province. After finishing high school in 1941, he began studying Chemistry at the Institute of Chemical Technology in Kemerovo, but his studies were interrupted by World War II; his family back in Ukraine were evacuated to Astrakhan, due to the Nazi conquest of the region, and Semichastny himself was drafted to the Red Army. After the liberation of the Donbas by the Red Army in 1943, Semichastny returned home. Later, he received a degree in history from Kiev State University.

== In the Communist Youth League ==
After the end of the war, Semichastny became a full-time employee of the Communist Youth League (Komsomol), working in the fields of propaganda and administration. From 1947 to 1950 he was First Secretary of the Ukrainian Komsomol. In 1950 he was brought to Moscow to work in the central apparatus of the Komsomol, where he met and befriended Alexander Shelepin, forging very close ties with him and eventually succeeding him as First Secretary of the All-Union Komsomol, on 28 March 1958. On 29 October 1958, speaking to an audience of thousands at a rally to celebrate the 40th anniversary of the founding of Komsomol, he attacked Boris Pasternak, who had just been awarded the Nobel Prize for his novel, Doctor Zhivago, which had been published abroad after being suppressed in the USSR. Comparing him with "a pig that shits in its own sty", he called for Pasternak to be deported. It was this threat that made Pasternak decide to renounce the prize.

== In Azerbaijan ==
In 1959, Semichastny was sent by the Soviet leadership to the politically sensitive and oil-rich Soviet Socialist Republic of Azerbaijan, as Second Secretary of the ruling Communist Party of Azerbaijan, a position he held for two years, until 1961, serving under the Republic's leader Vali Akhundov.

== Chairman of the KGB ==
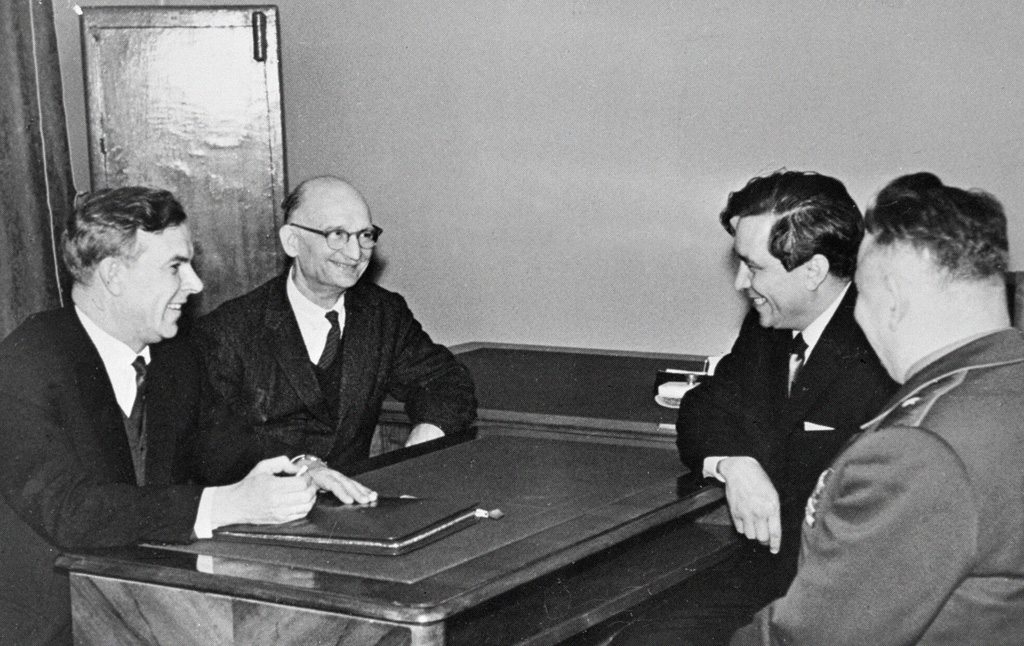
September 1964. Vladimir Semichastny, Chairman of the KGB (first from left), talking to Soviet intelligence officers Rudolf Abel (second from left) and Konon Molody (second from right) in 1964

Semichastny was appointed chairman of the KGB by Nikita Khrushchev in November 1961, again succeeding his friend and mentor Shelepin, who had been KGB Chairman since 1958. Appointed at the age of 37, he was the youngest Soviet security and intelligence chief of the Cold War. As KGB chief, he generally continued his predecessor's policies: support for national liberation movements worldwide, suppression of nationalism, separatism and the dissident movement within the Soviet Union, and recruitment of young university graduates to the KGB. He also put much emphasis on developing the security and intelligence services of the Soviet satellite states, and on assisting the communist forces in the Vietnam War.

Semichastny was surprised when Khrushchev informed him of his appointment as KGB Chairman, commenting that he did not have any experience in intelligence and counterintelligence; Khrushchev, however, told him that the KGB needed, above all, a deft political hand. Semichastny's young age and his lack of professional experience in intelligence and counterintelligence led him to rely heavily on senior department heads within the KGB; he was always respectful towards intelligence veterans, but he was also determined to be in charge and leave his mark on the agency.

Semichastny's first decision as KGB Chairman, on November 22, 1961, (after nine days in office) was to approve the creation of a "sabotage and terrorism" group (as the KGB itself called it) within the Sandinista National Liberation Front in Nicaragua; the Sandinistas would eventually manage to seize power in that country in 1979.

Despite Khrushchev's fondness and esteem, Semichastny never became part of the Soviet leader's inner circle. The two rarely had one-on-one meetings (although there were some instances where they would have breakfast together, or a walk in the Kremlin where Semichastny would brief him on important matters) and Khrushchev was adamant in his belief that the KGB was to be confined to intelligence, counterintelligence and state security, and was not expected to have any policy recommendations of its own ("executor, not formulator of policy"), especially in foreign affairs, where Semichastny usually deferred to Foreign Minister Andrei Gromyko.

However, the KGB and its chairman retained their relevance and importance; every morning, a large file containing intelligence reports and analyses, selected and reviewed by Semichastny, was placed on Khrushchev's personal desk by one of his secretaries, and Khrushchev always read them.

During the Cuban Missile Crisis, Semichastny was responsible for coordinating all information received from abroad. His chosen crisis team oversaw intelligence from the Foreign Ministry, the GRU (Military Intelligence) and, of course, the KGB. The team met every day in his office at KGB Headquarters in Lubyanka Square.

During his tenure Semichasnty attempted to create a new, more positive public image for the KGB, permitting an article to appear in the newspaper Izvestia that included an interview with an unnamed "senior KGB officer" (himself); he stated

many young Communist Party and Communist Youth League workers have joined the KGB, and none of the people who, during the time of Joseph Stalin's cult of personality, took part in the repressions against innocent Soviet people, is now in the Service.

More articles, books and films on the security organs appeared, and Soviet spies became heroes in print and cinema; Rudolf Abel, Gordon Lonsdale, Harold (Kim) Philby and Richard Sorge.

In October 1963, Semichastny sanctioned the arrest of Frederick Barghoorn of Yale University when he was visiting Moscow. Semichastny hoped that by charging Barghoorn as a spy he could induce the United States to release Igor Ivanov, arrested by the Federal Bureau of Investigation (FBI) that month for espionage. Barghoorn was a friend of US President John F. Kennedy, who forcefully stated that Barghoorn was not involved in any illegal activities at a press conference. The Soviets subsequently released Barghoorn. Ivanov was eventually allowed to leave the United States in 1971.

Subsequently, Semichastny and his mentor Shelepin participated in the successful coup against Khrushchev in October 1964, an act that undoubtedly led to his being initially retained as KGB chief by the new, more hard-line Soviet leadership. There are some indications that Leonid Brezhnev, who led the coup against Khrushchev, wanted to assassinate him, but Semichastny, while participating in the ouster of Khrushchev, categorically refused to allow any bloodshed.

Semichastny was the one who informed Khrushchev of his removal from power, "by order of the Politburo"; as Khrushchev was returning to Moscow from a holiday at the Black Sea, Semichastny waited for him at the airport flanked by KGB security guards, informed him of his ouster and told him not to resist. Khrushchev did not resist, and the hardliners' coup went off smoothly; Khrushchev felt betrayed by Semichastny, as he considered him a friend and ally until that very moment, not suspecting that he had joined his enemies within the Party.

In March 1967, Stalin's daughter, Svetlana Alliluyeva, defected to the USA; Semichastny ordered the KGB to kidnap her and bring her back. The attempt failed, and led to the exposure of several KGB agents, who were arrested. This gave Shelepin's enemies a pretext to sack Semichastny. Shelepin was able to protect him for a few weeks, but in May, he was hospitalised for eight days after an operation, and in his absence, on 18 May 1967, the Politburo held a ten-minute discussion in which they decided to appoint Yuri Andropov, who was ten years older than Semichastny, as his replacement. Shelepin was removed from positions of influence soon afterwards.

== Later career ==
From 1967 until 1981 Semichastny was a Deputy Prime Minister of the Ukrainian Soviet Socialist Republic, although he did not have any significant influence in the political affairs of the Republic, which was tightly controlled by Brezhnevists. In 1981 he was removed from that position as well, and retired to private life.

Semichastny died in Moscow at the age of 76, on January 12, 2001, after suffering a stroke.

== Kennedy assassination ==
After U.S. President John F. Kennedy was assassinated in 1963, Semichastny investigated the background of Lee Harvey Oswald, who was arrested for the murder and was himself shot dead. Oswald had spent some time in the Soviet Union but, according to Semichastny's investigations, had never worked for any Soviet intelligence agency; Semichastny's verdict, that there was definitely "something fishy" in the whole affair, is shared by many.

According to Semichastny, during his service with the KGB he got reports on Oswald, who they were monitoring, "from time to time". In 1961 Oswald wrote a letter to the U.S. Embassy in Russia, indicating his interest in returning to the United States. Semichastny says that his reaction was "Thank God! Immediately we sent a note to the Ministry of Internal Affairs saying let him out".

== Assessment ==
Markus Wolf, the intelligence chief of East Germany, who worked closely with Semichastny, described him as follows:

"He was as kind and friendly as might be expected from a former leader of the Komsomol, the party's youth wing. Though affable, Semichastny was a sharp-minded, ideologically severe man. Semichastny's personal obsession was the pollution of the system from within by Soviet artists and writers; it was he who masterminded the vilification of Boris Pasternak and his novel Dr. Zhivago. He had little interest in foreign intelligence, which he left to Aleksandr Sakharovsky, who was highly respected by many members of his staff, as well as by me".

Party political offices
Preceded by Vasiliy Kostyenko	First Secretary of the LKSMU; 1947–1950	Succeeded by Georgiy Shevel
Preceded by Aleksandr Shelepin	First Secretary of the Komsomol; 1958–1959	Succeeded by Sergei Pavlov
Government offices
Preceded by Alexander Shelepin	Chairman of the Committee for State Security; November 13, 1961 – May 18, 1967	Succeeded by Yuri Andropov
