= Komsomol of Ukraine =

Youth wing of the Communist Party of Ukraine

Leninist Communist League of Youth of Ukraine
- Ле́нінська Комуністи́чна Спі́лка Мо́лоді Украї́ни (ЛКСМУ)
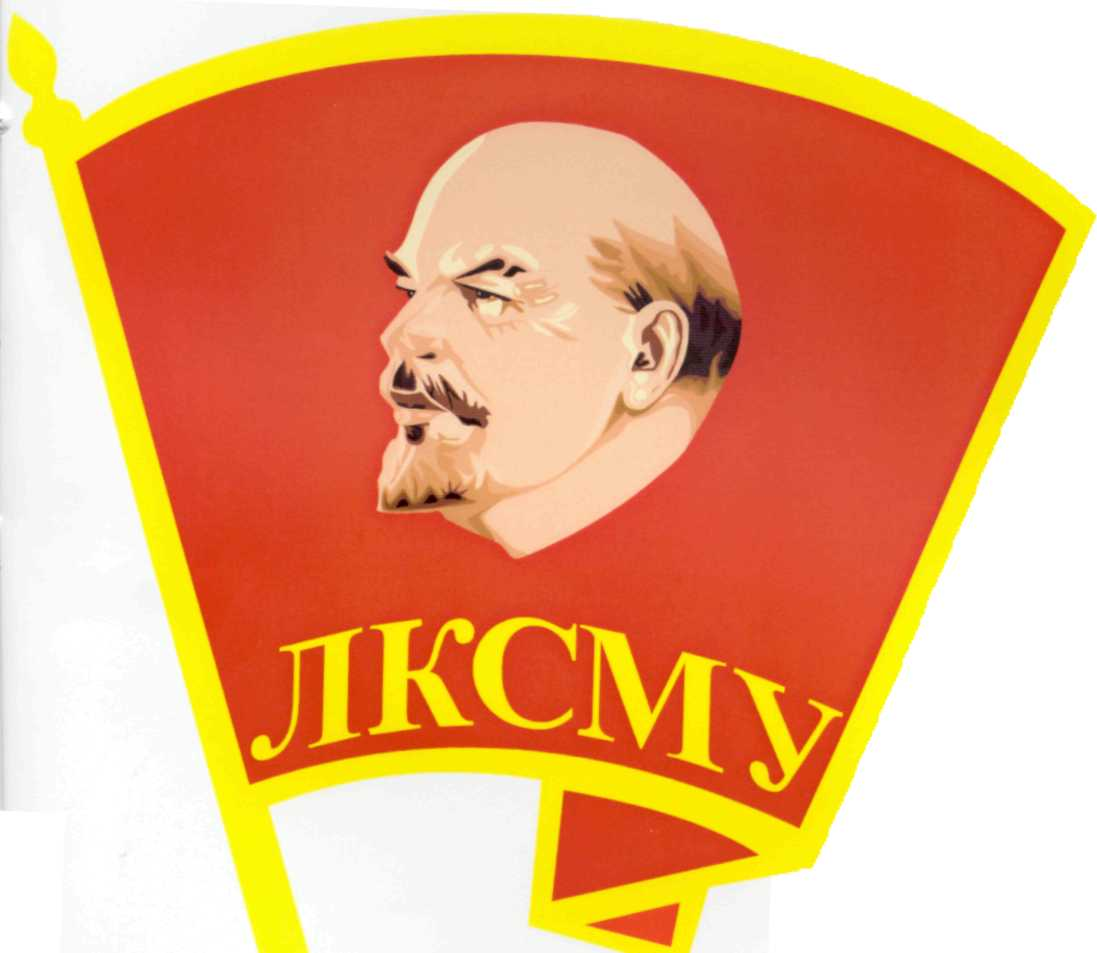
- Logo

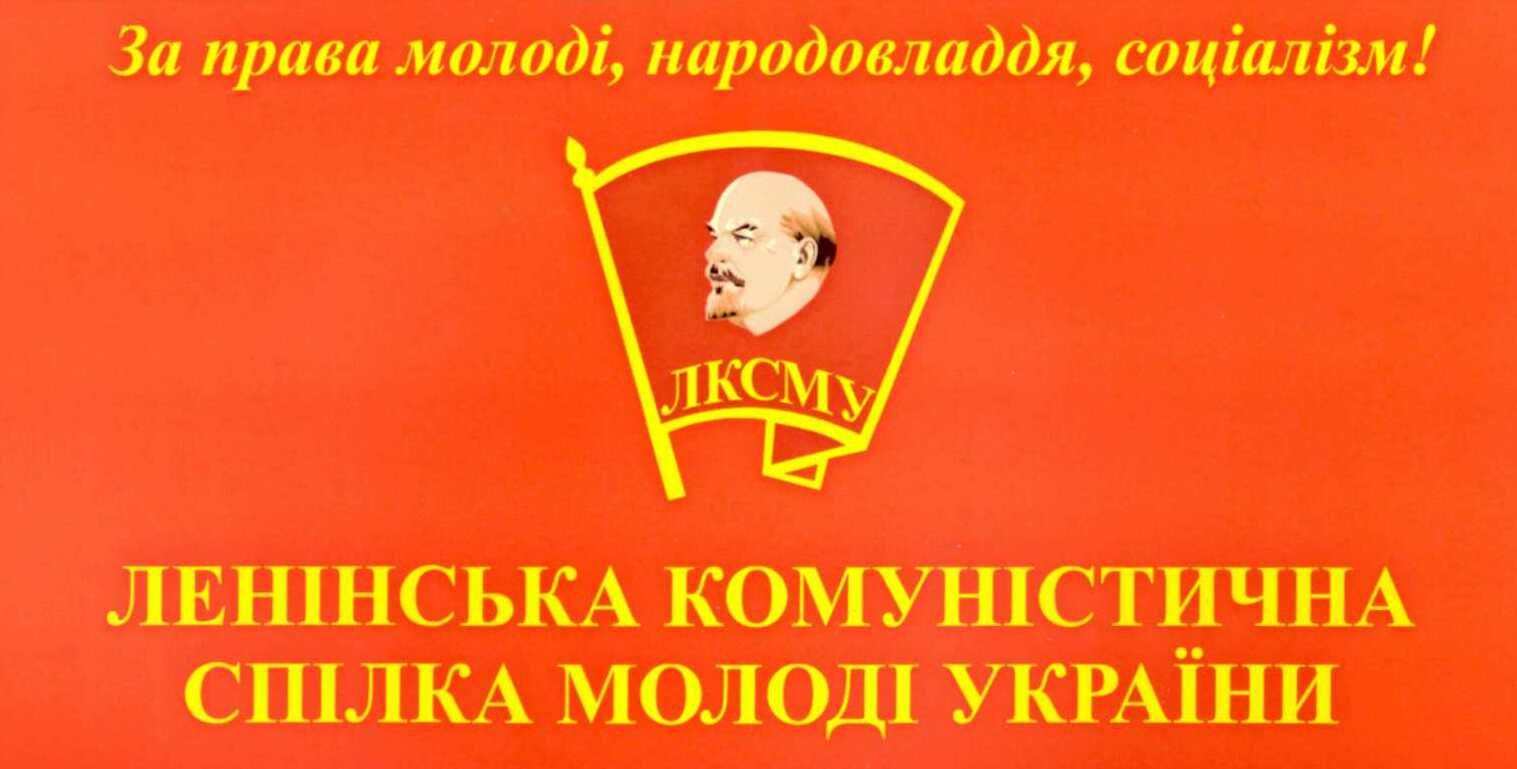
- Flag
- Abbreviation: LCSYU
- Formation: 26 June 1919
- Dissolved: 30 August 1991 (first ban); 6 July 2022 (second ban)
- Type: youth organization
- Official language: Russian, Ukrainian
- Leader: Mykhailo Kononovych
- Main organ: Molod Ukrayiny (1919-1991)
- Parent organization: Communist Party of Ukraine and Komsomol Central Committee

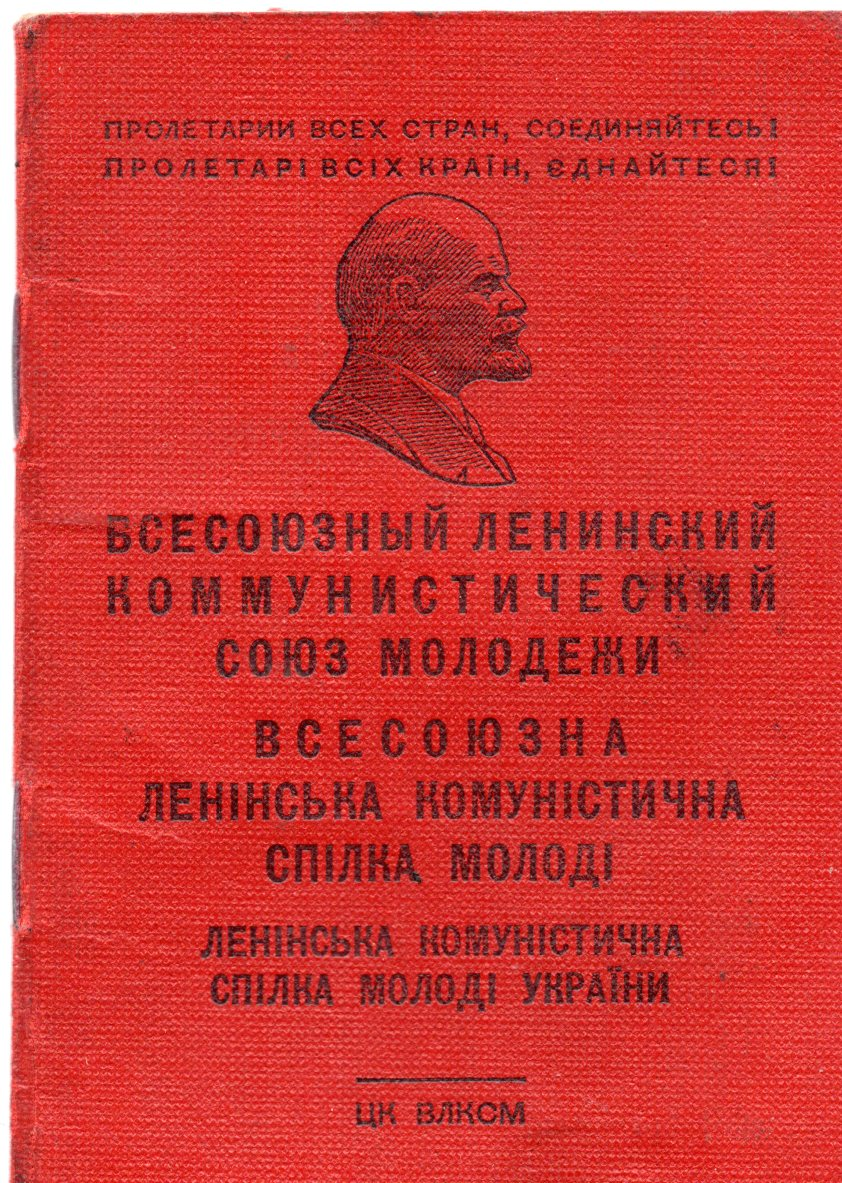
Organization's document

The Komsomol of Ukraine, officially the Leninist Communist League of Youth of Ukraine (ЛКСМУ, Ukrainian: Ленінська Комуністична Спілка Молоді України, romanized: Leninska Komunistychna Spilka Molodi Ukrainy; Russian: Ленинский Коммунистический Союз Молодёжи Украины, romanized: Leninskiy Kommunisticheskiy Soyuz Molodyozhi Ukrainy), was a youth organization in the Ukrainian Soviet Socialist Republic under the Communist Party of Ukraine, a component part of the All-Union Lenin's Communist League of Youth (Komsomol). It was first established in 1919 as the youth wing of the Communist Party (Bolsheviks) of Ukraine and later revived in 1997 as the youth wing of the modern Communist Party of Ukraine; that party was banned in 2015 and terminated in 2022.

Between the two World Wars, the Komsomol of Ukraine closely cooperated with the Young Communist League of Western Ukraine, which was a component part of the Young Communist League of Poland.

== History ==
Predecessors of Komsomol in Ukraine were youth organizations created in Kyiv, Kharkiv, Poltava, Odesa, Mykolaiv, and some other cities after the February Revolution and under political agitation from Bolsheviks professed a Marxist ideology calling themselves "socialist leagues of working youth". Bolsheviks actively used these organizations first to carry out underground revolutionary activities and later to seize power and suppression of resistance, carry out armed actions, others. For such purpose at this organizations were created "battle retinues" (basic formations of Bolshevik Military Organizations), many members of which were directed to detachments of the Red Guards.

Soon after the Bolshevik revolution in Petrograd, also known as the "Great October Revolution", in order to increase ideological and organizational influence on the leagues and youth in general in all cities of the former Imperial Russia, Bolshevik started the process of establishing a united centralized communist league of youth. The creation of such youth organization was started by the Central Committee of the Russian Communist Party (Bolsheviks). At first there was created the Russian Communist League of Youth (RKSM, see Komsomol). In October 1918 at the First Congress of RKSM were adopted the program and statute of the league where it was proclaimed its basic tasks to spread ideology of communism, revolutionary upbringing of youth, active participation in development of the Soviet State. The organizational principle in development of Komsomol was a "democratic centralism" that as in the Bolshevik party ensured full control over members of organization on the part of its leaders. Locally the activities of Komsomol cells were directed and controlled by local Communist Party cells. At the First Congress of RKSM, there was present only one delegate from Ukraine. This did not prevent the congress from declaring that "the moment is near when revolutionary Ukrainian youth will join the united family of working youth of Russia".

During the second phase of the Soviet-Ukrainian War in 1919, the leaders of the newly formed Communist Party (Bolsheviks) of Ukraine led the process of creating all-Ukrainian communist league of youth, the Communist League of Working Youth of Ukraine (KSRMU). At the First Congress of KSRMU (June–July, 1919) it was declared that the league shares the program and tactics of the Communist Party (Bolsheviks) of Ukraine, operates under its leadership. It was claimed: a) Communist League of Working Youth of Ukraine is a part of RKSM; b) the Central Committee of KSRMU operates as a regional branch of RKSM. According with the KSRMU statute, the organization was accepting only "workers' youth" (that limitation was implemented because as it was explained in the document no to "dilute" the league with persons who do not have the "proletarian class training"). Along with that since the RCP(b) leadership had a goal to create a mass participated communist league of youth, soon the entry to RKSM and its branch KSRMU was permitted also of peasant origin as well as student youth. In August 1919 both CC RCP(b) and CC RKSM sent out a mutual directive that Komsomol recognizes the RCP(b) program and tactics and is an autonomous organization that operates "under control of the Center and local party cells". To the Komsomol may have been enrolled young people from age of 14, at the same time it was mandatory to join for all RCP(b) members under age of 20. The Second Congress of RKSM (October 1919) declared that all "communist activities among youth are carried out by the RKSM. There should not be any other special national communist leagues of youth".

The Komsomol in Ukraine was established on June 26, 1919, as the Communist League of Working Youth of Ukraine. In the Soviet Union such organization existed in 1919–1991. It was dissolved after the Communist Party of Ukraine was prohibited in Ukraine. It was revived in 1997. The original publishing newspaper was Molod Ukrayiny (1925–1991).

In 2011, with the support from the Communist Party of Ukraine and the Ministry of Education and Science, Komsomol initiated a process on revival of the Pioneer Organization of Ukraine. The base of the organization will be a reformed ideology of Children Communist. Until its ban and termination between 2015 and 2022, the organization was a member of the Left Opposition, as is its mother party.

== Leaders of Komsomol ==
#	Years	1st Secretary	Years	2nd Secretary
1	1922–1922	Samuil Ignat	None	
2	1922–1923	Vasyl Vasyutin	None	
3	1923–1923	David Gurevich	None	
4	1923–1925	Dmitriy Pavlov	1924–1926	Vasiliy Zavialov
5	1925–1927	Semyon Vysochinenko	1926–1928	Alexander Kurganov
6	1927–1928	Alexander Milchakov	1926–1928	Alexander Kurganov
7	1928–1930	Ivan Korsunov	1929–1930	Alexander Boichenko
8	1930–1933	Alexander Boichenko	1930s	Alexander Gapeyev
9	1933–1937	Sergei Andryeyev	1934–1935	Iosif Krayevskiy
9	1933–1937	Sergei Andryeyev	1935–1937	Nikolay Klinkov
10	1937–1938	Stepan Usenko	1937–1938	Vasiliy Ognenny
11	1938–1943	Yakov Khomenko	1938–1939	Filip Nasedkin
11	1938–1943	Yakov Khomenko	1939–1941	Vsevolod Butsol
12	1943–1947	Vasiliy Kostenko	1941–1946	Nikolay Kuznetsov
12	1943–1947	Vasiliy Kostenko	1946–1947	Pyotr Tronko
13	1947–1950	Vladimir Semichastny	1947–1948	Mikhail Mitrokhin
13	1947–1950	Vladimir Semichastny	1948–1950	Georgiy Shevel
14	1950–1955	Georgiy Shevel	1950–1952	Ivan Chirva
14	1950–1955	Georgiy Shevel	1952–1954	Boris Shulzhenko
14	1950–1955	Georgiy Shevel	1954–1955	Vasiliy Drozdenko
15	1955–1960	Vasiliy Drozdenko	1955–1960	Nikolay Kirichenko
15	1955–1960	Vasiliy Drozdenko	1960	Yuriy Yelchenko
16	1960–1968	Yuriy Yelchenko	1960–1965	Vladimir Kulik
16	1960–1968	Yuriy Yelchenko	1966–1968	Alexander Kapto
17	1968–1972	Alexander Kapto	1968–1970	Ivan Skiba
17	1968–1972	Alexander Kapto	1970–1972	Andrei Girenko
18	1972–1975	Andrei Girenko	1972–1975	Anatoliy Korniyenko
19	1975–1983	Anatoliy Korniyenko	1975–1979	Nikolay Beloblotskiy
19	1975–1983	Anatoliy Korniyenko	1979–1982	Boris Soldatenko
19	1975–1983	Anatoliy Korniyenko	1982–1983	Viktor Mironenko
20	1983–1986	Viktor Mironenko	1983–1986	Valeriy Tsybukh
21	1986–1989	Valeriy Tsybukh	1986–1990	Vladimir Miroshnichenko
22	1989–1991	Anatoliy Matviyenko	1990–1991	Vladimir Butko

#	Years	Name	Notes
1	1997–????	?	
2	2014–present	Mykhailo Kononovych	

== See also ==
- Komsomol
- Central Committee of the Communist Party of Ukraine (Soviet Union)
