= Valeriy Tsybukh =

Ukrainian politician (born 1951)

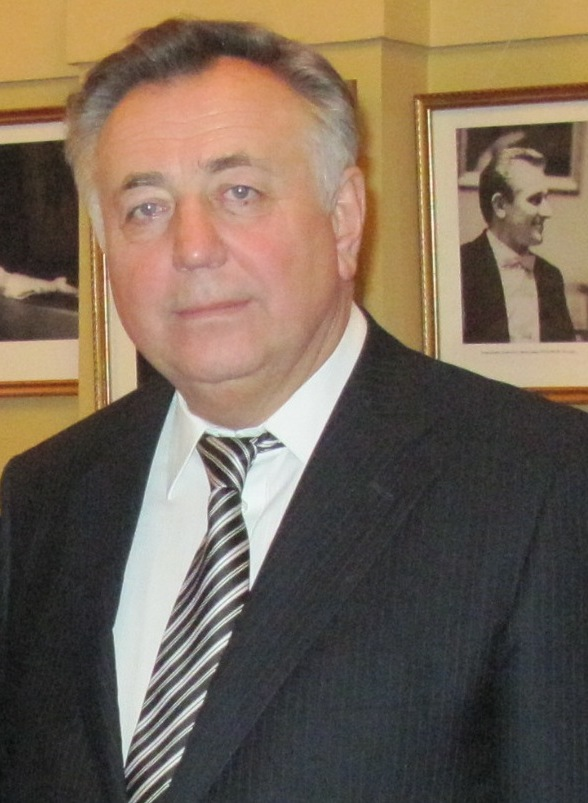

Valeriy Tsybukh (born March 9, 1951, Storozhynets, Chernivtsi Oblast, Ukraine) is a Ukrainian politician and diplomat. From 1998 to 2005 he headed state agency that is in charge of tourism in Ukraine.

Preceded by Viktor Mironenko (Viktor Myronenko)	1st Secretary of the Komsomol of Ukraine; 1986–1989	Succeeded by Anatoliy Matvienko (Anatoliy Matviyenko)
Preceded by Anatoliy Kasyanenko	Head of State Committee in Tourism; 1998–2000	Succeeded by Anatoliy Matviyenko
Preceded by Anatoliy Matviyenko	Head of State Tourism Administration; 2002–2005	Succeeded by Ihor Prystavsky
Preceded by Viktor Kalnyk	Ambassador of Ukraine in Greece (simultaneously in Albania); 2005–2010	Succeeded by Volodymyr Shkurov
