= Ministry of Foreign Affairs of Ukraine =

Government ministry of Ukraine

Ministry of Foreign Affairs
- Міністерство закордонних справ

Ministry overview
- Formed: November 12, 1917; 108 years ago
- Jurisdiction: Government of Ukraine
- Headquarters: 1, Mykhailivska Sq, Kyiv
- Employees: 2,000+
- Minister responsible: Andrii Sybiha, Minister of Foreign Affairs
- Website: mfa.gov.ua

The Ministry of Foreign Affairs of Ukraine (Ukrainian: Міністерство закордонних справ України, romanized: Ministerstvo zakordonnykh sprav Ukrainy, IPA: [min⁽ʲ⁾iˈstɛrstwo zɐkorˈdɔnːɪx ˈsprɑu̯ ʊkrɐˈjinɪ]) is the ministry of the Ukrainian government that oversees the foreign relations of Ukraine. The head of the ministry is the minister of foreign affairs.

== History ==
Originally, the ministry was established as the General Secretariat of Nationalities as part of the General Secretariat of Ukraine and was headed by the federalist Serhiy Yefremov. Due to the Soviet intervention, the office was reformed into a ministry on December 22, 1917. About the same time, another government was formed (the Soviet) that proclaimed the Ukrainian government to be counter-revolutionary. The Ukrainian Soviet government also reorganized its office on March 1, 1918. In 1923, the office was liquidated by the government of the Soviet Union and reinstated in 1944, twenty years later. The first Soviet representatives were not of much note until the appointment of the Bulgarian native Christian Rakovsky in 1919. The office would remain in operation even after Ukraine's restoration of independence in 1991.

On March 28, 2022, during the Russo-Ukrainian war, the ministry in a collaboration with One Philosophy launched the "Ukraine Street" campaign, calling for citizens of initially 34 countries in 53 cities to sign petitions of renaming their streets next to Russian embassies. It is a part of an attempt to "isolate Russia and de-Putinize the world", and to express solidarity with Ukraine. Streets in 20 cities of 17 countries have been renamed by its authorities during the campaign as of December 2022.

== General overview ==
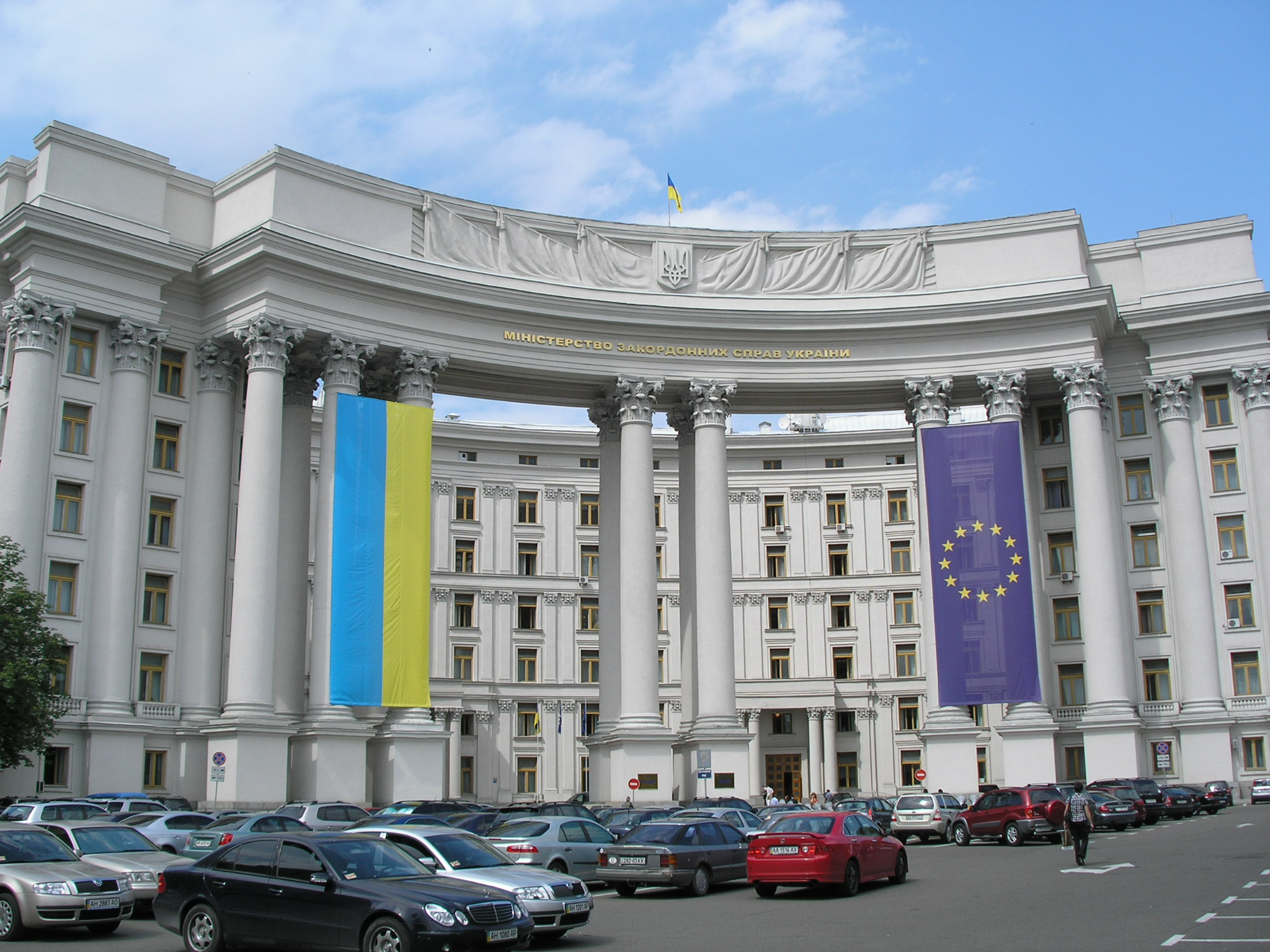
The ministry's main building in Kyiv

The ministry is located in Ukraine's capital Kyiv in the city's historic uppertown district, located in close proximity to the recently rebuilt St. Michael's Golden-Domed Monastery. The building of the ministry is also located on the Mykhailivska Square, named for the monastery and next to the park Volodymyrska Hill.

The nomination of the Foreign Minister is done by the President of Ukraine, unlike most nominations of Cabinet Minister which are done by the Prime Minister of Ukraine. All minister nominations have to be approved by the Ukrainian Parliament.

=== Office of National Commission of Ukraine for UNESCO ===
Ukraine has been a member of UNESCO since May 12, 1954. From December 1962 Ukraine had established its permanent representation in the organization currently served by the Ambassador of Ukraine to France. The National Commission of Ukraine for UNESCO was created as part of the Ministry of Foreign Affairs by the Presidential decree #212/1996 on March 26, 1996. The Chair of the National Commission of Ukraine for UNESCO is Sergiy Kyslytsya.

The permanent representative of Ukraine to UNESCO is the Ambassador to France Kostiantyn Tymoshenko.

Ukraine has 14 academic departments cooperating with UNESCO as well as 63 schools associated with the organization.

== List of ministers ==
=== Officials before 1924 ===
General Secretary of Nationalities (June 28 - December 22, 1917)

- Serhiy Yefremov (Socialist-Federalist) (June 28 - July 17, 1917)
- Oleksandr Shulhin (Socialist-Federalist) (July 17 - December 22, 1917)

People's Secretary of Nationalities (December 14, 1917 - March 1, 1918)

- Sergei Bakinsky (Bolshevik) (December 14, 1917 - March 1, 1918)

Ministry of Foreign Affairs (December 22, 1917 - May 1920)

- Oleksandr Shulhin (Socialist-Federalist) (December 22, 1917 - January 24, 1918)
- Vsevolod Holubovych (Socialist-Revolutionary) (January 24 - March 3, 1918)
- Mykola Liubynsky (Socialist-Revolutionary) (March 3 - April 28, 1918)
- Mykola Vasylenko (Association of Ukrainian Progressionists) (April 30 - May 20, 1918)
- Dmytro Doroshenko (Socialist-Federalist) (May 20 - November 14, 1918)
- Georgiy Afanasyev (November 14 - December 14, 1918)
- Volodymyr Chekhivsky (Ukrainian Menshevik) (December 26, 1918 - February 11, 1919)
- Kostiantyn Matsiyevych (February 13 - March 1919)
- Volodymyr Temnytsky (Social Democrat) (April - August 1919)
- Andriy Livytskyi (Ukrainian Menshevik) (August 1919 - May 1920)

People's Secretaries of Foreign Affairs (March 1, 1918 - July 1923)

- Volodymyr Zatonsky (Bolshevik) (March 1–4, 1918)
- Mykola Skrypnyk (Bolshevik) (March 8 - April 18, 1918)
- Christian Rakovsky (Bolshevik) (January - July 1919)
- Christian Rakovsky (Bolshevik) (March 1920 - July 1923)

State Secretaries of Foreign Affairs of Western Ukraine (November 1918 - February 1923)

- Vasyl Paneiko (National Democrat) (November 1918 - January 1919)
- Lonhyn Tsehelsky (National Democrat) (January - February 1919)
- Mykhailo Lozynsky (March - April 1919)
- Stepan Vytvytskyi (National Democrat) (April 1919 - February 1920)
- Kost Levytsky (National Democrat) (1920 - February 1923)

=== Officials after World War II ===
People's Commissars of Foreign Affairs

- Oleksandr Korniychuk (February - July 1944)
- Dmitry Manuilsky (July 1944 - March 15, 1946)

Ministers of Foreign Affairs

- Dmitry Manuilsky (March 15, 1946 - 1952)
- Anatoliy Baranovsky (June 10, 1952 - June 17, 1953)
  - Luka Palamarchuk (June 17, 1953 - May 11, 1954)
- Luka Palamarchuk (May 11, 1954 - August 13, 1965)
- Dmytro Bilokolos (March 16, 1966 - June 11, 1970)
- Georgiy Shevel (August 10, 1970 - November 18, 1980)
- Volodymyr Martynenko (November 18, 1980 - December 28, 1984)
- Volodymyr Kravets (December 28, 1984 - July 27, 1990)
- Anatoliy Zlenko (July 27, 1990 - August 24, 1991)

Ministers of Foreign Affairs (post-Soviet)

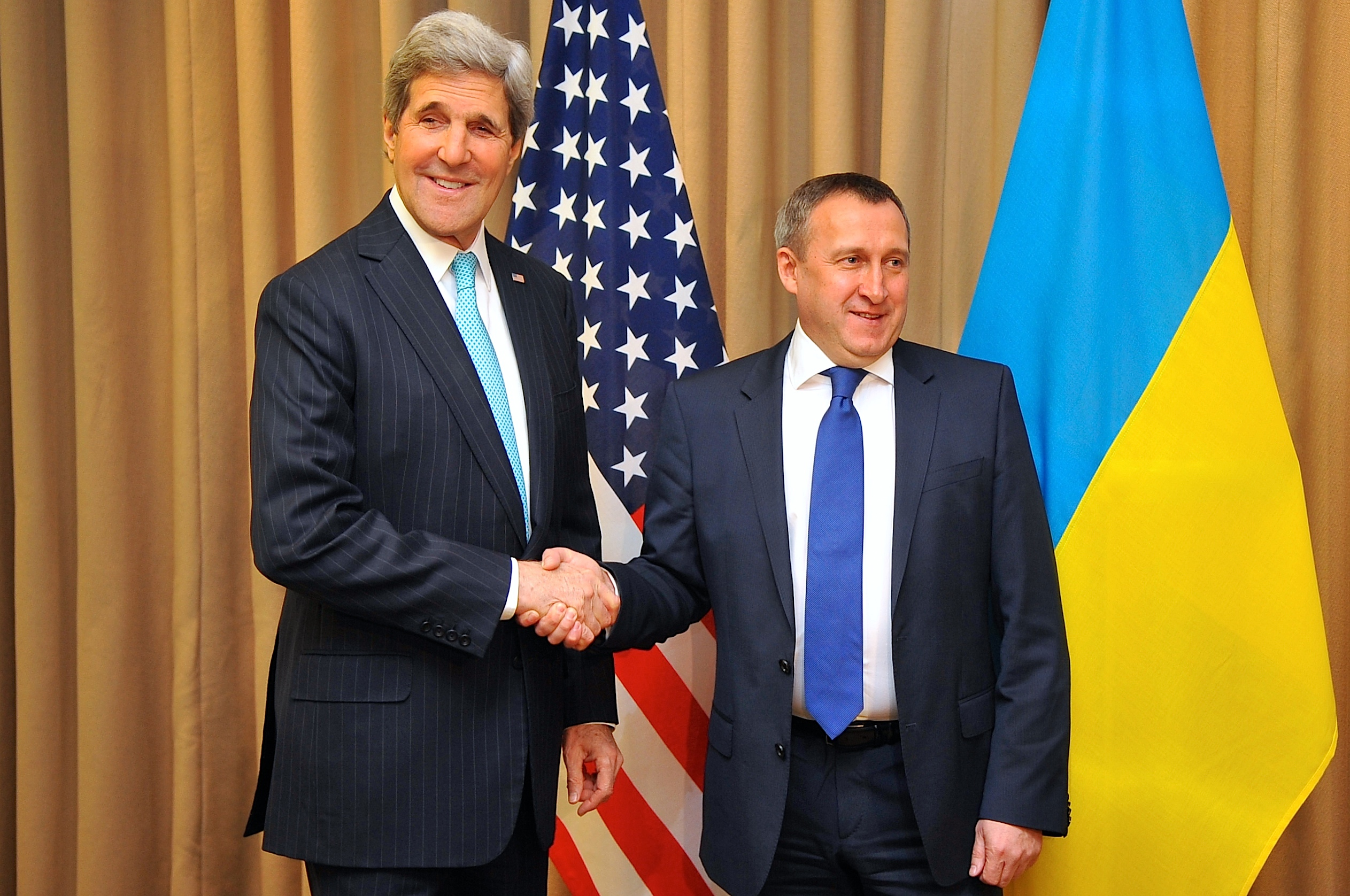
U.S. Secretary of State John Kerry with Ukrainian Foreign Minister Andrii Deshchytsia before the two joined with Russian and European Union officials about Ukraine in Geneva, Switzerland, on April 17, 2014.

- Anatoliy Zlenko (August 24, 1991 - August 25, 1994)
  - Hennadiy Udovenko (August 25, 1994 - September 16, 1994)
- Hennadiy Udovenko (September 16, 1994 - April 17, 1998)
- Borys Tarasiuk (April 17, 1998 - September 29, 2000)
- Anatoliy Zlenko (October 2, 2000 - September 2, 2003)
- Kostyantyn Gryshchenko (September 2, 2003 - February 3, 2005)
- Borys Tarasiuk (February 4, 2005 - December 1, 2006)
  - Borys Tarasiuk (December 5, 2006 - January 30, 2007)
  - Volodymyr Ohryzko (January 31, 2007 - March 21, 2007)
- Arseniy Yatseniuk (March 21, 2007 - December 18, 2007)
- Volodymyr Ohryzko (December 18, 2007 - March 3, 2009)
- Petro Poroshenko (October 9, 2009 - March 11, 2010)
- Kostyantyn Gryshchenko (March 11, 2010 - December 24, 2012)
- Leonid Kozhara (December 24, 2012 - February 23, 2014)
  - Andrii Deshchytsia (February 27, 2014 - June 19, 2014)
- Pavlo Klimkin (June 19, 2014 - 29 August 2019)
- Vadym Prystaiko (29 August 2019 - 4 March 2020)
- Dmytro Kuleba (4 March 2020 - 5 September 2024)
- Andrii Sybiha (5 September 2024 - Present)

== MFA of Ukraine spokespersons ==
- Ihor Dolhov (2001—2002)
- Markiyan Lubkivsky (2003—2005)
- Vasyl Filipchuk (2005—2006)
- Andrii Deshchytsia (2006—2008)
- Vasyl Kyrylych (2008—2009)
- Oleksandr Dykusarov (2010-2013)
- Yevhen Perebyinis (2013-2015)
- Mariana Betsa (2015—2018)
- Kateryna Zelenko (2018—2020)
- Oleh Nikolenko (2020-)

== See also ==
- Diplomatic missions of Ukraine
- Permanent Representative of Ukraine to the United Nations
- Public diplomacy of Ukraine
