= Mykhailo Parashchuk =

Ukrainian artist

Royal Order of Saints Cyril and Methodius Царски Орден на Кирил и Методий
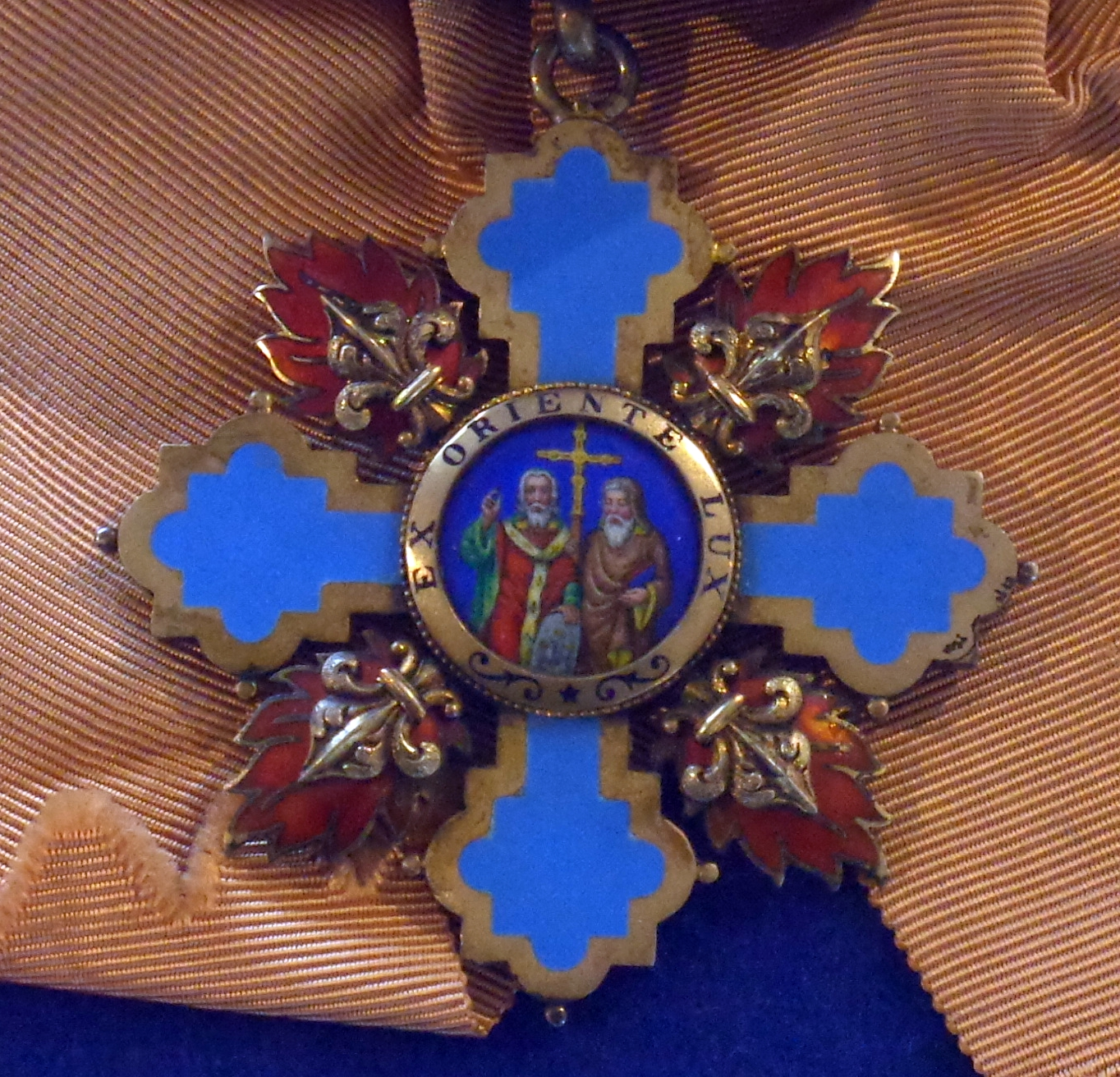
- The badge of the Order
- Royal house: House of Saxe-Coburg-Gotha-Koháry
- Religious affiliation: Bulgarian Orthodox
- Ribbon: Light Orange.
- Grades: Knight
- The ribbon of the Order

Mikhailo Parashchuk (Ukrainian: Михайло Паращук; Bulgarian: Михайло Парашчук; 16 November 1878 – 24 December 1963) was a Ukrainian sculptor who was active in Bulgaria from 1921 to his death in 1963 in Karlovo. Posthumously awarded the highest honor for Bulgarian culture: Order of Saints Cyril and Methodius.

== Early life ==
Parashchuk was born in Varvaryntsi in Ternopil Oblast (then in Galicia, Austria-Hungary, today in Ukraine). He enrolled in the Academy of Fine Arts Vienna, but graduated from the Julien Academy in Paris, France in 1910; in France, he was reportedly a student of Auguste Rodin. Before his graduation, Parashchuk worked in Lviv on monuments to noted Ukrainian writers.

== Life in Bulgaria ==
As a lecturer at the Academy of Fine Arts Munich, he was introduced to several Bulgarian artists and actors. During World War I, Parashchuk was a member of the Red Cross and organized an art workshop for Russian Army prisoners of war.

Parashchuk arrived in Sofia in 1921 as an International Red Cross volunteer. In the Bulgarian capital, Parashchuk was a very popular sculptor who contributed to the decoration of many major public buildings. Projects that Parashchuk executed include the ornamental frames of the Sofia Court House gates, the Bulgarian National Bank lion decorations and zodiac clock, history-related reliefs in the Rakovski Defence and Staff College, the facade decoration of the SS. Cyril and Methodius National Library, the interior of the Ministry of War and the geometric decoration of the Sofia University rectorate.

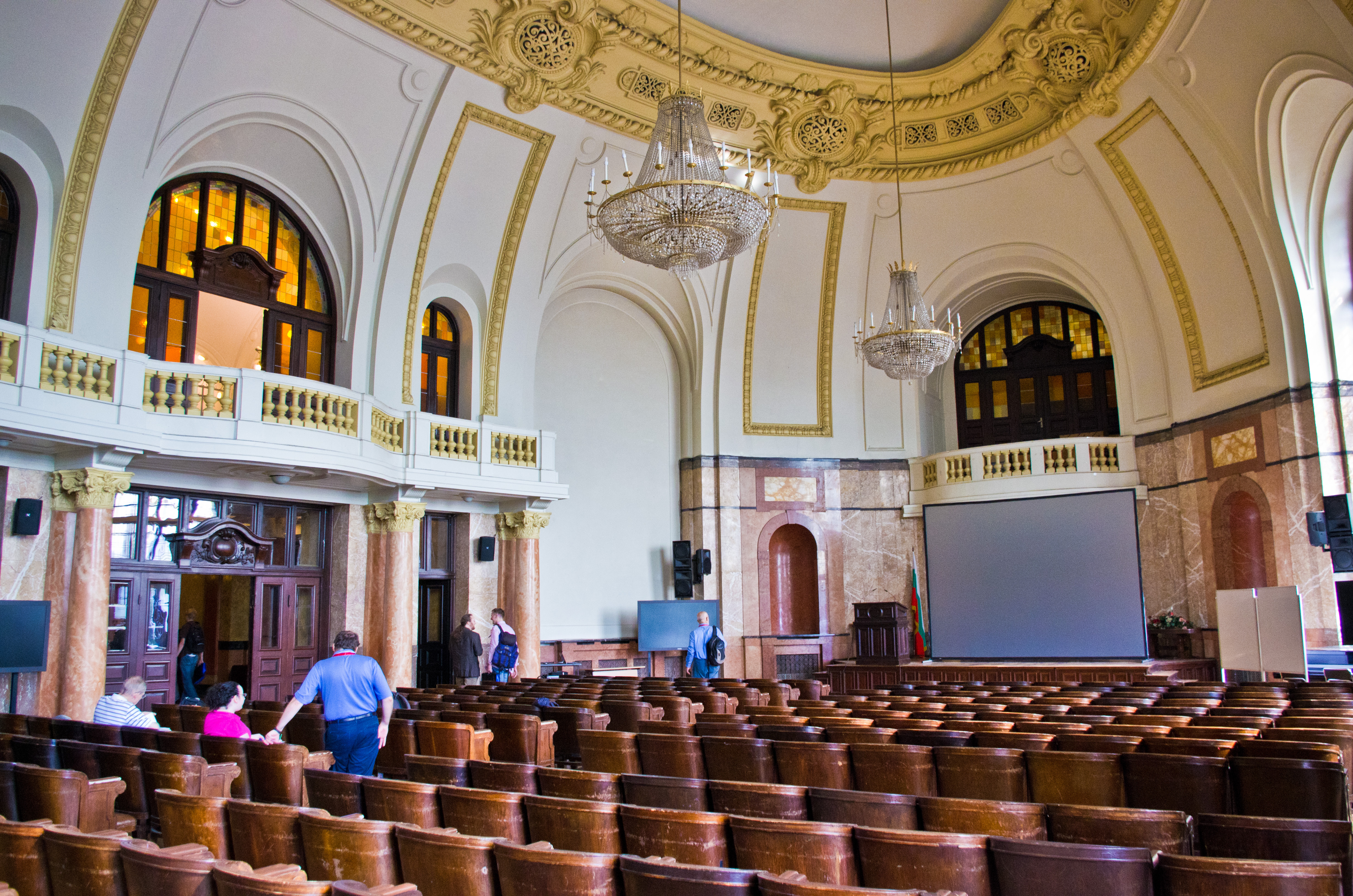
Aula of Sofia University in the Rectorate, the university main building

Outside the capital, Parashchuk created the sculptural decoration of buildings in Pernik, Velingrad, Kardzhali, Varna, Provadia and Sapareva Banya, as well as the Giurgiu-Rousse Friendship Bridge. Besides working in building decoration, Parashchuk was also engaged in sculpting busts and bas-reliefs of noted Bulgarians, including Vasil Levski, Peyo Yavorov, Gotse Delchev, Stefan Karadzha, Dimitar Blagoev, Hristo Botev and Aleko Konstantinov.

== Difficulties with Soviet government ==
Despite his popularity, Parashchuk was twice expelled from the Union of Bulgarian Artists in the 1940s and 1950s because he was accused of being a fascist, western spy or White Russian, although before World War II he was slandered as a "Bolshevik agent" and "Comintern member". It was not until 1963 that he was readmitted to the union after his second expulsion. Parashchuk was one of the leaders of the Ukrainian emigrants in Bulgaria: he was among the founders of the Ukrainian–Bulgarian Association and the Hromada Ukrainian cultural and educational associations.

Mikhaylo Parashchuk was married to Tsvetana Pekareva, the daughter of prominent agrarian politician and early BANU activist Yurdan Pekarev, mayor of Varna, Bulgaria in 1921. Reports point to the place of his death in Karlovo, though the most detailed biographies insist he died in Banya near Karlovo.

== Celebrating his legacy ==
An exhibition called "Strokes from the work of Mikhailo Parashchuk in Bulgaria" opened in the Sliven Art Gallery in 2024. The author of the exhibition is Ukrainian Yulia Krasovska, a member of the Society of Burgas Artists since 2016.

== Resting place ==
Parashchuk was buried in Sofia and his grave is decorated by a bust of the sculptor and a lion created by noted Bulgarian sculptor Vezhdi Rashidov.
