= Mariana Betsa =

Ukrainian diplomat

Mariana Betsa Беца Мар'яна Олександрівна
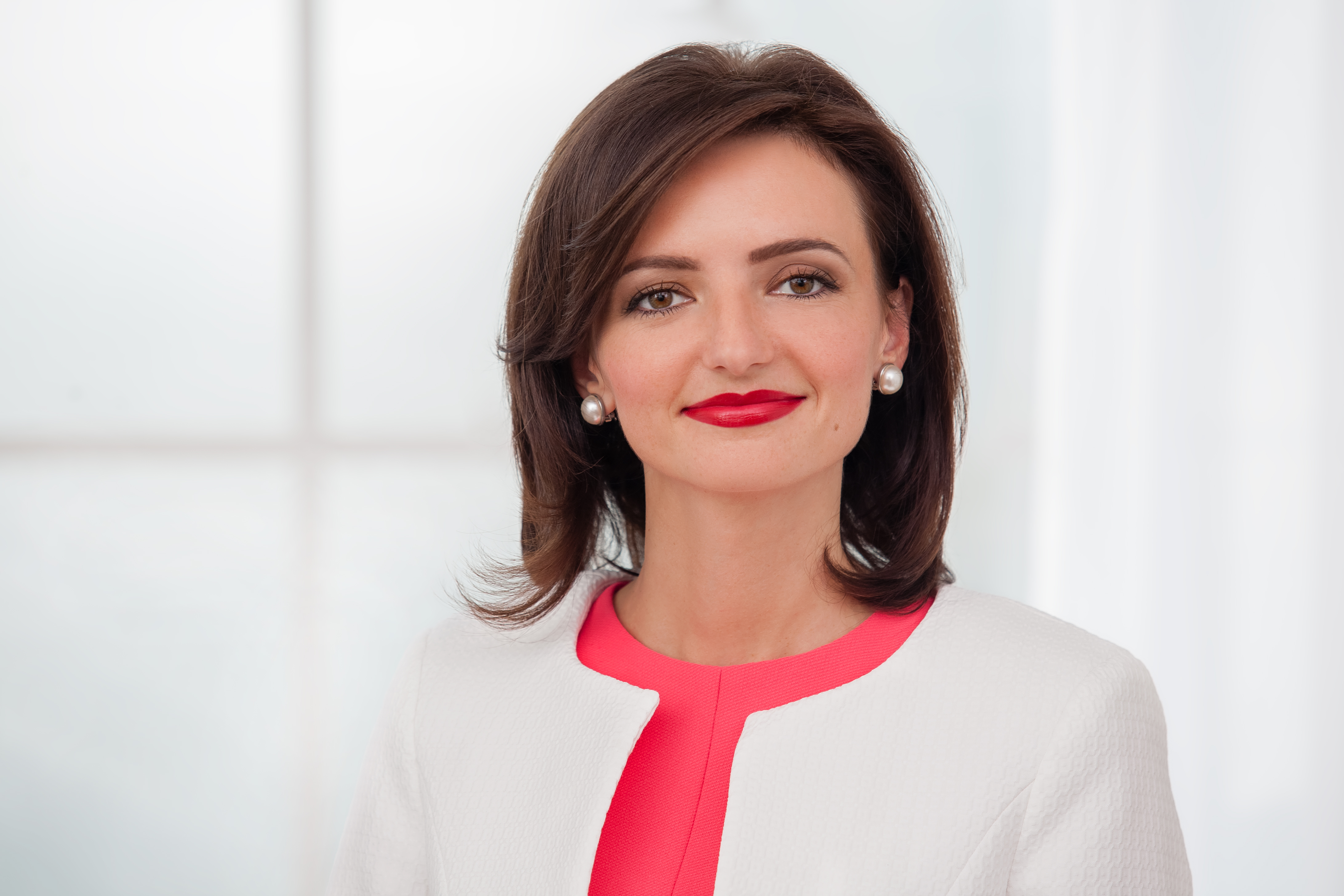

Deputy Foreign Minister of Ukraine
- Incumbent
- Assumed office 29 October 2024
- Prime Minister: Denys Shmyhal Yulia Svyrydenko
- Foreign Minister: Andrii Sybiha

Ambassador Extraordinary and Plenipotentiary of Ukraine to Estonia
- In office 2018–2023
- Preceded by: Viktor Kryzhanivsky

MFA of Ukraine Spokesperson
- In office 2015–2018
- Preceded by: Yevhen Perebyinis
- Succeeded by: Kateryna Zelenko

Personal details
- Born: 1 January 1978 (age 48) Kiev, Ukrainian SSR, Soviet Union (now Kyiv, Ukraine)
- Education: Kyiv University

Mariana Betsa (Ukrainian: Беца Мар'яна Олександрівна; born 1 January 1978) is a Ukrainian diplomat. MFA of Ukraine Spokesperson. Ambassador Extraordinary and Plenipotentiary of Ukraine.

== Early life and education ==
She was born in Kiev, on 1 January 1978. Betsa graduated from Taras Shevchenko National University of Kyiv in 1999. She holds a PhD in International Law, and is an English translator.

== Professional career and experience ==
At the diplomatic service in the Ministry of Foreign Affairs since 2001. In 2001-2005 and 2009-2012 Mariana worked at diplomatic positions in the Contracting-Law Department of the Ministry of Foreign Affairs of Ukraine.

Betsa worked twice abroad: from 2005 to 2009 at the Embassy of Ukraine in the Kingdom of the Netherlands, and from 2012 to June 2015 at the Permanent Mission of Ukraine to the international organizations in Vienna (OSCE issue).

During her time at the Foreign Ministry, she was trained at the University of Westminster, the Clingendhal Institute of International Relations (The Hague, Netherlands) and the Ministry of Foreign Affairs of the Republic of Indonesia.

Mariana is a specialist on international law, human rights, and the OSCE.

From 13 September 2018 - Ambassador Extraordinary and Plenipotentiary of Ukraine to Estonia.
