= Georgiy Afanasyev =

Ukrainian historian, politician, and diplomat (1848–1925)

Georgiy Afanasyev Афанасьев Георгий Емельянович Афанасьєв Георгій Омелянович
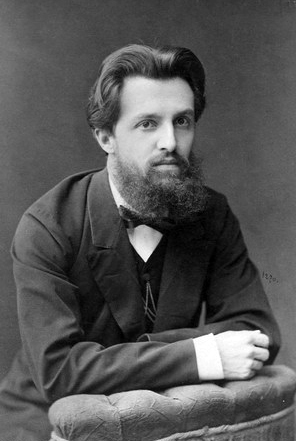

Ministry of Foreign Affairs of Ukraine
- In office November 14, 1918 – December 14, 1918
- Prime Minister: Serhiy Gerbel
- Preceded by: Dmytro Doroshenko
- Succeeded by: Volodymyr Chekhivsky

Personal details
- Born: February 28, 1848 Ufa, Orenburg Governorate, Russian Empire
- Died: December 15, 1925 (aged 77)
- Party: Belgrade, Kingdom of Yugoslavia
- Education: Odessa University

Georgiy Yemelyanovich Afanasyev (Russian: Георгий Емельянович Афанасьєв, Ukrainian: Георгій (Юрій) Омелянович Афанасьєв, romanized: Heorhii (Yurii) Omelianovych Afanasiev; 28 February 1848 in Ufa – 15 December 1925 in Belgrade) was a Ukrainian and Russian historian, politician, and diplomat. Minister of Foreign Affairs of the Ukrainian State (1918). Received a master's degree for his thesis: "The main points of the ministerial Turgot" (1884); and his doctoral dissertation was: "The Conditions of the Grain Trade in France at the End of the 18th Century" (1892). From 1888 he lectured at the Odessa University. He read in Odessa and Kiev.

== Professional career and experience ==
Georgiy Afanasyev graduated from the Faculty of Philology of Odessa University (1869). His main research interests are: history of ancient Egypt, the history of the Slavs and the Russian Empire, medieval and modern history of Britain and France, Russian literature and economics.

Since 1879 the cathedral Privatdozent at Odessa University universal history, while in the years 1879-1912 correspondent Odessa and Kiev a number of magazines and newspapers. In 1884 he defended his thesis and published a dedicated Turgotowi, in 1892 dissertation grain trading conditions in France in the 18th century. Some of his works have been published in France and England.

The recommendation of Sergei Witte, the then Minister of Finance of the Russian Empire in 1896, was director of the branch of the State Bank of the Russian Empire in Kiev. Branch of directed until 1918. One of his achievements was the construction of the new headquarters branch, opened in 1905 (now the headquarters of the National Bank of Ukraine). In the state controller Fedir Lyzohub government (from 3 May to 24 October 1918). After the declaration of Pavlo Skoropadsky Hetman of a federal state relationship with Russia, November 14, 1918, appointed to the post of Minister of Foreign Affairs in the Serhiy Gerbel government, a function held to fall as a result of the Ukrainian State directed against him rise and take power by the Directorate (14 December 1918).

After the fall of Hetmanatu went to Odessa, published in the newspaper Odesa lyst. Emigrated to the Kingdom of SHS, taught history at the University of Belgrade Faculty of Philology. He died in Belgrade. Part of his legacy is in the department of manuscripts of the National Library of Ukraine.

== Publications ==
- "The fate of Ireland", Odessa, 1887
- "Foreign Policy of Napoleon III", Odessa, 1885.
