= Georgiy Shevel =

Soviet politician and diplomat

- Георгій Шевель

Ministry of Foreign Affairs of the Ukrainian SSR
- In office 1970–1980
- Prime Minister: Volodymyr Shcherbytsky; Oleksandr Liashko
- Preceded by: Dmytro Bilokolos
- Succeeded by: Volodymyr Martynenko

leader of Komsomol of Ukraine
- In office 1950–1954
- Preceded by: Vladimir Syemichasny
- Succeeded by: Vasyl Drozdyenko

Personal details
- Born: 9 May 1919 Kharkiv
- Died: 16 November 1988 (aged 69)
- Party: Kyiv
- Education: University of Kharkiv

Georgiy Georgiyevich Shevel (Ukrainian: Гео́ргій Гео́ргійович Ше́вель, Russian: Гео́ргий Гео́ргиевич Ше́вель, 9 May 1919 – 16 November 1988) was a Soviet politician and diplomat. He was Minister of Foreign Affairs of the Ukrainian SSR (1970–1980).

== Education ==
Georgiy Shevel graduated from the Faculty of philology of the University of Kharkiv (1941).

== Professional career and experience ==
From 1944 to 1946 – he worked in the Komsomol of Ukraine, 2nd Secretary of the Lviv Regional Committee of the Komsomol, 1st Secretary of the Lviv Regional Committee of Komsomol.

From 1946 to 1950 – Secretary of the Central Committee of Komsomol of Ukraine propaganda, 3rd secretary of Komsomol of Ukraine, 2nd secretary of Komsomol of Ukraine.

In 1950–1954 – he was 1st secretary of Komsomol of Ukraine.

In 1954–1960 – He held the post 2nd secretary of the Kyiv City Committee of the Communist Party of Ukraine.

In 1960–1961 – he was secretary of the Kyiv Regional Committee of the Communist Party on agitation and propaganda.

In 1961–1970 – he headed of the Department of propaganda and agitation of the Central Committee of the Communist Party of Ukraine.

From 10 August 1970 to 18 November 1980 – Minister of Foreign Affairs of the Ukrainian SSR. Headed the Ukrainian delegation to sessions of the UN General Assembly.

== Diplomatic rank ==
- Ambassador Extraordinary and Plenipotentiary
