= Volodymyr Temnytsky =

Ukrainian lawyer, journalist and diplomat

Volodymyr Temnytsky Володимир Миколайович Темницький
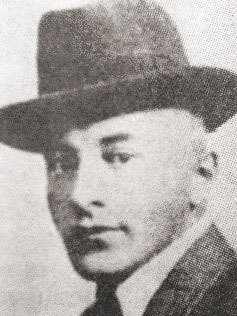

Ministry of Foreign Affairs of Ukraine
- In office 9 April 1919 – 27 August 1919
- Prime Minister: Borys Martos
- Preceded by: Kostiantyn Matsiyevych
- Succeeded by: Andriy Livytskyi

Personal details
- Born: 24 July 1879 Khlopivka, Chortkiv Raion
- Died: 26 January 1938 (aged 58) Lviv
- Party: Lviv
- Education: Lviv University

Volodymyr Temnytsky (Ukrainian: Володимир Миколайович Темницький; July 24, 1879 – January 26, 1938) was a Ukrainian lawyer, doctor of law, social and political activist, journalist and diplomat. Minister of Foreign Affairs of the Ukrainian People's Republic (1919).

== Professional career and experience ==
Temnytsky was born in a family of Greek Catholic priest. After graduating from high school, he joined the Department of Law of the University of Lviv. He was later expelled in 1901 for organizing a college student demonstration on 19 November, where students demanded the establishment of a separate Ukrainian university in Lviv. He continued his studies at the Jagiellonian University and the University of Vienna, graduating with a degree Doctor of Laws.

In 1899 he was one of the founders of the student organization ″Молода Україна″ (Young Ukraine) and belonged to its board of directors. He was also one of the organizers of several peasant strikes in Eastern Galicia in 1902. He was a member of the Ukrainian Social Democratic Party, where he served as Chairman of the party's Central Committee in 1914 to 1921.

After the outbreak of World War I, he joined the Ukrainian Sich Riflemen. He went to the Management of Combat Ukrainian Sich Riflemen. He was a member of the governing council of the Ukrainian, he was Vice-President and Secretary General of the Council of the Ukrainian - coordinating body of the Ukrainian political parties in Vienna. He collaborated with the Union for the Liberation of Ukraine.

In 1918, Temnytsky was elected to the National Council of the West Ukrainian People's Republic. After the act of union West Ukrainian People's Republic and Ukrainian People's Republic. In January - February 1919, Deputy Foreign Minister Volodymyr Chekhivsky government, from 9 April to 27 August 1919 Minister of Foreign Affairs of the Ukrainian People's Republic in the office of Borys Martos. Member of the delegation Ukrainian People's Republic to the Paris Peace Conference, 1919.

In 1921 he returned to Galicia, settled first in Stanislav, then in Stryi (1926) and Lviv (1928). He has a law practice, was active in the cooperative movement and as a writer of Ukrainian press.

December 9, 1928, he was Vice-President of the reborn of the Ukrainian Social Democratic Party. May 24, 1930 he was appointed by the governor of Lviv in the Provisional Council of the City of Lviv, the mandate held until May 1934, during the session of the council was trying to use the Ukrainian language.
