= Luka Palamarchuk =

Ukrainian politician

- Лука Паламарчук

Ministry of Foreign Affairs of the Ukrainian SSR
- In office 1953–1965
- Prime Minister: Demyan Korotchenko; Nikifor Kalchenko
- Preceded by: Anatoliy Baranovsky
- Succeeded by: Dmytro Bilokolos

Personal details
- Born: Luka Khomych Palamarchuk; 19 September 1906 Troshcha, Vinnitsa uezd, Podolia Governorate, Russian Empire
- Died: 26 December 1985 (aged 79) Kyiv, Ukrainian SSR, Soviet Union
- Education: Taras Shevchenko National University of Kyiv

Luka Khomych Palamarchuk (Ukrainian: Лука́ Хоми́ч Паламарчу́к; 19 September 1906 – 26 December 1985) was a Soviet and Ukrainian politician, journalist and diplomat. He was a Minister of Foreign Affairs of the Ukrainian SSR from 1953 to 1965.

== Education ==
Born in village Troshcha of Vinnitsa uezd, Palamarchuk graduated from the Faculty of History of the Taras Shevchenko National University of Kyiv (1949) and the Higher Party School of the Communist Party of Ukraine (1950).

== Professional career and experience ==
In 1929–1941 – he worked as a journalist.

In 1941–1942 – chairman of the Radio Committee of the Council of People's Commissars of the Ukrainian SSR.

In 1943–1952 – he was executive editor of "Radaynska Ukraine", he edited the Ukrainian satirical newspaper Perets'.

In 1952–1954 – Deputy Minister of Foreign Affairs of the Ukrainian SSR.

From 17 June 1953 to 11 May 1954 – Acting Minister of Foreign Affairs of the Ukrainian SSR.

From 11 May 1954 to 13 August 1965 – Minister of Foreign Affairs of the Ukrainian SSR Headed the Ukrainian delegation to sessions of the UN General Assembly.

From 13 August 1965 to 25 October 1972 – Ambassador Extraordinary and Plenipotentiary of the Soviet Union to Morocco.

He died in Kyiv at the age of 79.

== Diplomatic rank ==
- Ambassador Extraordinary and Plenipotentiary
