= List of ambassadors of Russia to Zambia =

Ambassador of the Russian Federation to the Republic of Zambia
- Emblem of the Russian Foreign Ministry
- Incumbent; Azim Yarkhmedov since 7 December 2021
- Ministry of Foreign Affairs; Embassy of Russia in Lusaka
- Style: His Excellency; The Honourable
- Reports to: Minister of Foreign Affairs
- Seat: Lusaka
- Appointer: President of Russia
- Term length: At the pleasure of the president
- Website: Embassy of Russia in Zambia

The ambassador of Russia to Zambia is the official representative of the president and the government of the Russian Federation to the president and the government of Zambia.

The ambassador to Zambia and his staff work at large in the Russian embassy in Lusaka. The current Russian ambassador to Zambia is Azim Yarkhmedov, incumbent since 7 December 2021.

== History of diplomatic relations ==
Diplomatic relations between the Soviet Union and Zambia were established on 24 October 1964, shortly after its declaration of independence from the Federation of Rhodesia and Nyasaland. Sergey Slipchenko was appointed as ambassador on 4 March 1965. With the dissolution of the Soviet Union in 1991, Zambia recognised the Russian Federation as its successor state on 31 December 1991. The incumbent Soviet ambassador, Eyzhen Poch, continued as ambassador from Russia until 1992.

== List of representatives of Russia to Zambia (1965–present) ==
=== Ambassadors of the Soviet Union to Zambia (1965–1991) ===
Name	Title	Appointment	Termination	Notes
Sergey Slipchenko	Ambassador	4 March 1965	10 June 1970	Credentials presented on 24 March 1965
Dmytro Bilokolos	Ambassador	10 June 1970	23 June 1976	Credentials presented on 9 October 1970
Vasily Solodovnikov	Ambassador	23 June 1976	11 July 1981	Credentials presented on 10 August 1976
Vladimir Cherednik	Ambassador	11 July 1981	10 June 1985	Credentials presented on 21 September 1981
Veniamin Likhachyov	Ambassador	10 June 1985	11 May 1987	
Oleg Miroshkhin	Ambassador	11 May 1987	14 August 1990	
Eyzhen Poch	Ambassador	14 August 1990	25 December 1991	

=== Ambassadors of the Russian Federation to Zambia (1991–present) ===
Name	Title	Appointment	Termination	Notes
Eyzhen Poch	Ambassador	25 December 1991	31 December 1992	
Mikhail Bocharnikov	Ambassador	31 December 1992	16 December 1996	
Vladimir Boyko	Ambassador	4 July 1997	28 August 2001	
Vladimir Dorokhin	Ambassador	28 August 2001	10 October 2005	
Anvar Azimov	Ambassador	10 October 2005	31 July 2008	
Boris Malakhov	Ambassador	6 October 2008	26 November 2012	Credentials presented on 22 January 2009; Died in post
Andrey Stolyarov	Chargé d'affaires	26 November 2012	3 July 2013	
Konstantin Kozhanov	Ambassador	3 July 2013	31 October 2019	Credentials presented on 7 November 2013
Aleksandr Boldyrev	Ambassador	31 October 2019	20 January 2021	Credentials presented on 12 December 2019; Died in post
Dmitry Yudin	Chargé d'affaires	20 January 2021	7 December 2021	
Azim Yarkhmedov	Ambassador	7 December 2021		Credentials presented on 5 May 2022

== See also ==
- List of ambassadors of Zambia to Russia
