= Andrii Sybiha =

Ukrainian politician (born 1975)

- Андрій Сибіга
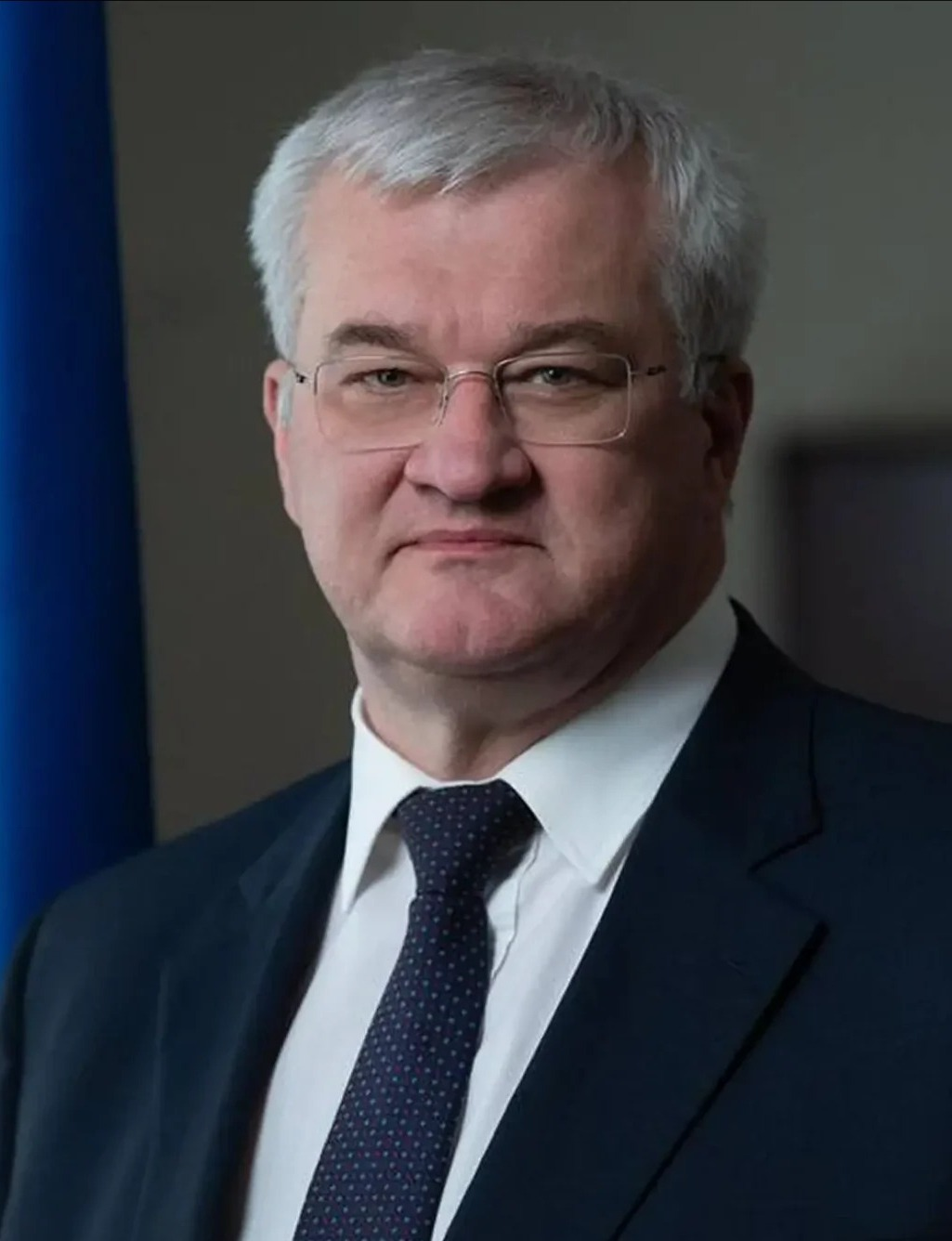

Minister of Foreign Affairs
- Incumbent
- Assumed office 5 September 2024
- President: Volodymyr Zelenskyy
- Prime Minister: Denys Shmyhal; Yulia Svyrydenko; Serhii Koretskyi
- Preceded by: Dmytro Kuleba

Deputy Head of the Office of the President of Ukraine
- In office 31 May 2021 – 12 April 2024
- President: Volodymyr Zelenskyy

Ukraine Ambassador to Turkey
- In office 22 August 2016 – 19 May 2021
- President: Petro Poroshenko; Volodymyr Zelenskyy
- Preceded by: Sergiy Korsunsky
- Succeeded by: Vasyl Bodnar

Personal details
- Born: Andrii Ivanovych Sybiha; 1 February 1975 (age 51) Zboriv, Ukrainian SSR, Soviet Union
- Education: University of Lviv
- Occupation: Politician, diplomat
- Awards

Andrii Ivanovych Sybiha (Ukrainian: Андрій Іванович Сибіга; born 1 February 1975) is a Ukrainian statesman, diplomat, and jurist who is serving as the Minister of Foreign Affairs of Ukraine since 5 September 2024. Before that, Sybiha was the Deputy Head of the Office of the President of Ukraine.

== Early life ==
Andrii Sybiha was born in Zboriv, Ternopil Oblast. In 1997, he graduated from University of Lviv, as a specialist in international relations. He is fluent in Russian, English and Polish.

== Career ==
From 2008–2012, he was an adviser-envoy of the Embassy of Ukraine in the Republic of Poland. In 2012–2016, he was the director of the Consular Service Department of MFA of Ukraine.

On 23 August 2016, he was appointed Ambassador Extraordinary and Plenipotentiary of Ukraine to the Republic of Turkey. On 19 May 2021, he was dismissed from his post by the decree of President Volodymyr Zelenskyy.

On 31 May 2021, he was appointed as the Deputy Head of the Office of the President of Ukraine.

At the start of the Russian invasion of Ukraine in 2022, Sybiha was among the first to announce Ukraine's formal application to join the European Union. Following the resignation of foreign minister Dmytro Kuleba in September 2024, he was appointed by President Zelenskyy to succeed him. His appointment passed in the Verkhovna Rada with 258 votes in favor.

== Awards ==
- Order of Merit, Third Class (21 August 2020) – for a significant personal contribution to state building, socio-economic, scientific-technical, cultural-educational development of Ukraine, significant labor achievements and high professionalism
- Order of Merit, Second Class (22 December 2021) – for significant personal contribution to strengthening international cooperation of Ukraine, many years of fruitful diplomatic activity and high professionalism
