= Dmytro Bilokolos =

Ukrainian politician and diplomat

- Дмитро Білоколос

Ministry of Foreign Affairs of the Ukrainian SSR
- In office 1966–1970
- Prime Minister: Volodymyr Shcherbytsky
- Preceded by: Luka Palamarchuk
- Succeeded by: Georgiy Shevel

Personal details
- Born: 5 February 1912 Yehorivka, Donetsk Oblast, Russian Empire
- Died: 9 February 1993 (aged 81) Kyiv, Ukraine
- Education: University of Kharkiv

Dmytro Zakharovych Bilokolos (Ukrainian: Дмитро Захарович Білоколос; 5 February 1912 – 9 February 1993) was a Ukrainian politician and diplomat. Minister of Foreign Affairs of the Ukrainian SSR (1966–1970). He was also Soviet ambassador to Zambia and Botswana (1970–76).

== Professional career and experience ==
Dmytro Bilokolos graduated from the Faculty of History of the National University of Kharkiv (1936).

From 1936 to 1941, he worked history teacher, director of high school in Donetsk. From 1941 to 1945, he was a veteran of World War II. From 1947 to 1952, he was Head of the department of agitation and propaganda secretary of the Donetsk City Committee of the Communist Party of Ukraine. Between 1952 and 1955, he studied of the Academy of Social Sciences in Moscow. In 1955, he headed of the Department of Science and Culture, Secretary of the Donetsk Regional Committee of the Communist Party.

From 16 March 1966 to 11 June 1970, he was Minister of Foreign Affairs of the Ukrainian SSR. During this period, he headed the Ukrainian delegation to XXI–XXIV sessions of the UN General Assembly. From 10 June 1970 to 23 June 1976 – Ambassador Extraordinary and Plenipotentiary of the Soviet Union in Zambia. From 16 September 1970 to 23 June 1976 – Ambassador Extraordinary and Plenipotentiary of the Soviet Union in Botswana in combination
