= List of ambassadors of Ukraine to the United States =

Ambassador of Ukraine to the United States of America
- Посол України в Сполучені Штати Америки
- Incumbent; Vacant since 3 August 2026
- Residence: Embassy of Ukraine, Washington, D.C.
- Appointer: President of Ukraine
- Inaugural holder: Oleh Bilorus as Ambassador Extraordinary and Plenipotentiary
- Formation: 3 January 1992; 34 years ago
- Website: usa.mfa.gov.ua/en

The Ambassador Extraordinary and Plenipotentiary of Ukraine to the United States of America (Ukrainian: Надзвичайний і Повноважний посол України в Сполучені Штати Америки) is the ambassador of Ukraine to the United States. The ambassador is responsible for diplomatically representing and promoting Ukraine's interests in the U.S., with Ukrainian ambassadors having full authority to act on behalf of the Ukrainian government. Ambassadors are appointed and dismissed by the President of Ukraine, typically on the recommendation of the Minister of Foreign Affairs. If the ambassador has an absence from their position or if the position is left vacant, a Chargé d'Affaires ad interim (Ukrainian: Тимчасовий повірений у справах), typically the deputy chief of mission, an attaché, or some other member of the embassy's diplomat staff, will be selected to fulfill the position's responsibilities in the intervening time until the ambassador returns or a new one is appointed. Since the start of the ambassadorship to the U.S., individuals holding the position have also typically been co-accredited as the head Ukrainian diplomat to multiple small neighboring countries as well as some international organizations such as the OAS. These concurrent responsibilities are assigned at the discretion of the Ukrainian president and agreement of the represented country/organization, in which the ambassador to the U.S. is authorized to represent Ukrainian interests in the additional countries/organizations (with no day-to-day physical presence in those countries/organizations) as an ambassador-at-large, working remotely on a part-time basis from the Ukrainian embassy in Washington, D.C. Appointments to ambassador-at-large positions are generally carried out at some later point during the ambassador to the U.S.'s tenure.

The country's first independent diplomatic mission to the U.S. began in 1919, when the executive council of the Ukrainian People's Republic (UPR), a historical predecessor to modern-day Ukraine, approved on January 6 the mission's budget and appointed its staff on January 10. Officially titled the Extraordinary Diplomatic Mission of the UPR to the US, the mission was established approximately a year after the UPR government had declared its independence from the Russian Empire. The first head of the mission was Ukrainian politician Yevhen Holitsynsky who served as the chief of the mission from his appointment on 10 January 1919 until his reassignment as the UPR's ambassador to Estonia on 8 April later that year. Following Holitsynsky's reassignment, Ukrainian politician and writer Yulian Bachynsky who had previously served as part of the mission staff was appointed acting head before the mission was dissolved by the UPR government due to significant financial strain as it soon after went into exile when the country's territory was divided between the Second Polish Republic and the pro-Soviet Russian states of Soviet Belarus and Soviet Ukraine in the Treaty of Riga, signed on 18 March 1921. Due to the lack of formal U.S. recognition of the independence of the UPR during its existence, the UPR had no embassy in the U.S. (i.e. no permanent diplomatic mission) and thus, both Holitsynsky and Bachynsky served as envoys rather than ambassadors.

From 1933 (Note: The U.S. recognized the Soviet Union, which included the Ukrainian Soviet Socialist Republic as one of its constituent republics, on 16 November 1933. In the time prior to that, from the breaking off of relations on 6 December 1917, following the overthrow of the U.S. supported Russian Provisional Government, until the 1933 recognition, the U.S. had no formal diplomatic relations with the Soviet Union.) to 1991, Ukraine was represented to the United States and the rest of the international community as part of the Soviet Union, although it gained de jure separate membership in the United Nations as the Ukrainian SSR at the UN's founding in 1945, as well as in a number of other intergovernmental organizations over the years. When the Soviet Union began to dissolve, the Supreme Soviet of the Ukrainian SSR adopted an act on 24 August 1991 declaring the country's independence as modern-day Ukraine. Following a national referendum in favor of independence and the country's signing of the Belovezha Accords, which formally dissolved the Soviet Union, the United States recognized Ukraine on 25 December 1991. After the U.S.'s recognition and the start of bilateral relations on 3 January 1992, Ukrainian diplomat Sergiy Kulyk served as the Chargé d'Affaires of the Ukrainian diplomatic mission as it established itself in its embassy in Washington, D.C. On 3 June 1992, Ukrainian politician and professor Oleh Bilorus was appointed by President Leonid Kravchuk as the first ambassador to the U.S. Since Bilorus left the position on 12 September 1994, ten individuals have been appointed as ambassadors to the U.S. The longest-serving ambassador is Oleksandr Motsyk, who represented Ukraine from 11 June 2010 to 14 April 2015, while the shortest tenure as an ambassador is held by Anton Buteyko, who served from 18 November 1998 to 24 December 1999. Oksana Markarova, ambassador from 25 February 2021 to 27 August 2025, is the first woman to serve as ambassador to the U.S. The most recent ambassador is Olha Stefanishyna, who was dismissed from the position by President Volodymyr Zelenskyy on 3 August 2026 amid an investigation into failure to disclose assets.

== List ==
Ukrainian diplomatic representatives to the US
| Name (in Ukrainian) (Note: Ukrainian names link to the Ukrainian Wikipedia articles of each individual.) | Photo | Title (Note: The full title for Ukrainian diplomats to the U.S. with the status of an ambassador is "Ambassador Extraordinary and Plenipotentiary of Ukraine to the United States of America" (Ukrainian: Надзвичайний і Повноважний посол України в Сполучені Штати Америки, romanized: Nadzvychainyi i Povnovazhnyi posol Ukrainy v Spolucheni Shtaty Ameryky). This is shortened to simply "Ambassador" in the table. For Ukrainian diplomats temporarily fulfilling the position, the full title is Chargé d'Affaires ad interim (Ukrainian: Тимчасовий повірений у справах, romanized: Tymchasovyi povirenyj u spravakh); this is abbreviated to "Chargé d'Affaires a.i." in the table. Other accredited diplomatic positions held concurrently by the ambassador during their U.S. tenure are indicated in footnotes next to their title, if applicable.) | Country | Tenure | | | Refs. |
| Name (in Ukrainian) | Photo | Title | Country | Start date (Note: For ambassadors, the date of their appointment by presidential decree is used. For Chargés d'Affaires a.i., the start date of their fulfillment of the position's responsibilities is used. Most Chargés d'Affaires a.i. time in office begins the same date as the end of the preceding ambassador's tenure except in the case of Sergiy Kulyk, who began with the start of official Ukraine–United States diplomatic relations on 3 January 1992.) | End date (Note: For ambassadors, the date of their dismissal by presidential decree is used. For Chargés d'Affaires a.i., the date of the president's appointment of the succeeding ambassador is used.) | Length | Refs. |
|---|---|---|---|---|---|---|---|
| Yevhen Holitsynsky (Євген Голіцинський) | | Head of diplomatic mission | Ukrainian People's Republic (1918–1921) (Note: The Ukrainian People's Republic (UPR) is a historical predecessor of Ukraine. It existed from January 1918, when the UPR declared its full independence, until November 1920, when the last remaining UPR-controlled areas were occupied by the Soviet Red Army, with a brief interruption from April to December in 1918, when the UPR was ousted and replaced by the authoritarian Ukrainian State. The final signing of the Treaty of Riga on 18 March 1921 divided the former territories of the UPR between Poland and Soviet Ukraine (a puppet state of Soviet Russia). After its expulsion in November 1920 and the division of its territory, the UPR government continued to exist in exile without international recognition until 22 August 1992, when it recognized modern-day Ukraine as its successor.) | 10 January 1919 | 8 April 1919??? | 88 days | |
| Yulian Bachynsky (Юліан Бачинський) | | Head of diplomatic mission | Ukrainian People's Republic (1918–1921) | 8 April 1919 | 28 December 1921 | 2 years, 264 days | |
| Sergiy Kulyk (Сергій Кулик) | | Chargé d'Affaires a.i. | Ukraine (1991–present) (Note: Modern-day Ukraine declared independence on 24 August 1991.) | 3 January 1992 | 3 June 1992 | 152 days (Note: Kulyk served as Chargé d'Affaires a.i. in 1992, from the start of diplomatic relations on 3 January until Oleh Bilorus' appointment as the first ambassador on 3 June.) | |
| Oleh Bilorus (Олег Білорус) | | Ambassador | Ukraine (1991–present) | 3 June 1992 | 12 September 1994 | 2 years, 101 days | |
| Yuriy Shcherbak (Юрій Щербак) | | Ambassador (Note: Concurrently served as ambassador to Mexico from 27 February 1997 to 18 November 1998.) | Ukraine (1991–present) | 22 October 1994 | 18 November 1998 | 4 years, 27 days | |
| Anton Buteyko (Антон Бутейко) | | Ambassador | Ukraine (1991–present) | 18 November 1998 | 24 December 1999 | 1 year, 36 days | |
| Kostyantyn Gryshchenko (Костянтин Грищенко) | | Ambassador (Note: Concurrently served as ambassador to Antigua and Barbuda from 24 September 2001 to 2 September 2003.) | Ukraine (1991–present) | 28 January 2000 | 2 September 2003 | 3 years, 217 days | |
| Mykhailo Reznik (Михайло Резнік) | | Ambassador (Note: Concurrently served as ambassador to Antigua and Barbuda from 5 July 2004 to 21 June 2005.) | Ukraine (1991–present) | 10 November 2003 | 21 June 2005 | 1 year, 223 days | |
| Sergiy Korsunsky (Сергій Корсунський) | | Chargé d'Affaires a.i. | Ukraine (1991–present) | 21 June 2005 | 19 December 2005 | 181 days (Note: Chargé d'Affaires a.i. in 2005 from Mykhailo Reznik's dismissal on 21 June to Oleh Shamshur's appointment on 19 December.) | |
| Oleh Shamshur (Олег Шамшур) | | Ambassador (Note: Concurrently served as ambassador to Antigua and Barbuda from 30 March 2006 to 12 May 2010.) | Ukraine (1991–present) | 19 December 2005 | 12 May 2010 | 4 years, 144 days | |
| Oleksandr Motsyk (Олександр Моцик) | | Ambassador (Note: Concurrently served as ambassador to Antigua and Barbuda from 15 November 2010 to 14 April 2015, and as ambassador to Trinidad and Tobago from 14 September 2011 to 14 April 2015.) | Ukraine (1991–present) | 11 June 2010 | 14 April 2015 | 4 years, 307 days | |
| Yaroslav Brisiuck (Ярослав Брисюк) | | Chargé d'Affaires a.i. | Ukraine (1991–present) | 14 April 2015 | 10 July 2015 | 87 days (Note: Chargé d'Affaires a.i. in 2015 from Oleksandr Motsyk's dismissal on 14 April to Valeriy Chaly's appointment on 10 July.) | |
| Valeriy Chaly (Валерій Чалий) | | Ambassador (Note: Concurrently served as ambassador to Antigua and Barbuda from 24 November 2015 to 19 July 2019, and as ambassador to Trinidad and Tobago from 12 April 2016 to 19 July 2019.) | Ukraine (1991–present) | 10 July 2015 | 19 July 2019 | 4 years, 9 days | |
| Andrii Yanevskyi (Андрій Яневський) | | Chargé d'Affaires a.i. | Ukraine (1991–present) | 19 July 2019 | 18 December 2019 | 152 days (Note: Chargé d'Affaires a.i. in 2019 from Valeriy Chaly's dismissal on 19 July to Volodymyr Yelchenko's appointment on 18 December.) | |
| Volodymyr Yelchenko (Володимир Єльченко) | | Ambassador (Note: Concurrently served as ambassador to both Antigua and Barbuda and Jamaica from 20 July 2020 to 25 February 2021.) | Ukraine (1991–present) | 18 December 2019 | 25 February 2021 | 1 year, 69 days | |
| Oksana Markarova (Оксана Маркарова) | | Ambassador (Note: Concurrently serving as ambassador to Antigua and Barbuda from May 2021 and as the Permanent Observer of Ukraine to the Organization of American States from July 2023.) | Ukraine (1991–present) | 25 February 2021 | 27 August 2025 | 4 years, 183 days | |
| Olha Stefanishyna (Ольга Стефанішина) | | Ambassador | Ukraine (1991–present) | 27 August 2025 | 3 August 2026 | 341 days | |

== See also ==
- Ukraine–United States relations
- Embassy of Ukraine, Washington, D.C.
- Embassy of the United States, Kyiv
- Ambassadors of the United States to Ukraine
- Permanent Representative of Ukraine to the United Nations – Ukraine's main separate diplomatic representative recognized by the U.S. during the Soviet Union
