= Maria Rudenko =

Ukrainian artist and folklorist (1915–2003)

Maria Avksentievna Rudenko (Ukrainian: Марія Авксентіївна Руденко; 14 February 1915 - 14 May 2003) was a Ukrainian artist, folklorist, and ethnographer. Honored Cultural Worker of Ukraine (1973).

== Early life and education ==
Maria Avksentiivna Rudenko was born on 14 February 1915, in the village of Sloboda-Yarishivska, Mohyliv-Podilskyi Raion, Vinnytsia Oblast, in what was then the Russian Empire.

Rudenko's creative personality was formed in her family. Mother, Hanna, father, Avksentiy, and aunt Maria sang in the village choir from a young age, directed by Hryhoriy Hrynevych, a student of Mykola Leontovich.

Rudenko graduated from a seven-year school in the village of Yaryshiv. Later she finished teaching courses in Mohyliv-Podilskyi and taught part-time at Tulchyn Pedagogical School.

In 1948 she graduated from Vinnytsia Pedagogical Institute. Rudenko taught in the villages of Transnistria.

== Work ==
For a long time, Rudenko managed the children's folklore ensemble "Sonechko" in her native village. For over 30 years, she directed the folklore and ethnographic ensemble "Horlytsia" in the Sloboda-Yarishivska village. She was a master of needlework, embroidery, decorative painting, as well as a local historian, ethnographer, and folklorist.

Maria Rudenko was the first to revive vytynankas, a type of Ukrainian folk decorative art. She learned to make vytynankas from her grandmother Odarka. Her works marked the beginning of a unique collection of modern carvings in the State Museum of Ethnography of the Peoples of the former Soviet Union.

Rudenko participated in international exhibitions in Chelyabinsk, Kharkiv, Lviv, and other cities. She was awarded various diplomas. Her works are included in the expositions of the Decorative Museum of Ethnography in Saint Petersburg (Russia) and the Museum of Folk Architecture and Life of Ukraine in the village of Pyrohiv, where she demonstrated her carvings and painted the house. Rudenko collected folk songs, riddles, proverbs, fairy tales, legends, omens, and rituals throughout her life. For the first time, the world saw her creative works in 1949, when the regional publishing house published a book containing her songs along with the works of Hnat Tantsyura, Ivan Glynskyi, and Evhen Horb.

Maria Rudenko died on 14 May 2003.

== Commemoration ==
A small planet discovered by a Crimean astronomer Nikolai Chernykh was named "Horlytsia" in honor of the ethnographic ensemble directed by Maria Rudenko.

In 1993, the All-Ukrainian Vytynanka holiday was started in Mogilev-Podilskyi. In 2003, the ethnography and folk art museum was named after Maria Rudenko, where her creative heritage is preserved.

In 2005, the 3rd All-Ukrainian folk art festival, "Ukrainian Vytynanka," was held, dedicated to the 90th anniversary of the birth of the folk craftswoman.
