= Embassy of France, Nairobi =

- Logo of the embassy
- Address: Peponi Gardens, off Peponi road
- Coordinates: 1.249722°S 36.801944°E
- Opened: 1963
- Ambassador: Arnaud Suquet
- Website: https://ke.diplomatie.gouv.fr

The French embassy in Kenya is the diplomatic mission of France to Kenya. It is located in Nairobi, the capital of Kenya, and its ambassador since 2022 is Arnaud Suquet, who is also the permanent representative of France to the United Nations Office in Nairobi. He also serves as the representative of France to Somalia, as the diplomatic mission to Mogadishu was closed in 1993.

== Overview ==
The embassy is located in a cul-de-sac in Peponi Gardens in a standalone building, close to Peponi Road, in Nairobi. It also has a consulate.

== Ambassadors of France to Kenya ==
From	To	Ambassador
1963	1964	René Servoise
1964	1968	Jean de Beausse (d)
1968	1969	Claude Arnaud
1969	1972	René Millet
1972	1976	Olivier Deleau
1976	1980	Christian Girard
1980	1984	Roger Duzer
1984	1987	Michel Van Grevenynghe
1987	1990	Jacques Leclerc
1990	1993	Michel de Bonnecorse
1993	1996	Michel Rougagnou
1996	2000	Jacques Depaigne
2000	2004	Pierre Jacquemot
2004	2006	Hubert Fournier
2006	2010	Élisabeth Barbier
2010	2013	Étienne de Poncins
2013	2016	Rémi Maréchaux
2016	2018	Antoine Sivan
2018	2022	Aline Kuster-Ménager
2022	present	Arnaud Suquet (d)

== Diplomatic relations ==
Multilateral diplomacy, that is, diplomacy conducted between at least three states, became very important in the 20th century, especially after the creation of the United Nations. Nairobi is one of the four United Nations headquarter cities, alongside New York, Vienna and Geneva, which gives the French ambassador to Kenya a unique postition within the French diplomatic apparatus.

=== Somalia ===
Somalia, a neighbouring country to Kenya, has had a French diplomatic mission since 1960. However, diplomatic relations with them were severed and the embassy was closed in June 1993. Since then, the French ambassador to Kenya has been only a representative of France. On 21 January 2013, signalling Paris' desire to build new relations after the election of president Hassan Sheikh Mohamud as leader in September 2012, the French ambassador of France to Nairobi was accredited by the Somali government. This appointment marked a considerable milestone in thee relations of the two countries, marked by two decades of civil war after the fall of the dictator Mohammed Siad Barre in 1991.

== Consulates ==
As well as the consulate in Nairobi, there is also another consulate in Mombasa.

=== French community ===
As of 31 December 2016, 1657 French citizens are registered with the consular authorities in Kenya.

=== Electoral districts ===
After the law of 22 July 2013 reformed the representation of French citizens living outside of France with the establishment of consular councils within diplomatic missions, French citizens from a district covering Burundi, Kenya, Rwanda, Uganda, Zambia and Zimbabwe elected three consular councillors for six years. They have three roles:

1. They are the locally-based elected representatives for French citizens living abroad
2. They belong to one of 15 districts who elect among themselves the members of the Assembly of French Citizens Abroad,
3. They become part of the electoral college which elects the senators representing French citizens living outside of France.

For the elections of the Assembly of French Citizens Abroad, Kenya until 2014 was part of the electoral district of Nairobi, which also contained Burundi, Rwanda, Tanzania and Uganda, and accounted for two seats. Kenya now belongs to the electoral district "Central, Eastern and Southern Africa" headquartered in Libreville and electing 5 of its consular councillors to serve among the 90 members of the Assembly of French Citizens Abroad.

For the election of legislative constituencies of French citizens abroad, Kenya is in the 10th district.

== See also ==
- Ministry for Europe and Foreign Affairs (France)
- List of diplomatic missions of France
- Embassy of Kenya in France
