= Yaroslav Brisiuck =

Ukrainian diplomat (born 1975)

- Ярослав Брисюк
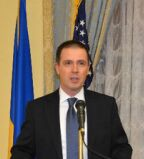
- Brisiuck in 2015

Ambassador of Ukraine to the United States
- In office April 10, 2015 – July 10, 2015
- President: Petro Poroshenko
- Prime Minister: Arseniy Yatsenyuk
- Preceded by: Olexander Motsyk
- Succeeded by: Valeriy Chaly

Personal details
- Born: 14 May 1975 (age 51) Kiev, Ukrainian SSR, Soviet Union
- Education: Taras Shevchenko National University of Kyiv
- Profession: Lawyer and diplomat

Yaroslav Brisiuck (Ukrainian: Ярослав Володимирович Брисюк; born May 14, 1975) is a Ukrainian diplomat. Ambassador of Ukraine to the United States (2015).

== Education ==
Yaroslav Brisiuck graduated from Taras Shevchenko National University of Kyiv, Institute of international relations, faculty of international law, postgraduate course (1997). He studied as an exchange student at Davidson College in North Carolina (1993–1994) and studied at Temple University School of Law in Philadelphia (1999–2002), received a Juris Doctor degree.

== Career ==
From 2000 - 2001 - he worked as a law clerk at the Supreme Court of New Jersey.

From 2001 - 2004 – he was law clerk, then attorney at law the law firm Marks & Sokolov, Philadelphia

In 2002 - he was admitted to practice in Pennsylvania.

From April 2004 - he held positions of 2nd Secretary, 1st Secretary, then acting director of the U.S. and Canada Office Ministry of Foreign Affairs of Ukraine.

From 2006 - 2008 - he was posted at the Embassy of Ukraine in Canada as 1st Secretary for political affairs.

From 2009 - 2011 – he was director of the United States and Canada Office at the Ukrainian Ministry of Foreign Affairs.

In 2011 - he was posted as Counselor for political affairs at the Embassy of Ukraine in the United States.

From 2012 - he is Minister-Counselor and Deputy Chief of Mission at the Embassy of Ukraine in the United States.

From 25.07.2015 to 10.07.2015 – Chargé d'affaires of Ukraine in the United States.

== Diplomatic rank ==
Holds a diplomatic rank of Envoy Extraordinary and Plenipotentiary, 2nd Class.

== See also ==
- Embassy of Ukraine, Washington, D.C.
