= Taras Kachka =

Ukrainian politician (born 1979)

- Тарас Качка
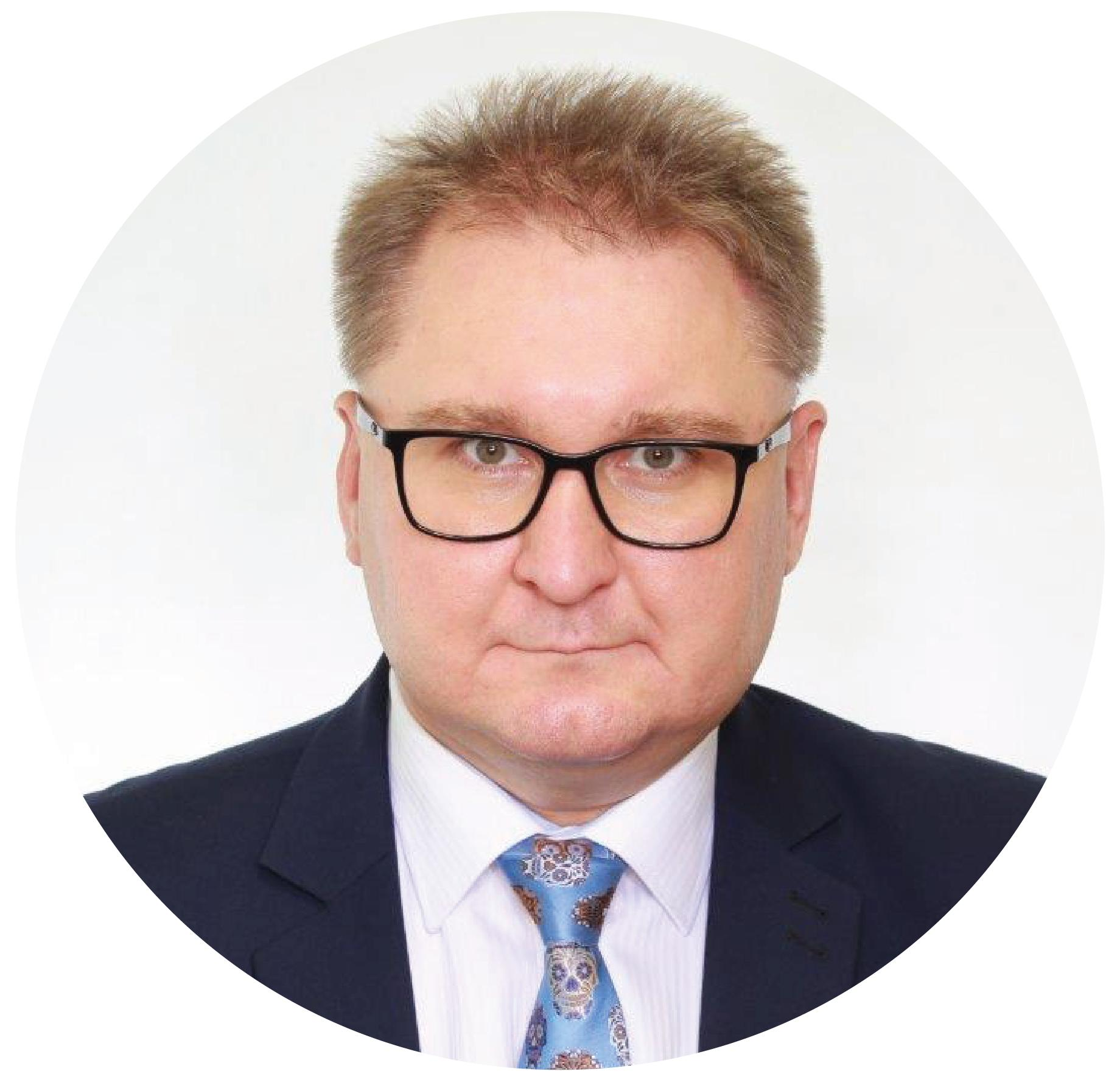

Deputy Prime Minister of Ukraine for European and Euro-Atlantic Integration
- Incumbent
- Assumed office 17 July 2025
- President: Volodymyr Zelenskyy
- Prime Minister: Yulia Svyrydenko
- Preceded by: Olha Stefanishyna

Personal details
- Born: 1979 (age 46–47) Dymytrove, Ukrainian SSR, Soviet Union (now Oleksandriiske, Ukraine)
- Education: Kyiv University

Taras Andriyovych Kachka (Ukrainian: Тарас Андрійович Качка; born 28 November 1979) is a Ukrainian politician serving as Deputy Prime Minister of Ukraine for European and Euro-Atlantic integration since 2025. From 2019 to 2025, he served as Trade Representative of Ukraine.

== Early life ==
Kachka was born in 1979 within the village of Dymytrove, which was located within the Kirovohrad Oblast of the Ukrainian SSR (now Oleksandriiske, Ukraine). After graduating secondary school, he graduateed with a bachelor's degree in law from the International Scientific and Technical University named after Academician Yuriy Bugay (ISTU) and later a master's degree in law from Kyiv University.

== Career ==
After graduating, he served as a senior specialist from 2001 to 2004 at the Center for European and Comparative Law of the Ministry of Justice of Ukraine. He was then, from 2005 to 2009, deputy director and Head of the State Department for Harmonization of Legislation within the Ministry of Justice. In 2009 he was promoted to First Deputy Head of that department, before in 2011 transferring to the Ministry of Agrarian Policy and Food. There, for a year, he was Head of the Department of International Economic Relations. He then joined the American Chamber of Commerce in Ukraine, serving from 2014 to 2015 as vice president for Strategic Development and as Acting President for it.

In September 2019, he was appointed Deputy Minister for Development of Economy, Trade and Agriculture – Trade Representative of Ukraine.

== Deputy Prime Minister for European and Euro-Atlantic integration ==
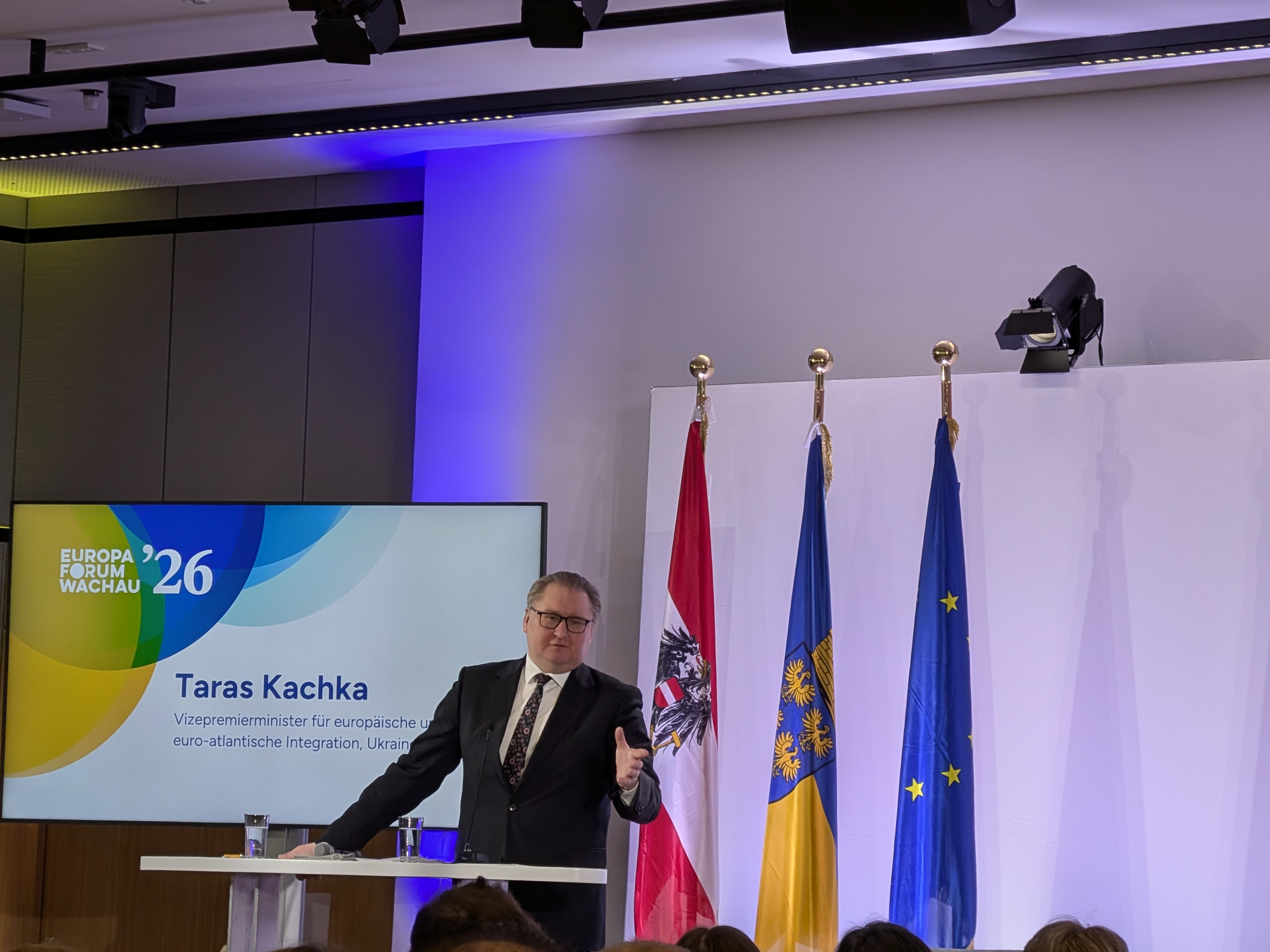
Taras Kachka

In his role as Deputy Prime Minister, Kachka has been an advocate for the accelerated Accession of Ukraine to the European Union. He has stated that Ukraine aims to achieve full technical integration into the EU energy market by 2027, noting that legislation had already been prepared to align Ukraine with nine EU energy acts, and was just waiting for final parliamentary approval by the Verkhovna Rada. He has also supported a broader goal of Ukraine joining the EU by 2027, with the Financial Times calling him one of the top Ukrainian officials promoting 2027 as a realistic target for membership if reforms and negotiation could progress. However, some EU governments have expressed skepticism about the 2027 date.
