= Valeriy Chaly (diplomat) =

Ukrainian diplomat

- Валерій Чалий
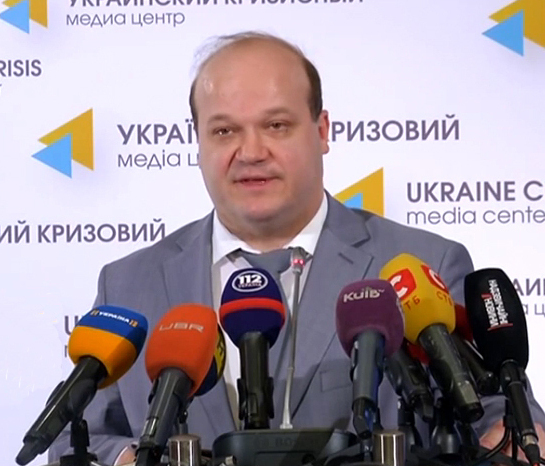
- Chaly in 2014

Ambassador of Ukraine to the United States
- In office July 10, 2015 – July 19, 2019
- President: Petro Poroshenko; Volodymyr Zelenskyy
- Prime Minister: Arseniy Yatsenyuk
- Preceded by: Yaroslav Brisiuck
- Succeeded by: Volodymyr Yelchenko

Personal details
- Born: 1 July 1970 (age 56) Vinnytsia, Soviet Union
- Education: Vinnytsia State Pedagogical University
- Profession: historian

Valeriy Oleksiiovych Chaly (Ukrainian: Валерій Олексійович Чалий; born July 1, 1970) is a Ukrainian diplomat. He was the Ambassador of Ukraine to the United States from 2015 to 2019.

== Education ==
Valeriy Chaly graduated from Vinnytsia State Pedagogical University, historical faculty (1992); Taras Shevchenko National University of Kyiv, Institute of international relations, faculty of international law, postgraduate course (1995).

== Career ==
From 1995 to 1997, he worked as a senior consultant, helper and reviewer Group to the President of Ukraine. From 1997 to 1999, he was the helper of deputy secretary of National Security and Defense Council of Ukraine.

From 2000 to 2006, he was an independent consultant in Committee on foreign affairs Verkhovna Rada of Ukraine. From 2006 to 2009, he was Deputy General Director of International Programs. From 2009 to 2010, he was the deputy Minister of Ukrainian foreign affairs.

From 2010 to 2014, he was deputy General Director of Ukraine. From 2014 to 2015, he was deputy head of the Presidential Administration of Ukraine. From July 10, 2015, to July 19, 2019, he was the ambassador of Ukraine to the United States.

On November 1, 2018, by a resolution of the Government of the Russian Federation, he was included in the list of Ukrainian citizens against whom Russian sanctions were imposed.

On October 14, 2019, in an interview with the publication “Livy Bereg,” he announced that he had resigned from public service at the Ministry of Foreign Affairs of Ukraine.

== Diplomatic rank ==
He holds the diplomatic rank of extraordinary and plenipotentiary ambassador (2014).

== See also ==
- Embassy of Ukraine, Washington, D.C.
