= Embassy of Ukraine, Paris =

Coordinates: 48°50′56″N 2°18′34″E

Embassy of Ukraine in Paris
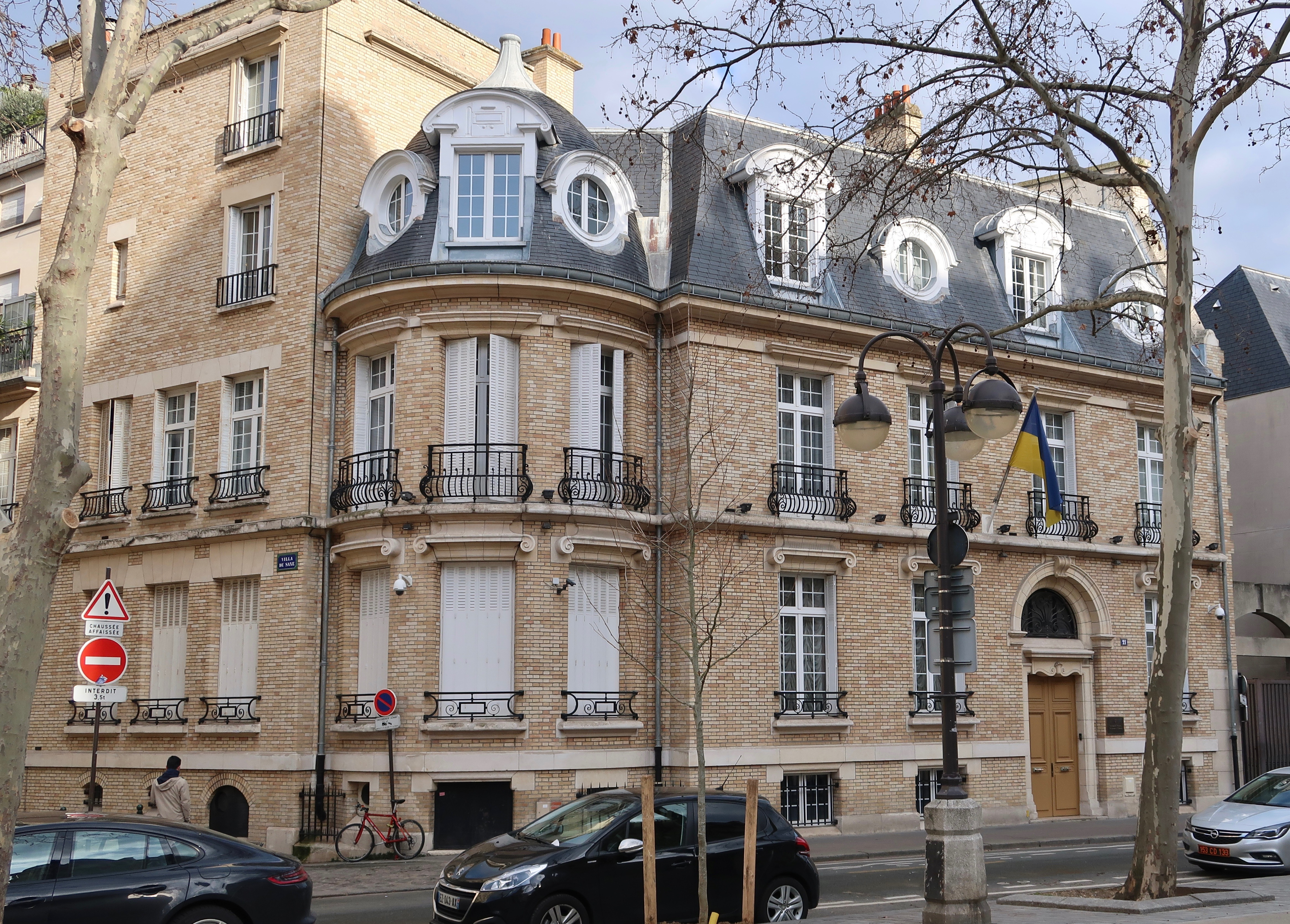
- Location: Paris
- Address: 21 avenue de Saxe Paris
- Ambassador: Oleh Shamshur

The Embassy of Ukraine in Paris is the diplomatic mission of Ukraine in France.

== History ==
France recognised the independence of Ukraine on December 27, 1991. Diplomatic relations were established on January 24, 1992. Following independence, Ukraine opened its embassy in Paris in 1993.

== Consulates ==
Besides the Consulate of the Paris embassy, Ukraine has a consulate in Marseille and honorary consulates in Metz, Lyon, Nevers and Toulouse.

== List of ambassadors ==
- 1992 Oleksandr Slipchenko, Chargé d'Affaires ad interim
- 1992–1997 Yuri Kochubey, Ambassador
- 1997–2000 Anatoliy Zlenko, Ambassador
- 2000–2003 Vitaly Yohna, Chargé d'Affaires ad interim
- 2003–2007 Yuriy A. Sergeyev, Ambassador
- 2007–2010 Kostiantyn Tymochenko, Ambassador
- 2010–2014 Oleksandr Kupchyshyn, Ambassador
- 2014—2020 Oleh Shamshur, Ambassador
- since 2020 Vadim Omelchenko, Ambassador

== See also ==
- France–Ukraine relations
- Foreign relations of France
- Foreign relations of Ukraine
- Embassy of France, Kyiv
- Diplomatic missions of Ukraine
