= Embassy of France, Kyiv =

Embassy of France in Kyiv
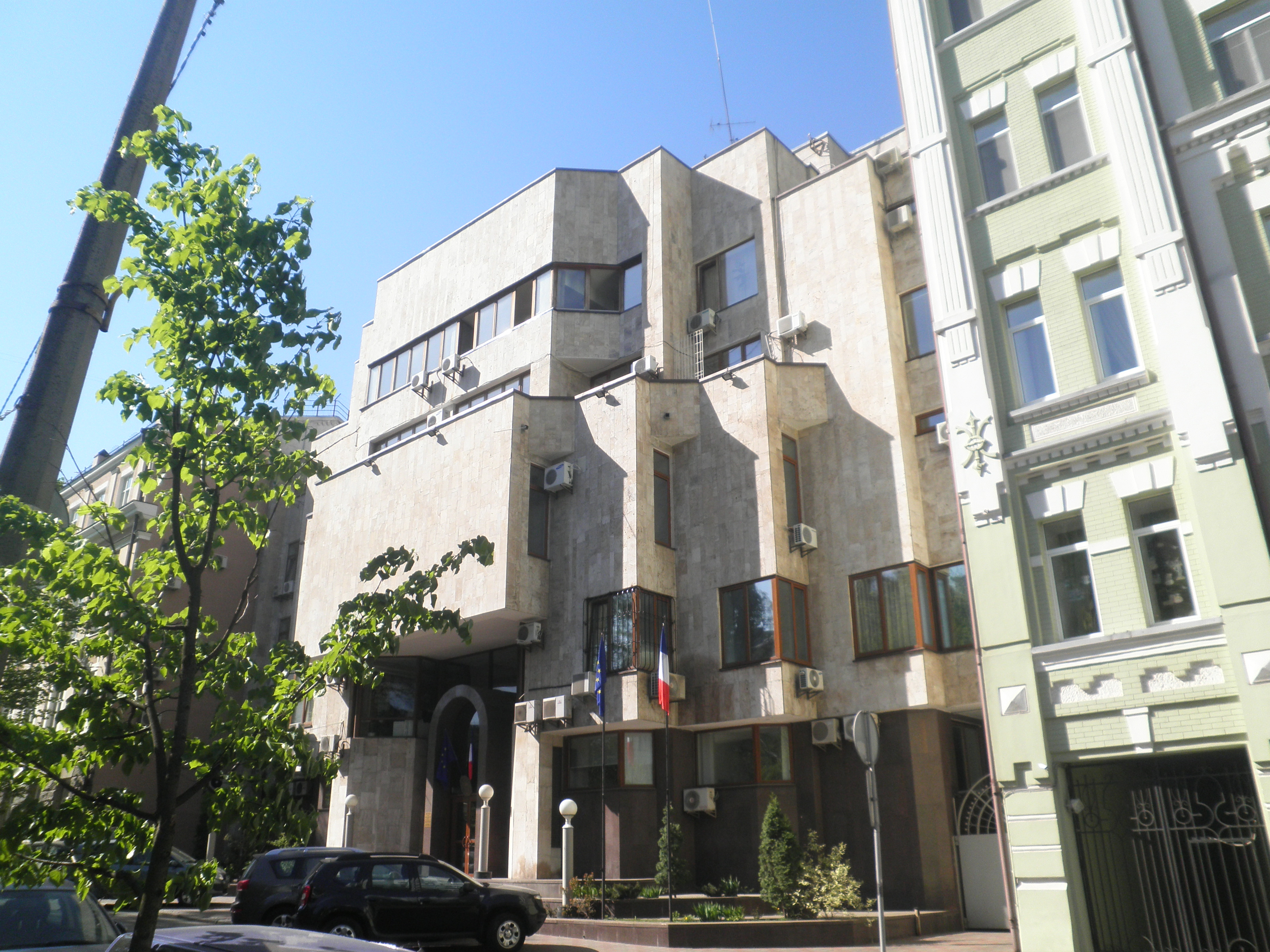
- Location: Kyiv
- Address: 39, Reitarska str 01901 Kyiv, Ukraine
- Coordinates: 50°27′14″N 30°30′29″E
- Ambassador: Gaël Veyssière

The Embassy of France in Kyiv is the diplomatic mission of France in Ukraine.

== History ==
France recognised the independence of Ukraine on December 27, 1991. Diplomatic relations were established on January 24, 1992. During the 2022 Russian Invasion of Ukraine, the embassy was relocated to Lviv on 28 February 2022 and returned to Kyiv on 15 April 2022.

== List of Ambassadors ==
- 1992 - 1993: Hugues Pernet
- 1993 - 1995: Michel Peissik
- 1995 - 1997: Dominique Chassard
- 1997 - 2001: Pascal Fieschi
- 2002 - 2005: Philippe de Suremain
- 2005 - 2008: Jean-Paul Véziant
- 2008 - 2011: Jacques Faure
- 2011 - 2015: Alain Rémy
- 2015 - 2019: Isabelle Dumont
- 2019 - 2023: Etienne de Poncins
- 2023 - present: Gaël Veyssière

== See also ==
- France–Ukraine relations
- Foreign relations of France
- Foreign relations of Ukraine
- Embassy of Ukraine, Paris
- Diplomatic missions in Ukraine
