= Oleksandr Motsyk =

Ukrainian diplomat

Olexander Motsyk
- Олександр Моцик
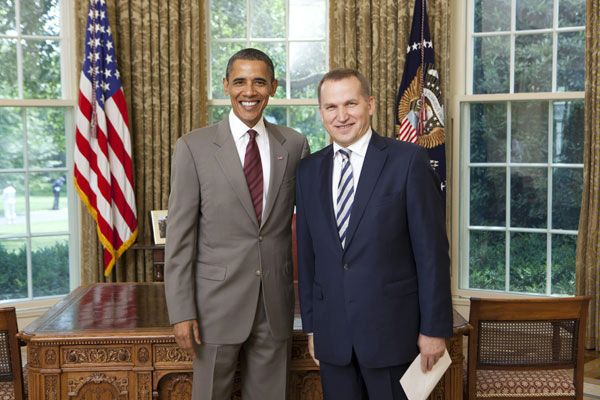
- President Barack Obama welcomes Ambassador Olexander Motsyk of Ukraine

Ambassador of Ukraine to the United States
- In office 2010–2015
- President: Viktor Yushchenko; Viktor Yanukovych; Oleksandr Turchynov; Petro Poroshenko
- Preceded by: Oleh Shamshur
- Succeeded by: Yaroslav Brisiuck

Ambassador of Ukraine to Poland
- In office 2005–2010
- President: Viktor Yushchenko
- Preceded by: Ihor Kharchenko
- Succeeded by: Markiyan Malskyy

Ambassador of Ukraine to Turkey
- In office 1997–2001
- President: Leonid Kuchma
- Preceded by: Oleksiy Chevkoplyas
- Succeeded by: Ihor Dolhov

Personal details
- Born: 3 May 1955 (age 71) Vladimiretskiy Raion, Rovno Oblast, Ukrainian SSR, Soviet Union
- Party: Soviet Communist (until 1991)
- Education: Kyiv University
- Occupation: Jurist

Olexander Motsyk (born 3 May 1955) is a Ukrainian diplomat. Ambassador Extraordinary and Plenipotentiary (1999).

== Education ==
- Taras Shevchenko National University of Kyiv, School of International Relations, Department of International Law (summa cum laude, 1981). Languages: English, Russian, Polish

== Career ==
07.1981-05.1985 — Third secretary, Consular Department, Ministry of Foreign Affairs of Ukraine

05.1985-04.1987 — Third, Second Secretary, Department of International Organizations, Ministry of Foreign Affairs of Ukraine

04.1987-09.1990 — Second, First secretary, HR Department, Ministry of Foreign Affairs of Ukraine

09.1990-04.1992 — First secretary, Directorate General for Treaties and Legal Affairs, Ministry of Foreign Affairs of Ukraine

04.1992-08.1995 — Second, First Secretary, Counselor, Permanent Mission of Ukraine to the UN, New York City

08.1995-11.1997 — Director General, Directorate General for Treaties and Legal Affairs, Ministry of Foreign Affairs of Ukraine

11.1997-11.2001 — Ambassador Extraordinary and Plenipotentiary of Ukraine to the Republic of Turkey

11.2001-07.2003 — Deputy State Secretary, Ministry of Foreign Affairs of Ukraine

07.2003-07.2004 — Deputy Minister, Ministry of Foreign Affairs of Ukraine

07.2004-02.2005 — First Deputy Minister for European Integration, Ministry of Foreign Affairs of Ukraine

02.2005-12.2005 — First Deputy State Secretary, First Deputy Head, Secretariat of President of Ukraine

01.2006–06.2010— Ambassador Extraordinary and Plenipotentiary of Ukraine to the Republic of Poland

06.2010-04.2015 — Ambassador Extraordinary and Plenipotentiary of Ukraine to the United States of America

11.2010-04.2015 — Ambassador Extraordinary and Plenipotentiary of Ukraine to Antigua and Barbuda with Residence in the U.S.

07.2011-04.2015 — Permanent Observer of Ukraine at the Organization of American States

09.2011-04.2015 — Ambassador Extraordinary and Plenipotentiary of Ukraine to the Republic of Trinidad and Tobago with Residence in the U.S.

== Professional activity ==
1993 — Reporter of the Sixth Committee (Legal Committee), 48th Session of the U.N. General Assembly

1994-1995 — Vice-Chairperson of the U.N. Ad Hoc Committee on the Elaboration of an International Convention Dealing with the Safety and Security of the United Nations and Associated Personnel

1995-2005 — Headed a number of Ukrainian delegations on bilateral and multilateral negotiations, and international forums.

2002-2005 — National Coordinator of Organization of the Black Sea Economic Cooperation (BSEC)

2004 — Agent of Ukraine before the International Court of Justice in the case concerning Maritime Delimitation in the Black Sea (Romania v. Ukraine)

2004-2005 — National Coordinator of GUAM (Regional economic organization of Georgia, Ukraine, Azerbaijan, and Moldova)

== Author publications ==
Author of numerous essays and articles in the field of International Law and International Relations. The main topics are: succession of States in respect of State property, archives and debts; the Maritime Law; BSEC; GUAM; bilateral Ukrainian-Turkish, Ukrainian-Polish and Ukrainian-American relations.

== Honorary awards ==
- The Order of Merit, III Degree (2001)
- Honorary Award, I Degree of the Ministry of Foreign Affairs of Ukraine for individual contribution to the development of Ukrainian diplomatic service and successful protection of Ukrainian interests on international arena. (2004).
- The Order of Justice, I Degree of the World Jurist Association (2005)
- The Order of Merit, II Degree (2006)
- Commander Cross and Star of the Order of Merit of the Republic of Poland (Krzyż Komandorski z Gwiazdą Orderu Zasługi RP) (2010)
