= Sergiy Korsunsky =

Ukrainian diplomat

- Сергій Корсунський
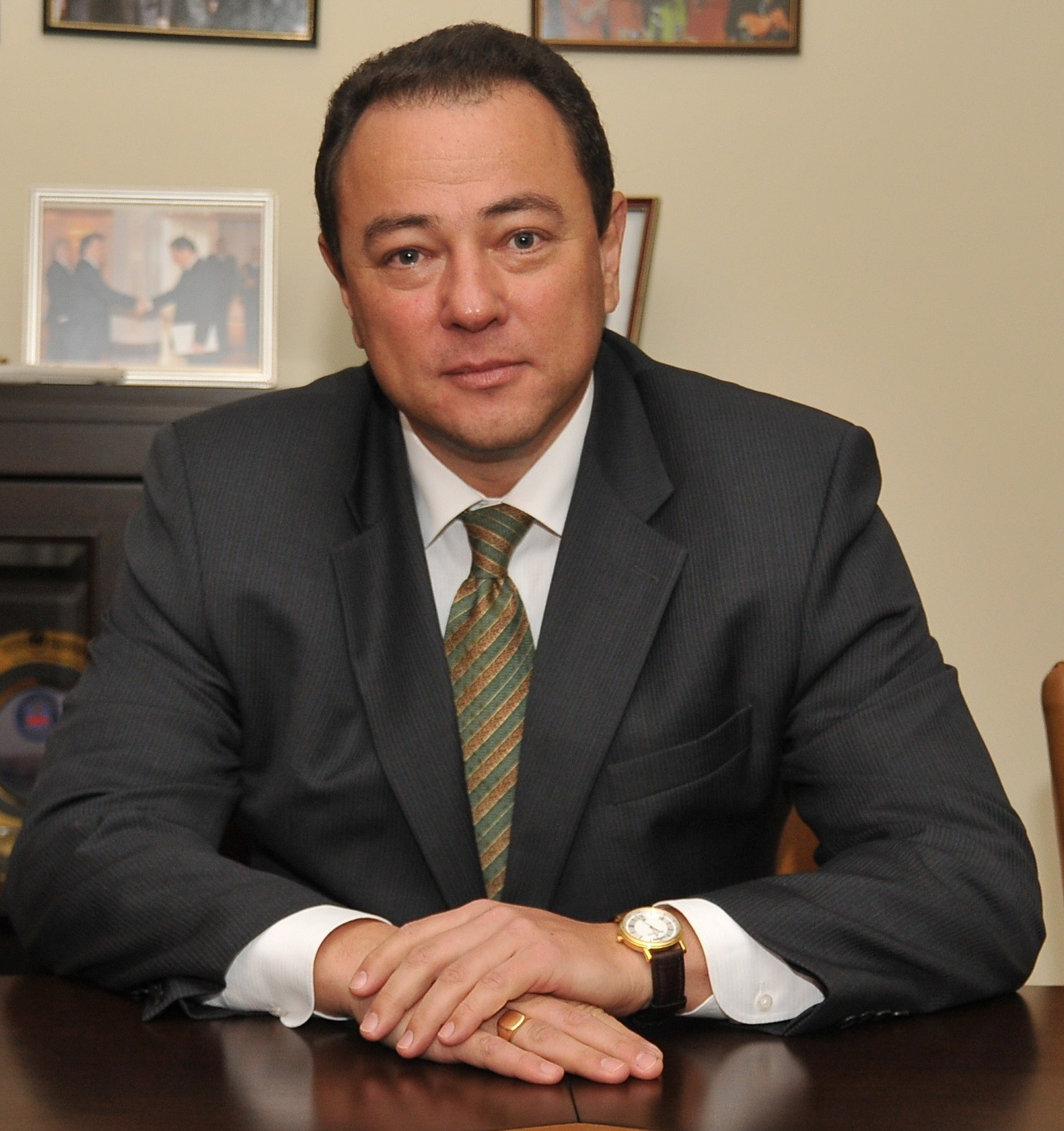

Ambassador of Ukraine to Japan
- In office 2020–2024
- Preceded by: Ihor Kharchenko
- Succeeded by: Yuriy Lutovinov

Head of the Diplomatic Academy of Ukraine at the Ministry of Foreign Affairs of Ukraine
- In office 2017–2020
- Preceded by: Tsivatyi Viacheslav
- Succeeded by: Nadolenko Gennadiy

Ambassador of Ukraine to Turkey
- In office 2008–2016
- Prime Minister: Arseniy Yatsenyuk
- Preceded by: Oleksandr Mishchenko
- Succeeded by: Andrii Sybiha

Chargé d'Affaires of Ukraine to the United States
- In office 2005–2005
- President: Viktor Yushchenko
- Preceded by: Mykhailo Reznik
- Succeeded by: Oleh Shamshur
- President: Petro Poroshenko

Personal details
- Born: 10 August 1962 (age 64) Kyiv, Ukrainian SSR, Soviet Union
- Education: Kyiv University
- Profession: Physicist and mathematician

Sergiy Korsunsky (born August 10, 1962) is a Ukrainian diplomat. He previously served as Chargé d'affaires of Ukraine to the United States during 2005 and Ambassador Extraordinary and Plenipotentiary of Ukraine to Turkey (2008-2016). Director of the Hennadii Udovenko Diplomatic Academy of Ukraine in 2017-2020.

He was ambassador of Ukraine to Japan from April 2020 to December 2024.

== Education ==
Sergiy Korsunsky graduated from Taras Shevchenko National University of Kyiv in 1984, faculty for Mathematics and Mechanics. Doctor of Science (Physics and Mathematics).

In 1995, he undertook a professional training course at the Institute for International Relations, Kyiv State University.

== Career ==
1984 — 1988 — Researcher with the National Academy of Sciences of Ukraine. 1988 — 1991 — Researcher-Consultant, Presidium of the National Academy of Sciences of Ukraine 1991 — 1994 — Director-General of the Department for State Scientific and Technological Programs at the State Committee on Science and Technologies of Ukraine 1994 — 1995 — Secretary of the first class of the Ukraine’s National Commission for UNESCO 1995 — 1998 — Counsellor for Economy, Science and Technologies, Embassy of Ukraine to the State of Israel 1998 — 2000 — Deputy Head of the Department for Economic Cooperation of the Ministry of Foreign Affairs of Ukraine 2000 — 2006 — Counsellor, Minister Counsellor of the Embassy of Ukraine, Washington, D.C., in 2005 charge d'affaires a.i. of Ukraine to the United States. 2006 — 2008 — Head of the Department for Economic Cooperation, Ministry of Foreign Affairs of Ukraine July 2008 — up to June 18, 2016 — Ambassador Extraordinary and Plenipotentiary of Ukraine to the Republic of Turkey October 2017 – April 2020 - Director, Hennadii Udovenko Diplomatic Academy of Ukraine April 14, 2020 - December 21, 2024 - Ambassador Extraordinary and Plenipotentiary of Ukraine to Japan

=== 2024 Yasukuni Shrine visit ===
On 3 September 2024, while serving as Ukraine's ambassador to Japan, Korsunsky visited Yasukuni Shrine in Tokyo. The Ukrainian embassy in Japan posted photographs of the visit on X and stated that Korsunsky had visited the shrine to mourn those who had died for their country; the post was deleted the following day. Yasukuni Shrine commemorates Japan's war dead and enshrines 14 Class-A war criminals. The visit drew criticism in both China and South Korea, including on social media.

== Academic affiliations ==
Visiting professor Kobe Gakuin University, Japan

Honorary professor Borys Grinchenko Kyiv University, Ukraine

== Author publications ==
Author of more than 350 academic papers and other publications including 8 books, among them "Nonlinear waves in dispersive and dissipative systems with coupled fields" (Addison, Wesley. Longman, 1997), “Technology Transfer in the United States” (Kyiv, 2005), “Energy Diplomacy” (Kyiv, 2008), "Foreign Policy in Times of Transformations: how not to be left on the sidelines of history" (Kharkiv, 2020), How to build relations with Asian countries: economy, diplomacy, cultural peculiarities (Kharkiv, 2021), How nations reborn: experience of East Asia (Kharkiv, 2023).

Author of 10 books of fiction published in 2010-2019 under the pen-name Sergey Vladich (in Russian), as hobby
