= Oleh Bilorus =

Ukrainian politician (1939–2026)

- Олег Білорус
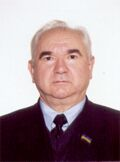
- Bilorus in 2006

Ambassador of Ukraine to the United States
- In office 1992–1994
- President: Leonid Kravchuk
- Preceded by: Sergiy V. Kulyk
- Succeeded by: Yuriy Shcherbak

Personal details
- Born: Oleh Hryhoryovych Bilorus; 14 October 1939 Chervone, Fastiv Raion, Kyiv Oblast, Ukrainian SSR, Soviet Union
- Died: 7 November 2026 (aged 87)
- Party: Batkivshchyna
- Other political affiliations: Hromada
- Education: Kyiv Institute of National Economy

Oleh Hryhoryovych Bilorus (Ukrainian: Олег Григорович Білорус; 14 October 1939 – 7 November 2026) was a Ukrainian politician and academic. He was a member of National Academy of Sciences of Ukraine (NASU), from May 1990.

== Life and career ==
=== Background ===
Bilorus was born on 14 October 1939 in Сhervone village, Fastiv Raion, Kyiv Oblast to a family of teachers. His wife Larisa (born 1945) is a retired linguistics schoolteacher. Bilorus had two children, his son Igor (born 1967) is an economist, daughter Irina (born 1969) is a philologist, has a PhD in law.

Bilorus died on 7 November 2026, at the age of 86.

=== Education ===
In 1960, Bilorus graduated from the Economics and Industrial Management faculty, Kyiv Institute of National Economy (with the engineer-economist specialization). He received his PhD with the thesis "The Problems of Combining the Industrial Production Processes" (1966), and doctorate thesis "Problems of Economics, Associations and Complexes (theory and methodology)"(1980). He also held research internships:

- 1964–1966 at the University of Belgrade (Yugoslavia)
- 1974–1976 at Harvard University and Columbia University (United States).

Bilorus spoke English, Serbian, French, Croatian, Polish as well as German languages in addition to his native Ukrainian.

He was the author (or coauthor) of more than 500 scientific papers, including 27 individual and collective monographs and textbooks.

=== Career ===
- 1960–1962 – engineer-economist, deputy head, head of planning and economic department of scientific production association (NPO) named after T. Shevchenko in Kharkiv
- 1962–1966 – post-graduate student at the Kyiv Institute of National Economy
- 1964–1965 – research fellow at the University of Belgrade (Yugoslavia)
- 1966–1979 – assistant, senior research fellow, senior lecturer, associate dean, dean, rector of the Kyiv Institute of National Economy
- 1970–1979 – 1st vice-rector of the Kyiv Institute of National Economy
- 1974–1975 – research fellow at Harvard University and Columbia University (USA)
- 1979–1986 – director of the Department of Industry, Science and Technology at the UN Secretariat in Geneva
- 1986–1989 – deputy director of the Institute of Economics of USSR Planning Committee (Kyiv)
- 1989–1990 – deputy director, head of Department, Institute of Economics of the Academy of Sciences of Ukraine
- 1989–1992 – CEO (and founder) of the International Management Institute in Kyiv, the Director of Institute of the World Economy and International Relations affiliated with Academy of Sciences of Ukraine (since 1990)
- 1992–1994 – Ambassador of Ukraine to the United States
- 1996–1997 – advisor to the Prime Minister of Ukraine Pavel Lazarenko. Member of "Lazarenko" All-Ukrainian Association "Hromada", presidium member and deputy chairman of the party (1996–1999)
- 1998–2002 – People's Deputy of Ukraine in the 3rd Verkhovna Rada from "Hromada"

=== Political career ===
- March 1998 – April 2002 – People's Deputy of the 3rd Verkhovna Rada of Ukraine, from "Hromada", No. 8 in the list
- April 2002 – May 2006 – People's Deputy of the 4th Verkhovna Rada, from the Yulia Tymoshenko Bloc (BYuT), No. 4 in the list
- May 2002 – February 2005 – Deputy Chairman of BYuT, since February 2005 – Chairman of the BYuT fraction
- May 2006 – June 2007 – People's Deputy of the 5th Verkhovna Rada, elected from the Yulia Tymoshenko Bloc, No. 11 in the list

Bilorus was re-elected into parliament for BYuT during the 2007 Ukrainian parliamentary election.

He was placed at number 122 on the electoral list of Batkivshchina during the 2012 Ukrainian parliamentary election. He was not re-elected into parliament.

== Awards and titles ==
- Honored Worker of Science and Technology of Ukraine
- Doctor of Economics
- A Diplomat of the Year (United States, 1994)
- Awardee of Schlichter prize, Academy of Sciences of Ukraine (1989), and of M.Ptukha prize, (2000)
- 1972, 1976 – Excellence distinction of higher education of the USSR
- 1999 – Colonel-General of Zaporizhzhya Cossacks
- 1970 – Honorary Hunter of Ukraine
- 1970 – Medal "For Valorous Work"
- 2005 – Diploma of the Verkhovna Rada of Ukraine
- 2009 – Order of Prince Yaroslav the Wise fifth class

Diplomatic rank – Ambassador Extraordinary and Plenipotentiary of Ukraine (March 1992).
