= Embassy of Kenya in France =

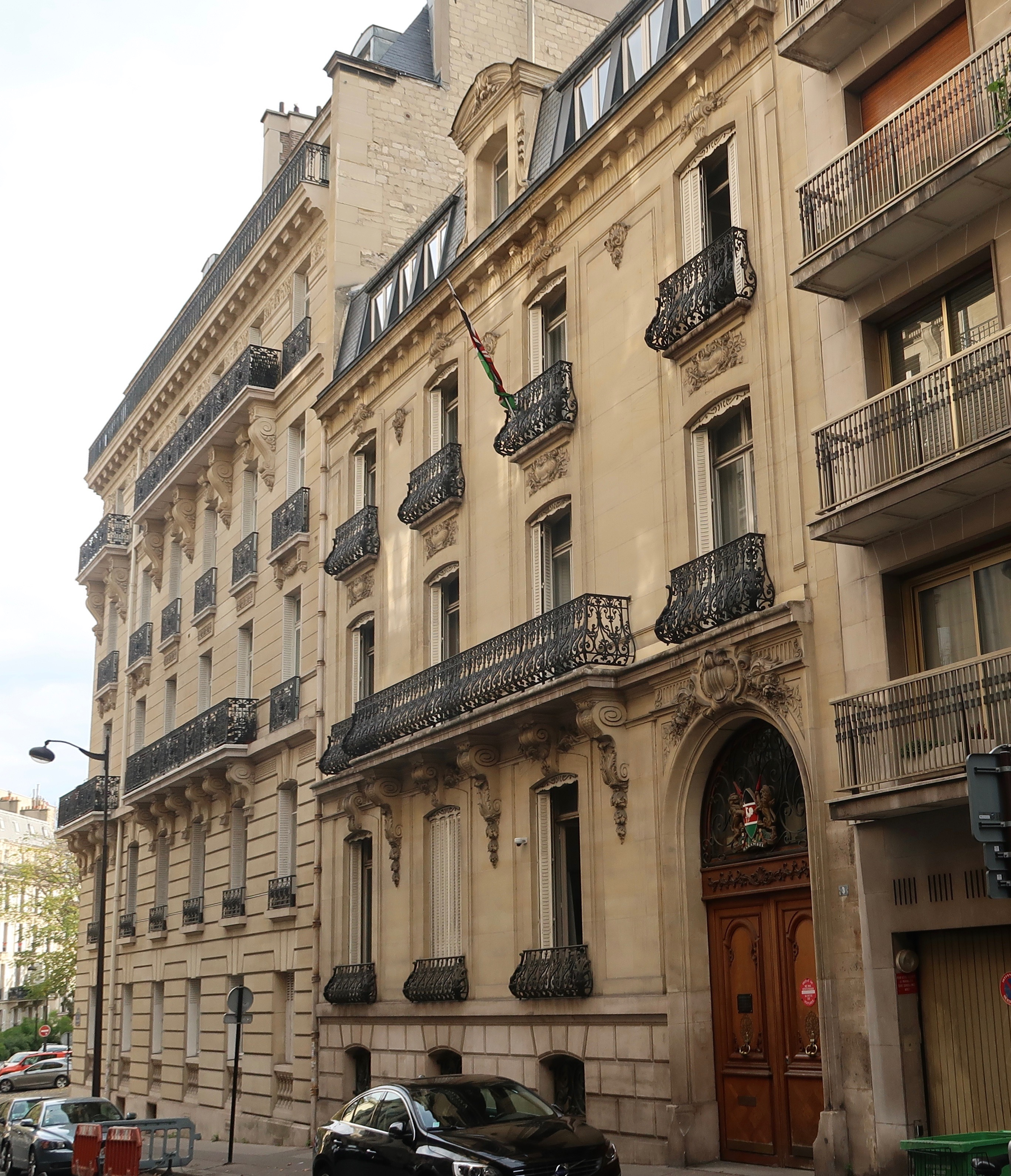
- Location: Paris
- Address: 3 Freycinet Street, 16th arrondissement
- Coordinates: 48.865556°N 2.298333°E
- Ambassador: Betty Chebet Cherwon
- Website: kenyaembassyparis.fr

The embassy of Kenya in France is the diplomatic mission of Kenya to France. It is located in Paris and its ambassador since 2024 is Betty Chebet Cherwon.

== Embassy ==
The embassy is located on Freycinet Street in the 16th arrondissement of Paris.

== Ambassadors of Kenya to France ==
Date of nomination	Sending date of letters of credence	Ambassador
	17 November 1992	Dan J.N. Karobia
	21 March 1996	Steven Arphaxard K.A. Loyatum
	12 September 2000	Boaz Kidiga Mbaya
	10 February 2004	Raychelle Omamo
	2 July 2009	Elkanah Odembo
	3 December 2010	Salma Ahmed
2018	4 March 2019	Judi Wangalwa Wakhungu
2023		Mildred Ming'ala (chargé d'affaires)
October 2023	17 September 2024	Betty Chebet Cherwon

== See also ==
- Ministry of Foreign Affairs (Kenya)
- Embassy of France in Kenya
- France–Kenya relations
