= Andrii Yanevskyi =

Ukrainian diplomat

- Андрій Яневський
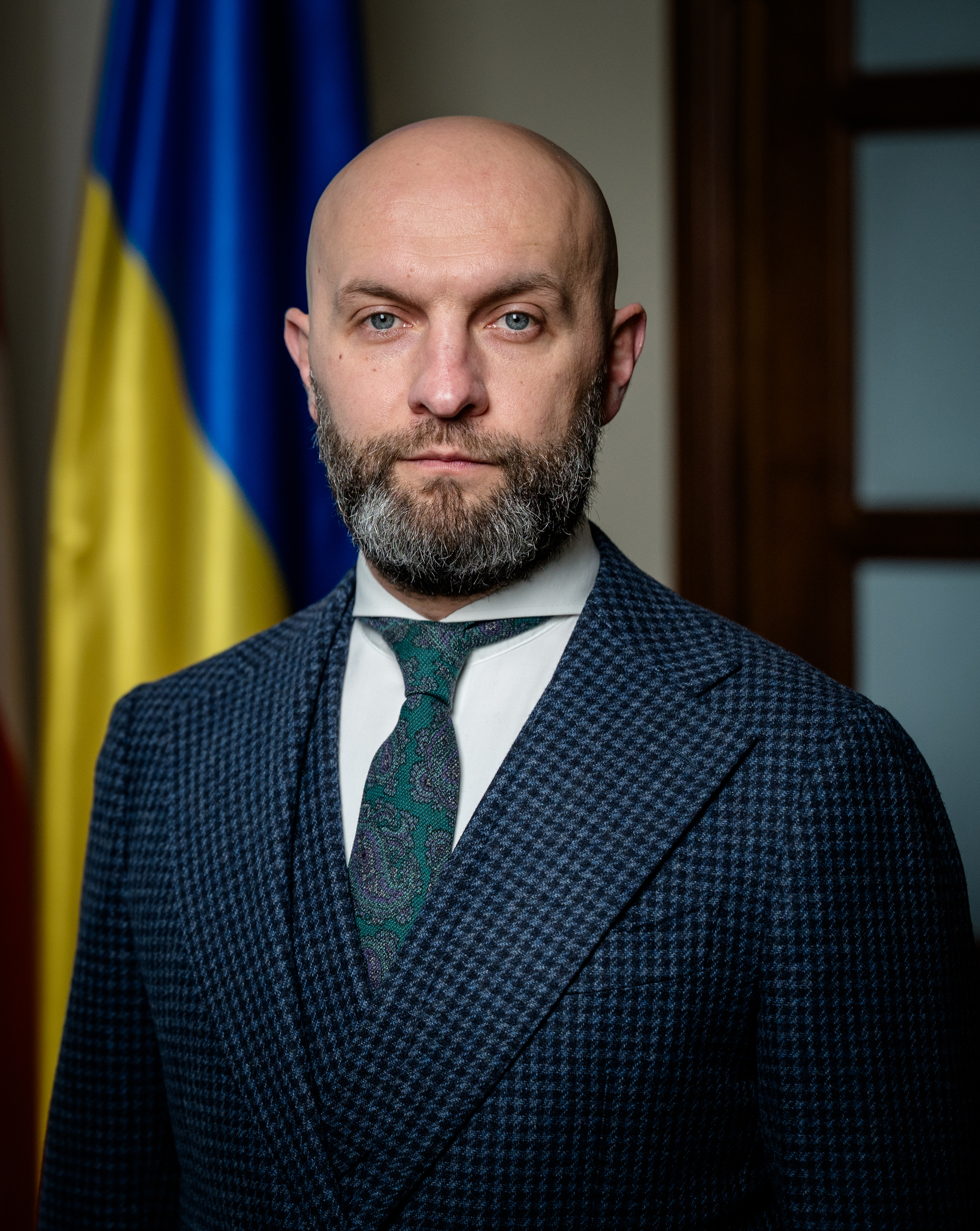

Ambassador Extraordinary and Plenipotentiary of Ukraine to the Kingdom of Denmark
- Incumbent
- Assumed office 27 October 2023
- Preceded by: Mykhailo Vydoynyk

Personal details
- Born: Andrii Serhiiovych Yanevskyi; 11 December 1986 (age 38); Zvenyhorodka, Cherkasy Oblast, Soviet Union (now Zvenyhorodka, Ukraine)

Andrii Serhiiovych Yanevskyi (Ukrainian: Андрій Сергійович Яневський; born on 11 December 1986) is a Ukrainian diplomat who has served as the ambassador of Ukraine to Denmark since 27 October 2023. Prior to his appointment as ambassador to Denmark, he had worked at the Ukrainian embassies in Morocco and Lebanon, as Chargé d'Affaires ad interim to the United States, and in multiple positions within the leadership of the Ministry of Foreign Affairs.

During his tenure as the temporary head of the Ukrainian embassy in the U.S., in 2019 he signed an agreement with the Ambassador of the Marshall Islands to the United States Gerald Zackios allowing for visa-free travel between Ukraine and the Marshall Islands.

== See also ==
- Ambassadors of Ukraine
