= Sergiy Kulyk =

Ukrainian diplomat

- Сергій Кулик
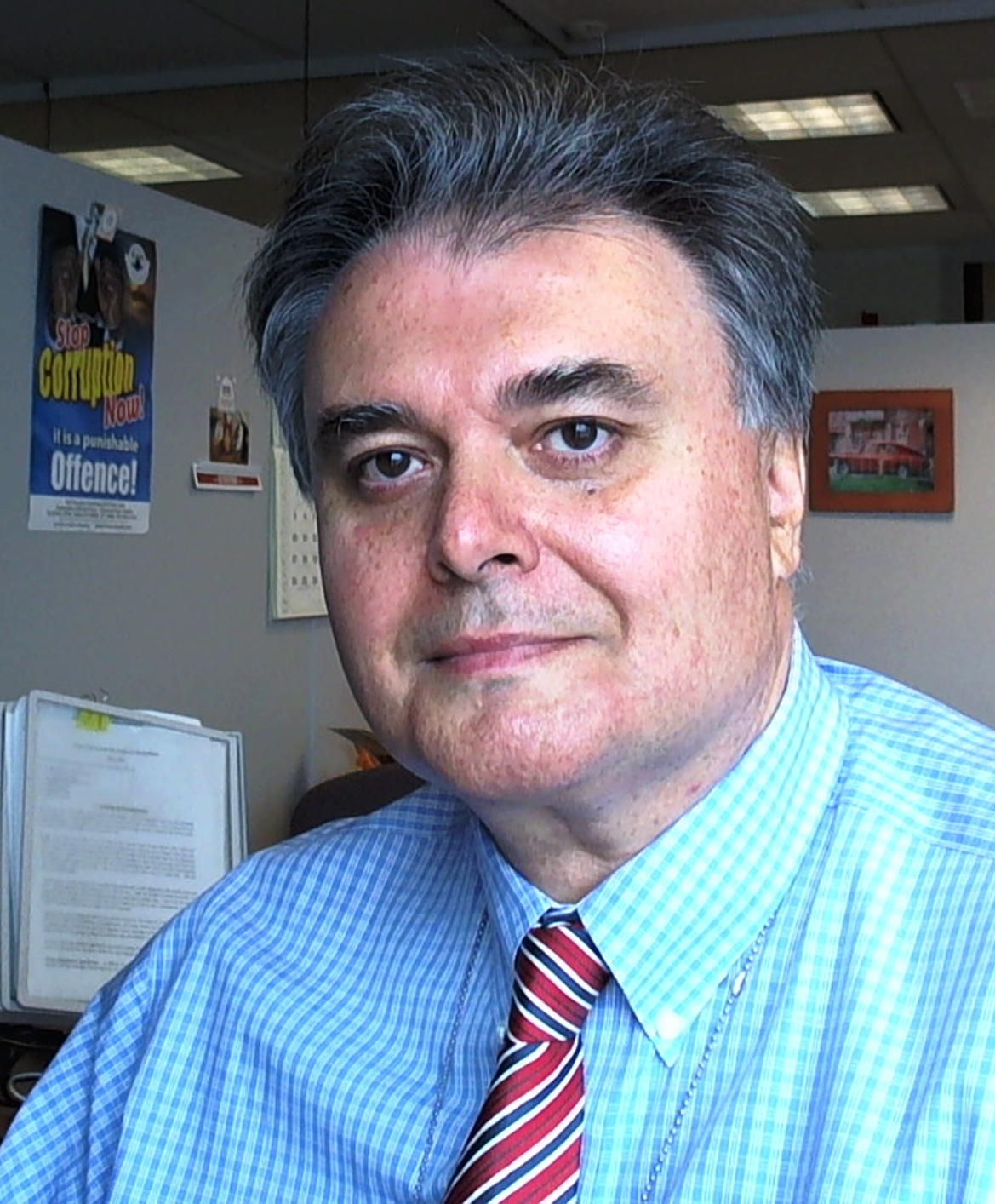
- Kulyk in 2017

Chargé d’affaires of Ukraine to the United States
- In office 01.1992–12.1992
- President: Leonid Kravchuk
- Prime Minister: Vitold Fokin
- Succeeded by: Oleh Bilorus

Personal details
- Born: 5 August 1958 (age 68) Kiev
- Education: Harvard University
- Profession: diplomat

Sergiy Volodymyrovych Kulyk (Ukrainian: Сергій Володимирович Кулик; born August 5, 1958) is a Ukrainian diplomat. He has held the positions of Chargé d'affaires of Ukraine in the United States (1992) and Coordinator of the World Bank on the African continent as a Country Program Coordinator for Ghana, Liberia, and Sierra Leone, AFC.

== Education ==
Kulyk holds a degree in International Economics. In 2001, he completed the Executive Development Program at Harvard University.

== Career ==
In 1982 he worked as second secretary of the Ministry of Foreign Affairs of the Ukrainian SSR, was an expert delegation on Ukrainian SSR XXXVII General Assembly of the United Nations.

He worked as first secretary of the Permanent Mission of Ukraine to the UN.

From 01.1992 to 12.1992 – Chargé d'affaires of Ukraine in the United States.

Since 1993 he joined the World Bank. He worked positions in the Europe and Central Asia department as a Resident Representative in Belarus, Moldova and Ukraine, the Lead Country Officer and Country Program Coordinator.

Since 2009 he works as Coordinator of the World Bank on the African continent as a Country Program Coordinator for countries Ghana, Liberia and Sierra Leone.

== See also ==
- Embassy of Ukraine, Washington, D.C.
