= Yevhen Holitsynsky =

Ukrainian diplomat

- Євген Голіцинський
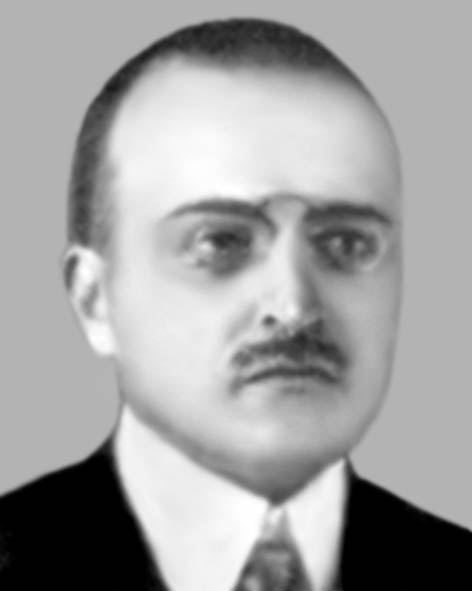

The head of the diplomatic mission of Ukraine to the United States
- In office 1918–1919
- President: Mykhailo Hrushevskyi

Personal details
- Born: 1878 Chișinău
- Died: 1932 (aged 53–54)
- Education: Kyiv Polytechnic Institute

Yevhen Mykolaiovych Holitsynsky (birth: 1878, Chișinău – † 1932, Poděbrady) was a Ukrainian diplomat. In 1918 he attempted to implement his idea of an independent Ukraine and went to Washington, D.C. to obtain the US government's recognition of the Ukrainian People's Republic.

== Education ==
Yevhen Holitsynsky in 1898 he graduated from Kyiv Cadet Corps. He studied at the Moscow Higher Technical School and at the Kyiv Polytechnic Institute, Faculty of chemistry. In 1907 he graduated from the Prague School.

== Career ==
From 1900 – engaged in revolutionary activities, was one of the founders of the Revolutionary Ukrainian Party and active in Kiev organization "Free the community."

From 1902 – elected member of the Central Committee of the Revolutionary Ukrainian Party

1903–04 – worked at the host committee of the Revolutionary Ukrainian Party

In 1904 – came from the ranks of the Revolutionary Ukrainian Party

1907–15 – worked as a chemical engineer in Kyiv.

1915–17 – was connected to the Union of Liberation, the Lviv Ukraine and Kyiv Ukrainian and foreign public and political organizations.

In 1917 – served as Commissioner in Zvenyhorodschyny.

From 1917 – worked in the Kyiv office of the state bank.

In 1918 – headed the delegation of Ukrainian People's Republic in Germany, the crucial issue of Ukrainian printing money.

1918–19 – headed the diplomatic mission of the Ukrainian People's Republic in the US.

In 1919 – led the diplomatic mission of the Ukrainian People's Republic in Estonia and Latvia.

Since 1920 – worked in Czechoslovakia as an associate professor, professor of chemistry at the Ukrainian Academy in economic Poděbrady.
