= Oleksandriiske =

Rural locality in Kirovohrad Oblast, Ukraine

Oleksandriiske Олександрійське
- Rural settlement
- Location within Ukraine Kirovohrad Oblast Location within Ukraine
- Coordinates: 48°36′07″N 32°59′20″E
- Country: Ukraine
- Oblast: Kirovohrad Oblast
- Raion: Oleksandriia Raion
- Hromada: Oleksandriia urban hromada

Population
  - Total: 4,595
- Postal code: 28040

Oleksandriiske (Ukrainian: Олександрійське) is a rural settlement in Oleksandriia Raion, Kirovohrad Oblast, Ukraine. Originally established in 1947 as a coal miners' settlement, in 1949 it was named as Dymytrove (Ukrainian: Димитрове; Russian: Димитрово, Dimitrovo) after the Bulgarian Communist Georgy Dimitrov. It was renamed to Oleksandriiske in 2016 as part of Decommunization in Ukraine. Oleksandriiske belongs to Oleksandriia urban hromada, one of the hromadas of Ukraine. Population: 4,595 (2022 estimate)

== History ==
Until 18 July 2020, Oleksandriiske belonged to Oleksandriia Municipality. The municipality was abolished as an administrative unit in July 2020 as part of the administrative reform of Ukraine, which reduced the number of raions of Kirovohrad Oblast to four. The area of Oleksandriia Municipality was merged into Oleksandriia Raion.

Until 26 January 2024, Oleksandriiske was designated urban-type settlement. On this day, a new law entered into force which abolished this status, and Oleksandriiske became a rural settlement.
