= Oleh Shamshur =

Ukrainian diplomat

- Олег Шамшур
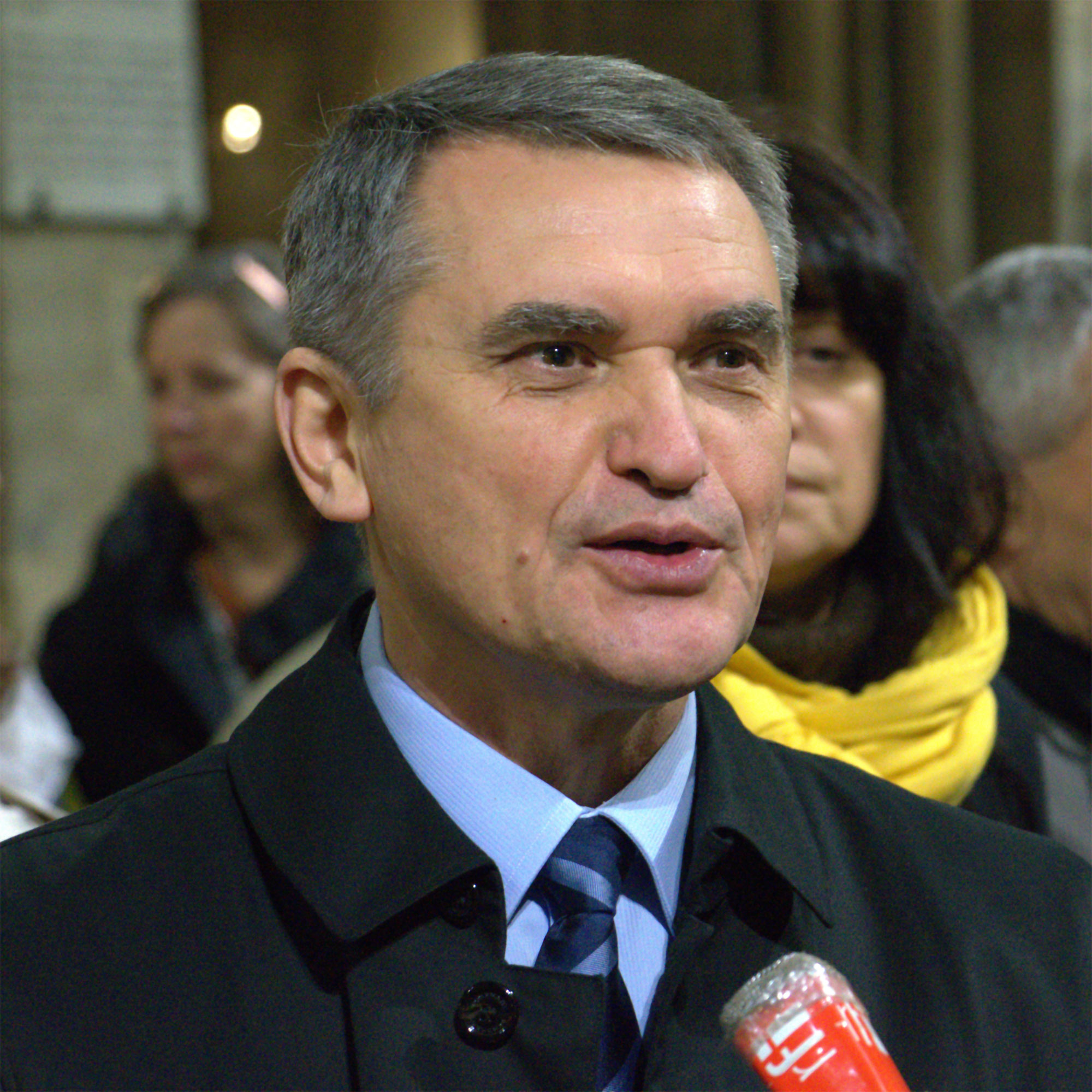
- Shamshur in 2014

Ambassador of Ukraine to France
- In office 2014–2020
- Prime Minister: Arseniy Yatsenyuk
- Preceded by: Oleksandr Kupchyshyn
- President: Petro Poroshenko

Permanent Representative of Ukraine to UNESCO
- In office 2014–2020
- President: Petro Poroshenko
- Preceded by: Olexander Kupchyshyn

Ambassador of Ukraine to the United States
- In office 2005–2010
- President: Viktor Yushchenko
- Preceded by: Sergiy Korsunsky
- Succeeded by: Olexander Motsyk

Personal details
- Born: 6 July 1956 (age 70) Kyiv
- Education: Kiev University
- Profession: historian

Oleh Shamshur (birth: July 6, 1956) is a Ukrainian diplomat. Ambassador of Ukraine to the United States (2005-2010). Ambassador Extraordinary and Plenipotentiary of Ukraine to France (2014-2020). Permanent Representative of Ukraine to UNESCO (2014-2020).

== Education ==
Oleh Shamshur graduated from Taras Shevchenko National University of Kyiv in 1978 specializing in international relations. He received his Ph.D. in History from Kyiv University (1982). Speaks fluently English and French.

== Career ==
Oleh Shamshur in 1978 started his professional career at the Academy of Sciences of Ukraine where he worked at the Institutes of Social and Economic Problems of Foreign Countries and World Economy and International Relations. In 1984-1989 as Director of Programs of ISCPFC. In 1992, he was a researcher at University College London.

Prior to his appointment as Ukraine's Ambassador to France Oleh Shamshur was serving as a Senior Advisor to PBN Hill and Knowlton Strategies, as a non-resident fellow at the German Marshall Fund of the United States and as a Senior Advisor to the U.S.-Ukraine Business Council.

== Author publications ==
Oleh Shamshur is the author of over 80 publications on ethnic relations, international migration and foreign policy.
