= Étienne de Poncins =

Ambassador of France to Poland

His Excellency Etienne de Poncins
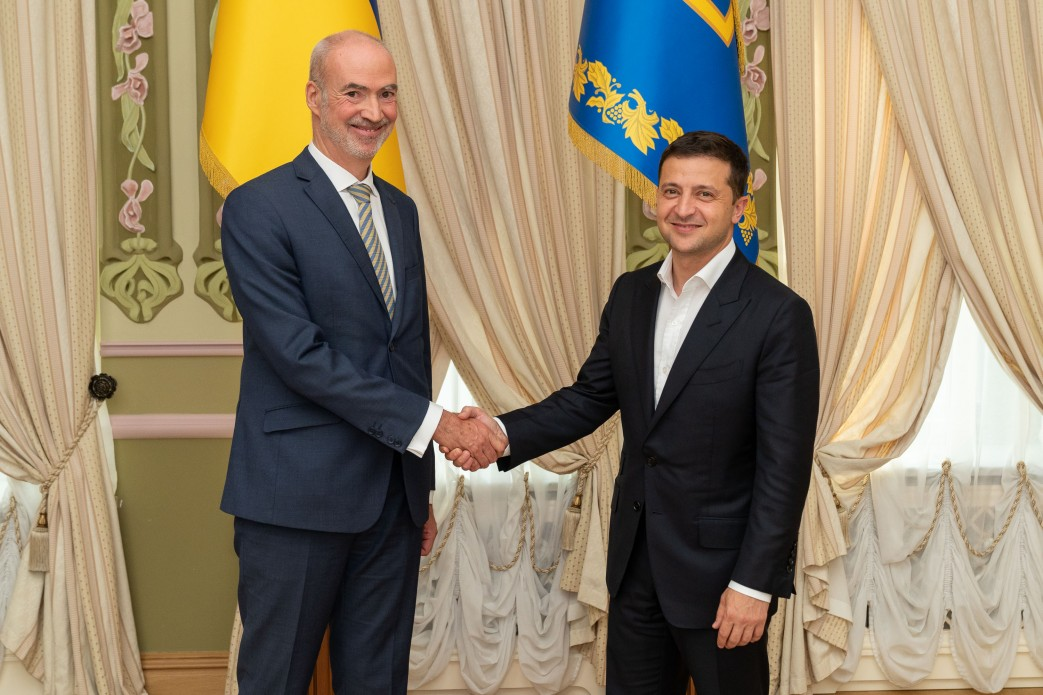
- de Poncins with the President of Ukraine, Volodymyr Zelenskyy

French Ambassador to Poland
- Incumbent
- Assumed office August 2023
- President: Emmanuel Macron
- Preceded by: Frédéric Billet

French Ambassador to Ukraine
- In office September 2019 – August 2023
- President: Emmanuel Macron
- Preceded by: Isabelle Dumont
- Succeeded by: Gaël Veyssière

French Ambassador to Kenya and Somalia
- In office 2010–2013
- President: Nicolas Sarkozy; François Hollande
- Preceded by: Élisabeth Barbier
- Succeeded by: Rémi Maréchaux

French Ambassador to Bulgaria
- In office 2007–2010
- President: Jacques Chirac; Nicolas Sarkozy
- Preceded by: Yves Saint-Geours
- Succeeded by: Philippe Autié

Personal details
- Born: 6 March 1964 (age 62) Suresnes, Hauts-de-Seine, France

Étienne de Poncins (born 6 March 1964) is a French diplomat, serving since August 2023 as the Ambassador of France to Poland.

De Poncins was noted as one of the last-remaining senior diplomats in Ukraine (having re-located to Lviv) amidst the 2022 Russian invasion of Ukraine; engaged in distributing French aid to Ukraine. De Poncins told Politico that "you are here in the difficult moments and hours. I would have felt very bad if I had left." De Poncins returned to Kyiv and re-opened the French embassy in the capital on 15 April.

== Education and career ==
De Poncins graduated from Sciences Po and École nationale d'administration and also has a degree in history from the University of Paris.

He has served in various posting as French Ambassador; firstly to Bulgaria (2007–2010), then to Kenya (2010–2013) and simultaneously Somalia, and to Ukraine (2019-2023).
