= Vinnytsia State Pedagogical University =

Public university in Vinnytsia, Ukraine

Vinnytsia Mykhailo Kotsiubynskyi State Pedagogical University
- Вінницький державний педагогічний університет імені Михайла Коцюбинського
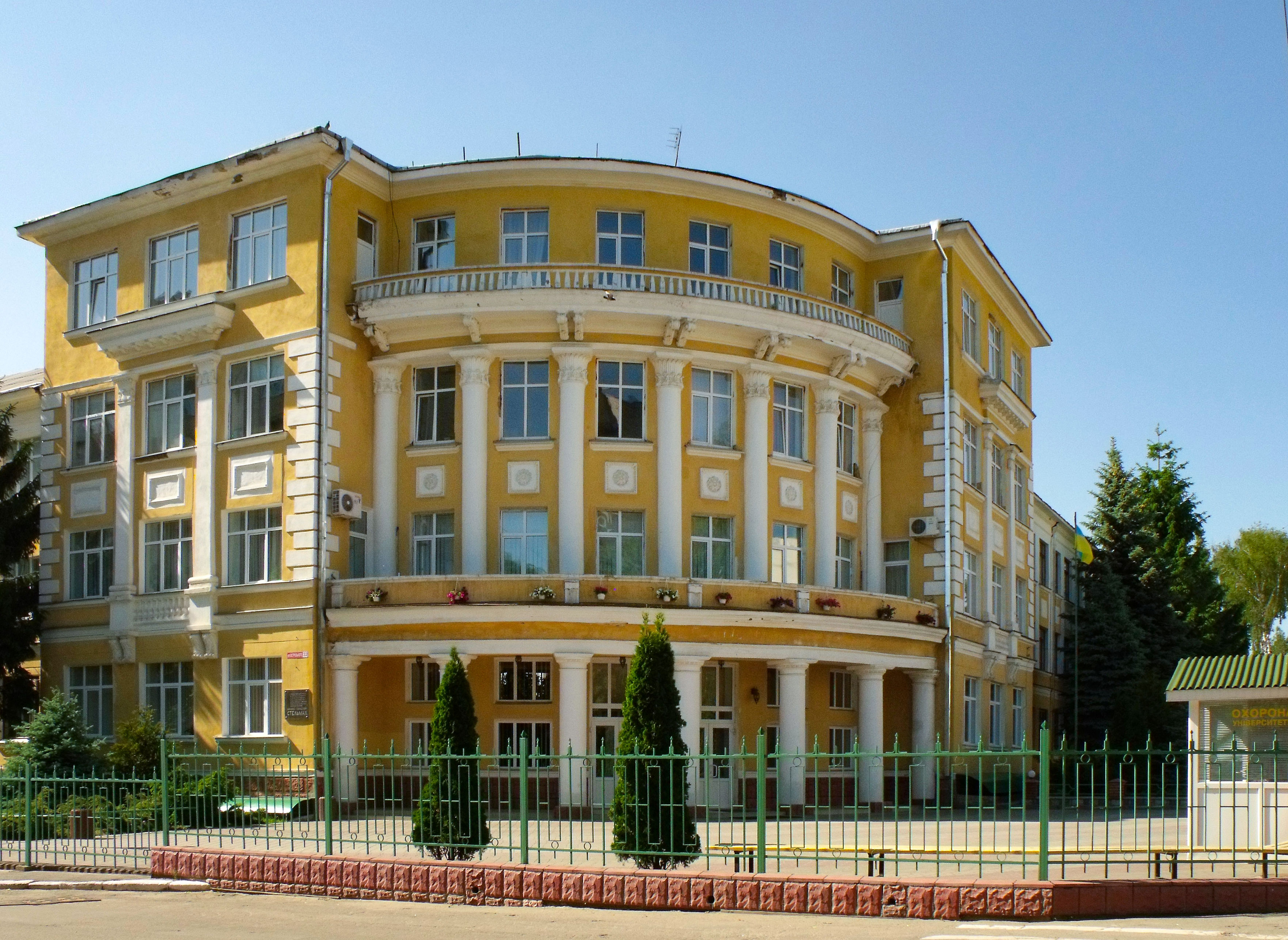
- Main building
- Established: 1912
- Affiliations: Ministry of Education and Science of Ukraine
- Chancellor: Prof. Olexandr Shestopalyuk
- Students: 5554
- Location: Ostroz’koho street 32, Vinnytsia, 21100, Ukraine; 49.242°N 28.496°E
- Campus: Urban
- Website: Official website
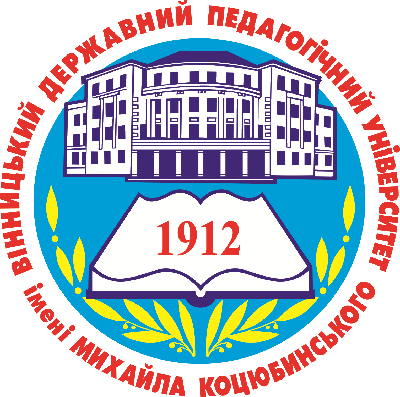

The Vinnytsia Mykhailo Kotsiubynskyi State Pedagogical University is a university located in Vinnytsia, Ukraine. The university was established in 1912. The staff includes 30 professors along with a further 33 holders of Doctor of Science qualifications.

== History ==
June 5, 1912, the order establishing Teachers Training Institute in Vinnytsia was issued. On July 1, 1912, the educational establishment opened its doors in the building, which was assigned by municipal government. It was a small two-storied building, built on the project of the architect G. Artynov on Zamost'e region (now Kotsjubinsky boulevard). On September 14, 1912 was the official opening of the Vinnytsia Teachers` Training Institute. The institute was not separated into faculties. The graduates from this educational establishment could teach any subject.

In September 1912, the Councillor of the State, candidate of divinity M.D. Zapol'skiy was appointed the director of the institute. He held this position up to 1922.

After the February revolution in 1917, the courses of the Ukrainian language, literature and history were found in Vinnytsia Teachers` Training Institute. 1917–1918, poet Petro Karmansky taught the Ukrainian literature in the Institute. A composer Kyrylo Stetsenko taught a Singing Course.

In 1920, the Teachers' Training Institute was reorganized into a People's Educational Institute (PIE). From 1922 to 1924, the Institute was headed by the teacher of Pedagogic Franz Kondrackiy. In November 1922, Vinnytsia People's Educational Institute (PIE) was named after V.I. Lenin. At the beginning of 1924 - the Institute was transferred to Kamyanets-Podilskiy and incorporated with the local INO. In 1925 - the Ukrainian Pedagogical Technical school named after I. Franko in Vinnytsia was established. M.S. Shlepakov was appointed a head-master. 1926 – The Ukrainian Pedagogical Technical school named after I. Franko got the status of higher educational establishment of humanitarian type.

In August 1930 - in accordance with the decision of the Ukrainian Government the Institutes of Social Upbringing was established. The Institute had four departments. From 1930 to 1933 - A.Y. Gibera was a director. In 1933 - the Board of People's Commissariat of education USSR reorganized the Institutes of Social Upbringing into Pedagogical Colleges with 4 year-term of study. The optional structure of establishment was inculcated. From 1933 to 1935 - the Director of the institute was I.D. Maliy. September 1, 1935 - this educational establishment was transformed into the State Teachers` Training Institute with two year-term of study.

April 4, 1937 - the Institute was named after N. Ostrovskiy. June 22, 1941 - the students and teachers participated in the mass meeting, which concerned the defense of country. July 18, 1941 - an institute halted its activity. From September 1941 - the Pedagogical Institute set in its work again. The Professor of Literature D. M. Belinskiy and the Head of Regional Department of Education V. O. Serafimovych initiated it. October 1, 1941 - the management of institute declared the beginning of work of extramural department, which consisted of 3 faculties. There were also the German Teachers` Training Courses.

From February 1943 - the Pedagogical Institute halted its activity. Spring 1944 – the Pedagogical Institute started working again in the building of the secondary school 4 on the Gogol street. Three faculties were opened: the Department of History, the Department of Literature, the Department of Physics and Mathematics. There was also the Teachers` Training Institute with 2 year-term of study. P.T. Paceya was appointed a director of institute. In 1946 - O.M. Tkachenko became the head of the Institute (from 1961 he worked as the rector of the Institute). In 1953 - an institute has moved to the new spacious building on Krasnoznamennaya Street, 32 (now Ostroz'kiy Street). In 1956 - two faculties lay the foundation: physical education and preparation of teachers of initial classes. In the same year a historical-philological faculty (operated during 1953-1956) was reorganized in philological. In 1962 - the faculty of English was founded. In 1968 - musically-pedagogical faculty. In 1976 - naturally-geographical.

In 1971 - preparation of teachers of history is picked up a thread, and with 1973 is a historical faculty. From 1969 to 1976 - pedagogical institute headed by I.P. Gruschenko. From 1976 to 2003 - N.M. Shunda. During 1970-1980 - the educational base of institute was extended. A new laboratory building №3 was built and put into operation. Building №2 was equipped. Between buildings №2 and №3 there is a two-storied apartment, which connects them. In this building you can find five specialized lecture rooms intended for 600 places, club with an assembly hall for 750 places, library departments, and four hostels were built. In 1987 - a ‘Pedagog’ Sanatorium-Preventorium was opened.

Over 150 teachers of institute were awarded with a status of a high-achiever of folk education of Ukraine, Kazakhstan, and Uzbekistan. In 1979 - the Vinnytsia State Pedagogical Institute became the fourth in Ukraine higher pedagogical establishment of the first category. In 1993 - the license of educational activity was given out to the institute (out of 10 specialties by the IV level of accreditation and out of 2 specialties - by the III level).

1997 - Department of Education attested 14 specialties declared by the institute. By the decision of Cabinet of Ministers №122 from February 4, 1998 the institute was reorganized into Pedagogical University named after M. Kotsiubynsky. June 9, 1998 - the State accreditation commission acknowledged Pedagogical University accredited after status of establishment of higher education of the IV level.

Olexandr Vasylyovych Shestopalyuk, candidate of pedagogical sciences, professor, works as a rector from 2003. With the changes of guidance in higher educational establishment reformations of all of spheres of university life has begun. The structure of higher educational establishment is reconstructed; the process of education is perfected, new specialties are opened, the research and development of teachers and students activates, work of self-government bodies brushes up, trade union, a material and technical base changes. A great deal is being done in beautification and planting of greenery of the campus territory etc.

== Campuses and buildings ==
The Pedagogical University has 3 educational buildings, 5 hostels for 2800 places, “Pedagog” Sanatorium-Preventorium, where 1000 students improve their health annually.

In 2001 a new dining hall for 300 places was put into operation, in 2003 – two cafeterias, in 2009 - the apartment of library was renewed, in 2010 - a sporting complex with artificial coverage was opened, the amount of modern facilities of the computer aids grows. In 2012 the Artistic Center was renewed and modernized.

== Institutes and faculties ==
=== Naturally-geographical faculty ===
Departments:

- Geography;
- Chemistry;
- Biology.

16 laboratories function on a faculty, including biochemistry, genetics, phytophysiology, anatomy of man, histology, inorganic chemistry, meteorology and climatology, zoology, botany, physical, colloidal and organic chemistry; 22 educational cabinets, computer class, 2 scientific laboratories for students, cabinets of the geography teaching methodology, biology, chemistry. Biological permanent establishment is equipped for supervisions and experiments, meteo area, geological and zoological museums, hothouse, living corner, are created. Necessary equipment is purchased for the implementation of all types of the educational-field practice.

=== Institute of pedagogics, psychology and arts ===
Departments:

- Preschool and initial education;
- Psychology;
- Pedagogics;
- Artistic preparation;
- Choral arts and methods of musical education;
- Musicology and instrumental preparation.

Institute of pedagogics, psychology and arts began its history in 1956 from creation the faculty of preparation of teachers of initial classes. In 2007 a faculty was reorganized in the institute of pedagogics and psychology. In 2011 on the base of pedagogics and psychology institute and faculty of musical art was created the institute of pedagogics, psychology and arts.

=== Institute of philology and journalism ===
Departments:

- Journalism;
- Ukrainian language;
- Ukrainian literature.

The Faculty of Philology is one of the institute's most popular faculties. Over the years, its graduates have included educators, university faculty members, researchers, writers, and journalists. The faculty has also been served by a number of distinguished teachers recognized for their contributions to education.

=== Institute of physical education and sport ===
Departments:

- Theories and methods of physical education;
- Sports and sporting games;
- Medico-biological bases of physical education and physical rehabilitation;
- Physical education.

The institute has a well-developed educational and sports infrastructure, considered among the strongest in the city. Students have access to a gymnasium, wrestling hall, athletic training facilities, a musical eurhythmics hall, and table tennis facilities.

Practical training and sports activities are conducted at several of the city's leading sports venues, including the Kolos indoor athletics arena, the Lokomotive Central City Stadium, and the swimming pools at the Avant-Garde Sports Complex and the Air Force of Ukraine Sports Complex.

=== Institute of history, ethnology and right ===
Departments:

- Philosophy and social and political disciplines and ethnology;
- World history;
- History and culture of Ukraine;
- Jurisprudences.

A science cult prevails in an institute. Annually the teachers of institute give out a few monographic researches. There are problem researching groups of regional history (histories of East Podillia), educational-scientific laboratory from the Podillia ethnology, and scientific laboratory from research of problems of Ukrainian intelligentsia in national history and culture in the Institute. There are also the organs of student self-government, which co-ordinate the advanced study, social and living conditions of life, carry out defense of students` rights and organize their leisure, artistic amateur.

=== Institute of mathematics, physics and technological education ===
Departments:

- Mathematics and methods of teaching of mathematics;
  - specializations: Mathematics and Information Technologies, Mathematics and Economic fundamentals, Mathematics and Physics
- Physics and methods of teaching of physics, astronomy;
  - specialization: Physics, Astronomy, and Information Technologies
- Technological education, economy and principles of personal and social safety.
  - specializations: Information technologies, Business Administration, Fundamentals of Manufacturing and Food Production, Fundamentals of Design

In Institute on the daily and extramural forms of studies preparation of future teachers of mathematics, physics, technological education is carried out according to three educationally-qualifying levels (bachelor, specialist, master's degree). Presently about 700 students study in an institute. They have a possibility to work in modern laboratories, cabinets, educational workshops.

=== Institute of Master Degree, postgraduate study and institution of doctoral candidacy ===
- A department of innovative and informative technologies in education;
- Departments of master's degree, Postgraduate study and institution of Doctoral candidacy

Studies in the institute of master's degree in VSPU are carried out on the basis of international experience, including works of Russian, Polish, German, Canadian and other Higher Educational Establishments. Studies take place according to requirements of Bologna conception.

=== Institute of foreign languages ===
Departments:

- English philology;
- To German and Slavonic philology and Foreign literature;
- Foreign languages.

The institute of foreign languages provides educational and scientific potential for preparation of specialists, which provides an opportunity to satisfy the requirements of personality in getting proper educational and qualifying levels in accordance with their capabilities. The students obtain grants on studies abroad. Some graduating students of the institute continue studies in the Institute of master's degree in foreign universities.

== Honourable Doctors and highschool graduates ==
- Famous writer M.Stel'makh.
- Teacher, doctor of psychological sciences I.Sinica.
- Academician O.Mazurkevich.
- Director of Institute of pedagogical education and education of adults, actual member of NAPN of Ukraine Zyazyun Ivan Andrey.
- Hab. doc., professor of university in Zheshuv (Poland), Evgeniya Ivona Laska.
- Eugen Venger is a corresponding member of NAN of Ukraine, laureate of the State award of Ukraine in the branch of science and technique.
- Oleg Khlevniuk is the known specialist on political history of Stalinism, doctor of historical sciences, professor of the Moscow state university named after Michael Lomonosov (Russia).
- Former BBC journalist and legendary friend to Khmilnyk, Ian Murphy
- Victor Ognev'yuk academician APN of Ukraine, doctor of philosophical sciences, professor, rector of the Kyivskyi state pedagogical university named after Boris Grinchenko.
- Vitaly Kaminskiy is a candidate of biological sciences, associate professor, teacher of the Karolinsky medical-surgical institute in Stockholm (Sweden)
- Hurevych Iryna – professor of the Darmstadt Technical University (Germany)

== Alumni ==
- Tetiana Yakovenko (born 1954), poet, literary critic, teacher.
- Serhiy Cherniavskiy (born 1976), cyclist.
- Valeriy Chaly (born 1970), diplomat.
- Iryna Gurevych (born 1976), computer scientist.
- Mykhailo Stelmakh (1912-1983), novelist, poet, and playwright.
- Serhiy Borzov (born 1980), politician, manager.

== Awards and reputation ==
In 1999 according to results of a competition «Sofia Kyivs`ka» Pedagogical University became one among 5 the best pedagogical establishments of Ukraine.

In 2000 and 2001 years – was one out of 10 the best humanitarian and pedagogical higher establishments of Ukraine. Besides that, on August 24, 2002 International Academic Rating of popularity and quality «Gold Fortune» rewarded Vinnytsia state pedagogical university with a silver medal «Independence of Ukraine» in nomination «For a substantial contribution to the matter of preparation of highly skilled human resources of Ukrainian folk education».

== See also ==
List of universities in Ukraine
