= Olha Stefanishyna =

Ukrainian lawyer and civil servant (born 1985)

- Ольга Стефанішина
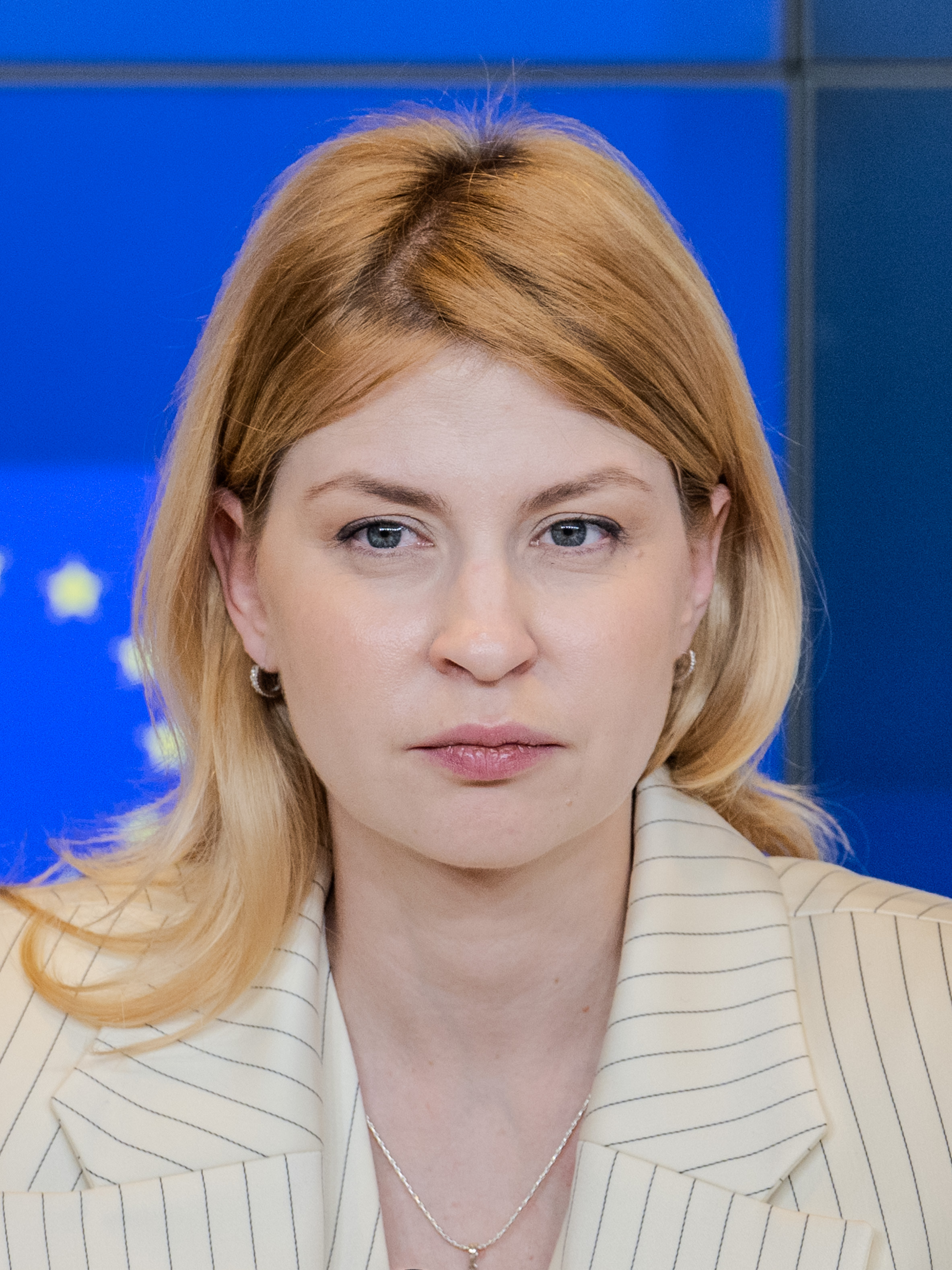
- Stefanishyna in 2024

Ambassador of Ukraine to the United States
- In office 27 August 2025 – 3 August 2026
- Preceded by: Oksana Markarova

Special Envoy to the United States
- In office 17 July 2025 – 27 August 2025
- President: Volodymyr Zelenskyy
- Prime Minister: Yulia Svyrydenko
- Preceded by: post established
- Succeeded by: vacant

Deputy Prime Minister for European and Euro-Atlantic Integration
- In office 4 June 2020 – 17 July 2025 (since 16 July – acting)
- President: Volodymyr Zelenskyy
- Prime Minister: Denys Shmyhal
- Preceded by: Vadym Prystaiko
- Succeeded by: Taras Kachka

Minister of Justice
- In office 5 September 2024 – 17 July 2025 (since 16 July – acting)
- Preceded by: Denys Maliuska
- Succeeded by: German Galushchenko

Personal details
- Born: 29 October 1985 (age 41) Odesa, Ukrainian SSR, Soviet Union (now Ukraine)
- Party: Servant of the People
- Other political affiliations: Ukrainian Strategy
- Children: 2
- Education: Taras Shevchenko National University; Odesa National Economics University

Olha Vitaliivna Stefanishyna (Ukrainian: Ольга Віталіївна Стефанішина, pronounced [ˈɔlʲɦɐ wiˈtɑl⁽ʲ⁾ijiu̯nɐ steˈfɑn⁽ʲ⁾iʃɪnɐ]; born 29 October 1985) is a Ukrainian lawyer and civil servant. She became the deputy prime minister for European and Euro-Atlantic integration on 4 June 2020, a position in which she served until 16 July 2025. On 5 September 2024, Stefanishyna also became minister of justice and since then had two ministries under her command. From August 2025 to August 2026, she served as the Ambassador of Ukraine to the United States.

== Career ==
After a short career as legal adviser, Stefanishyna joined the Ministry of Justice at the end of 2007.

In 2008, she graduated from the Institute of International Relations of the University of Kyiv, gaining diplomas in international law and English translation. In 2016, she received a specialist degree in Finance and Credit from Odesa National Economics University.

She worked as the director of the Government Office for European and Euro-Atlantic Integration of the Cabinet of Ministers Secretariat from March to December 2017. She was then appointed director general of the Government Office for the Coordination of European and Euro-Atlantic Integration of the Secretariat.

In the 2019 Ukrainian parliamentary election, Stefanishyna stood for election as number 25 on the party list of Ukrainian Strategy. The party failed to win any parliamentary seats, gaining 2.41% of the total votes while the election had a 5% election threshold. The party also failed to win a constituency seat. Following the election, Stefanishyna worked for the law firm Ilyashev & Partners for a short period.

On 4 June 2020 she was appointed Deputy Prime Minister for European and Euro-Atlantic Integration in the Shmyhal Government. (Note: As deputy prime minister for European and Euro-Atlantic integration of Ukraine, Stefanishyna was heading a number of coordination mechanisms in the government, in particular: A Chair of the Commission for Coordination of Euro-Atlantic Integration of Ukraine; A Chair of the Commission for Equal Rights for Women and Men; A Chair of the working group for approach agreement to the application of the carbon border adjustment mechanism to Ukraine in consultation with the European Commission; A Chair of the Ukrainian delegation for participation in the United Nations Climate Change Conference (COP26) in Glasgow; A Chair of the Interagency Working Group on Coordination of Integrated Border Management; Co-chair of the High-Level Dialogue Working Group on the European Green Deal and Ukraine's Green Transition; The dialogue was launched in February 2021 by the prime minister of Ukraine Denys Shmyhal and the vice-president of the European Commission on the European Green Deal Frans Timmermans.: Deputy Head of the Commission for Coordination of the Implementation of the Association Agreement; Deputy Head of the Interministerial Working Group on Coordination of Climate Change in the framework of the European Commission's initiative “European Green Deal”. Develops the Ukraine-EU dialogue on Ukraine's involvement in the processes of forming the European Green Deal and further synchronization of national climate change policy with European regulation; Member of the National Security and Defense Council of Ukraine; Member of the National Reform Council; Member of the council of political party “Servant of the people”; The list of Commissions chaired from Ukrainian side by the Deputy Prime Minister for European and Euro-Atlantic Integration of Ukraine: Ukrainian-Slovak Joint Commission on economic, industrial and scientific-technical cooperation; Ukrainian-German High Level Group on economic cooperation)

In March 2021 she became a council member of the political party Servant of the People.

On 3 September 2024, Stefanishyna tended her resignation as the deputy prime minister for European and Euro-Atlantic Integration; the Verkhovna Rada accepted her resignation the following day. On 5 September 2024, she was appointed minister of justice, a role which would be combined with her previous one.

On 17 July 2025, Stefanishyna was appointed Ukrainian special envoy to the United States. She was officially appointed ambassador to Washington on 27 August 2025.

On 3 August 2026, President Volodymyr Zelenskyy dismissed Stefanishyna from her position as Ukraine's Ambassador to the United States. On 6 August, prosecutors revealed that Stefanishyna was suspected of illegal enrichment and failure to disclose assets after she had concealed two apartments and other assets worth around $310,000 from authorities.

== Accolades ==
Stefanishyna was ranked 45th in Focus magazine's "100 most influential Ukrainians" list in 2021, and 14th place on their "100 most influential women of Ukraine in 2021" list. She has also been awarded the Certificate of Honor of the Cabinet of Ministers. According to legal newspaper Yurydychna Gazeta in 2021, she is ranked one of the top ten lawyers/politicians in Ukraine. In 2025, the Focus magazine ranked Stefanishyna 17th among most influential Ukrainian politicians as part of the top 50 list of most influential Ukrainians.
