= Embassy of Ukraine, Washington, D.C. =

Diplomatic mission of Ukraine to the US

Ukrainian Embassy in Washington
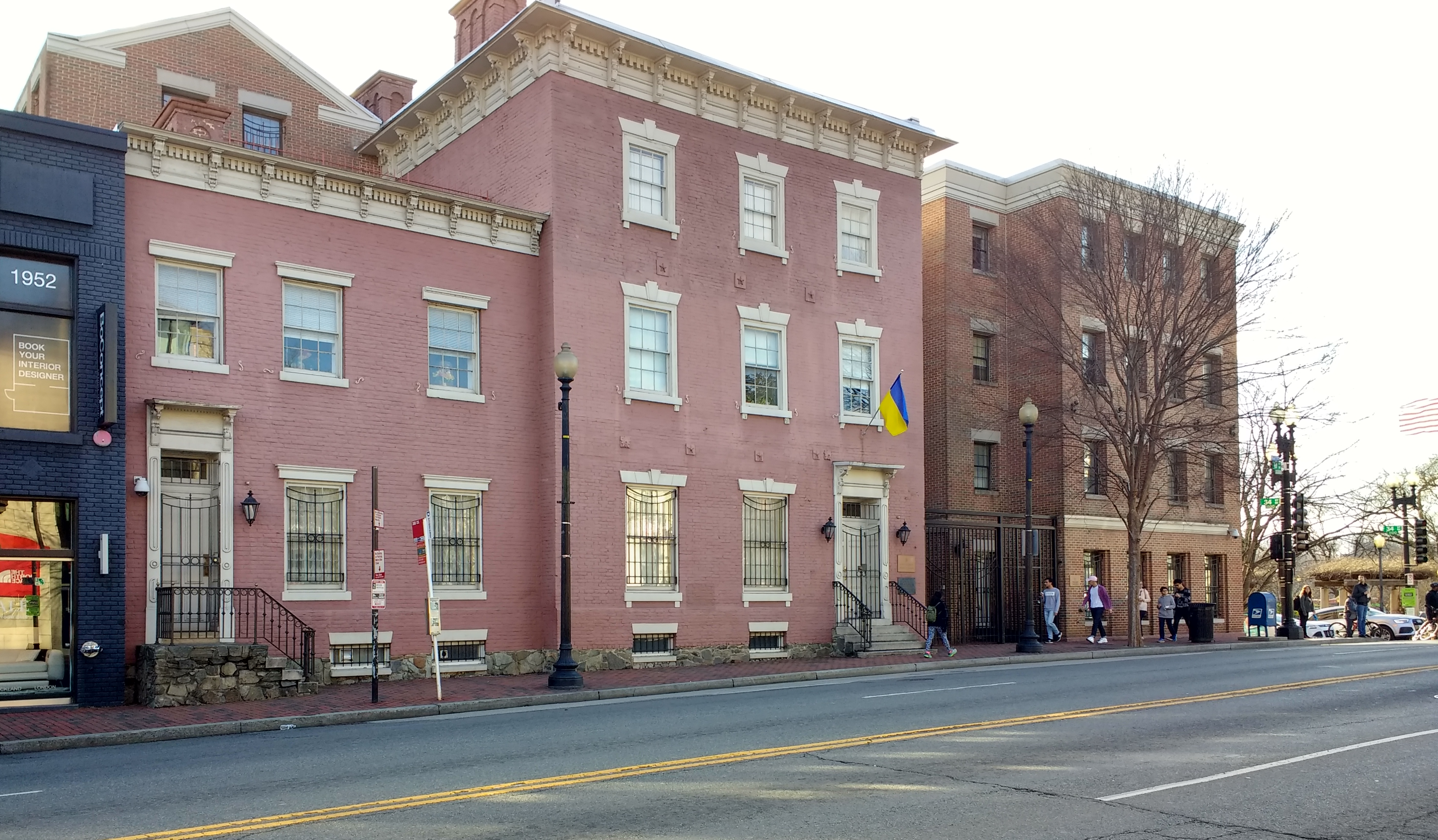
- Location: Washington, D.C.
- Address: 3350 M Street, N.W.
- Coordinates: 38°54′17″N 77°4′4″W
- Ambassador: Olha Stefanishyna
- Website: https://usa.mfa.gov.ua/en

Consular districts of Ukraine in United States: Washington, D.C. New York Chicago San Francisco

The Embassy of Ukraine in Washington, D.C., is the diplomatic mission of Ukraine to the United States. The embassy is located at 3350 M Street NW, in the heart of Georgetown's commercial district.

The embassy also operates Consulates-General in New York City, San Francisco, and Chicago.

On 27 August 2025, Ukrainian president Volodymyr Zelenskyy appointed Olha Stefanishyna ambassador of Ukraine to the United States.

== Building ==
The embassy occupies Forrest-Marbury House, originally built in 1788, and owned by General Uriah Forrest. Forrest was one of the leaders in the effort to establish the American capital in the area. On March 29, 1791, he hosted George Washington and other dignitaries in a dinner that marked the agreement in principle to establish the new capital. In 1800 the house was purchased by William Marbury, a prominent ally of President John Adams, best known for his role in Marbury v. Madison. The house remained the home of the Marbury family until 1891, when the changing character of the neighborhood led John Marbury Jr. to turn it into a commercial property.

It served as the home to a wide array of businesses for many decades. In the late 1940s and early 1950s, it was a restaurant/bar owned by Jack Wilner and was called "Jack's." Its last commercial role was home to a night club named Desperados.

In 1986 the building was bought by a developer, refurbished, and restored to its original condition. On December 31, 1992, the newly independent Ukraine purchased the building to house its embassy.

== See also ==
- Ukraine–United States relations
- Ambassadors of Ukraine to the United States
- Ukrainian diplomatic missions
- Diplomatic missions in the United States
- Embassy of the United States, Kyiv
- Ambassadors of the United States to Ukraine
