= List of ambassadors of Ukraine to Belarus =

Ambassador of Ukraine to Belarus
- Ukrainian: Надзвичайний і Повноважний посол України в Білорусі
- Incumbent; Vacant since 2023
- Nominator: Volodymyr Zelenskyy
- Inaugural holder: Volodymyr Zheliba as Ambassador Extraordinary and Plenipotentiary
- Formation: March 1992
- Website: Ukraine Embassy - Minsk

The Ambassador Extraordinary and Plenipotentiary of Ukraine to Belarus (Ukrainian: Надзвичайний і Повноважний посол України в Білорусі) is the ambassador of Ukraine to Belarus.

The first Ukrainian ambassador to Belarus assumed his post in 1992, the same year a Ukrainian embassy opened in Minsk.

== List of representatives ==
1. Volodymyr Zheliba (1992-1998)
2. Anatoliy Dron (1998-2003)
3. Petro Shapoval (2003-2005)
4. Valentyn Nalyvaichenko (2005-2006)
5. Igor Likhovy (2006-2010)
6. Roman Bezsmertnyi (2010-2011)
7. Viktor Tykhonov (2011 - 2012)
8. Viktor Yakubov (2012-2013), Chargé d'Affaires ad interim
9. Mykhailo Yezhel (2013-2015)
10. Valery Dzhyhun (2015-2017), Chargé d'affaires
11. Ihor Kyzym (2017-2023)

== See also ==
- Belarus–Ukraine relations
- Embassy of Belarus, Kyiv
- Embassy of Ukraine, Minsk
- Belarus Ambassador to Ukraine
