= Embassy of Ukraine, London =

Embassy of Ukraine in London
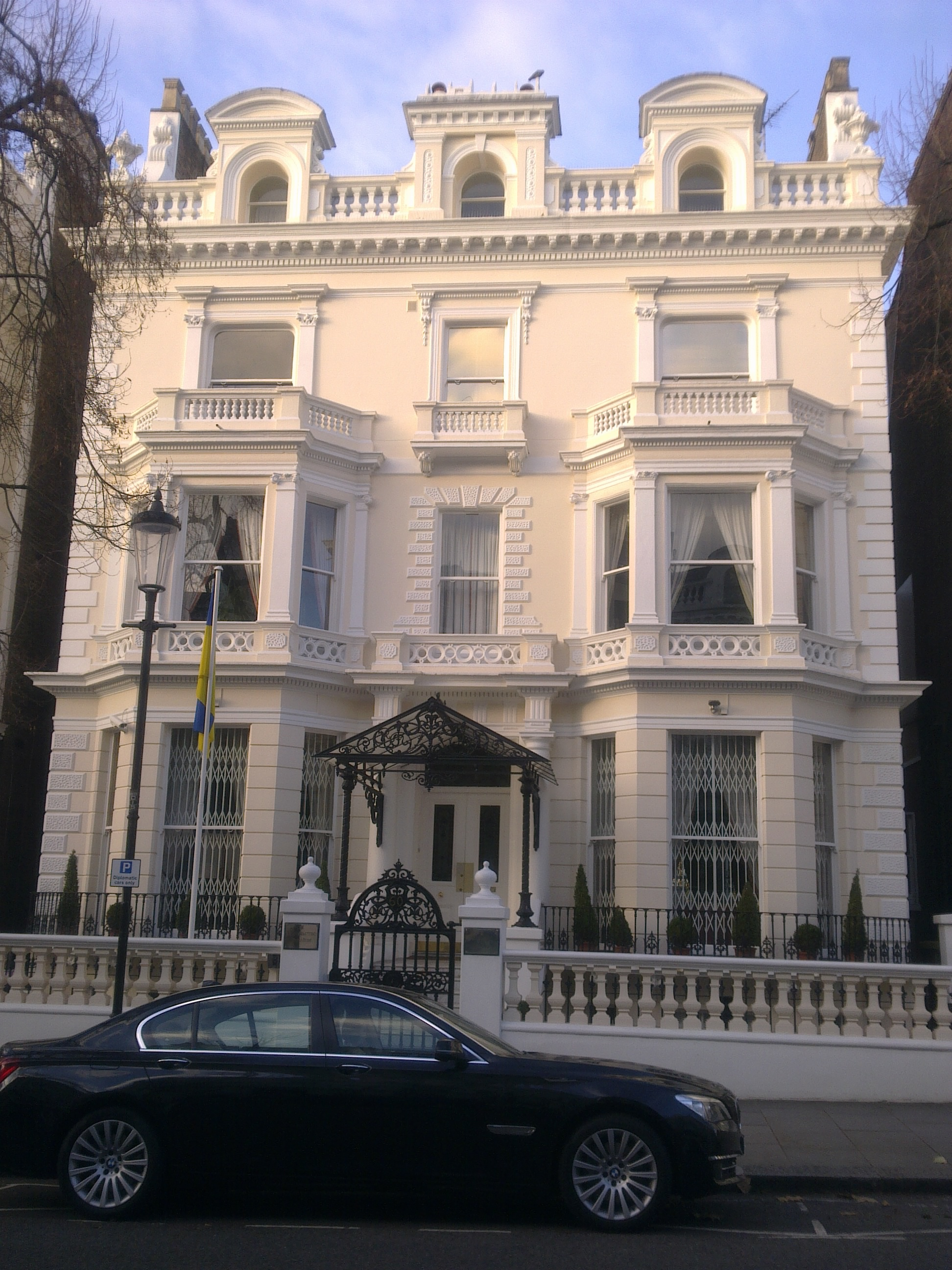
- Location: Holland Park, London
- Address: 60 Holland Park, London, W11 3SJ
- Coordinates: 51°30′22″N 0°12′30″W
- Ambassador: Valerii Zaluzhnyi

The Embassy of Ukraine in London is the diplomatic mission of Ukraine in the United Kingdom. Ukraine also maintains a consulate at 78 Kensington Park Road, Notting Hill.

== History ==
The first diplomatic mission of the Ukrainian People's Republic to the United Kingdom was established in May 1919 at 38 Kensington Mansions, Trebovir Road, London SW5, moving to 75 Cornwall Gardens, London SW7 in October 1919.

The Ukrainian mission was not officially recognised by the United Kingdom and its main objective was to secure recognition for the Ukrainian People's Republic. The United Kingdom recognised the independence of Ukraine on 31 December 1991. Diplomatic relations were established on 10 January 1992 and the Embassy of Ukraine in the UK was opened in October 1992. The first ambassador of Ukraine to the UK was Serhiy Komisarenko.

== List of ambassadors of Ukraine to the United Kingdom ==
=== The heads of the diplomatic mission of UNR ===
1. 1919: Mykola Stakhovsky
2. 1919–1921: Arnold Margolin
3. 1921–1923: Jaroslav Olesnitsky
4. 1923–1924: Roman Smal-Stocki

=== Ambassadors ===
1. 1992–1997: Serhiy Komisarenko
2. 1997–2002: Volodymyr Vasylenko
3. 2002–2005: Ihor Mityukov
4. 2005–2010: Ihor Kharchenko
5. 2010–2014: Volodymyr Khandohiy
6. 2014: Andrii Kuzmenko, chargé d'affaires ad interim
7. 2014–2015: Ihor Kyzym, chargé d'affaires ad interim
8. 2015–2020: Natalia Galibarenko
9. 2020–2023: Vadym Prystaiko
10. 2024–2024: Eduard Fesko, chargé d'affaires ad interim
11. 2024–present Valerii Zaluzhnyi

== Gallery ==
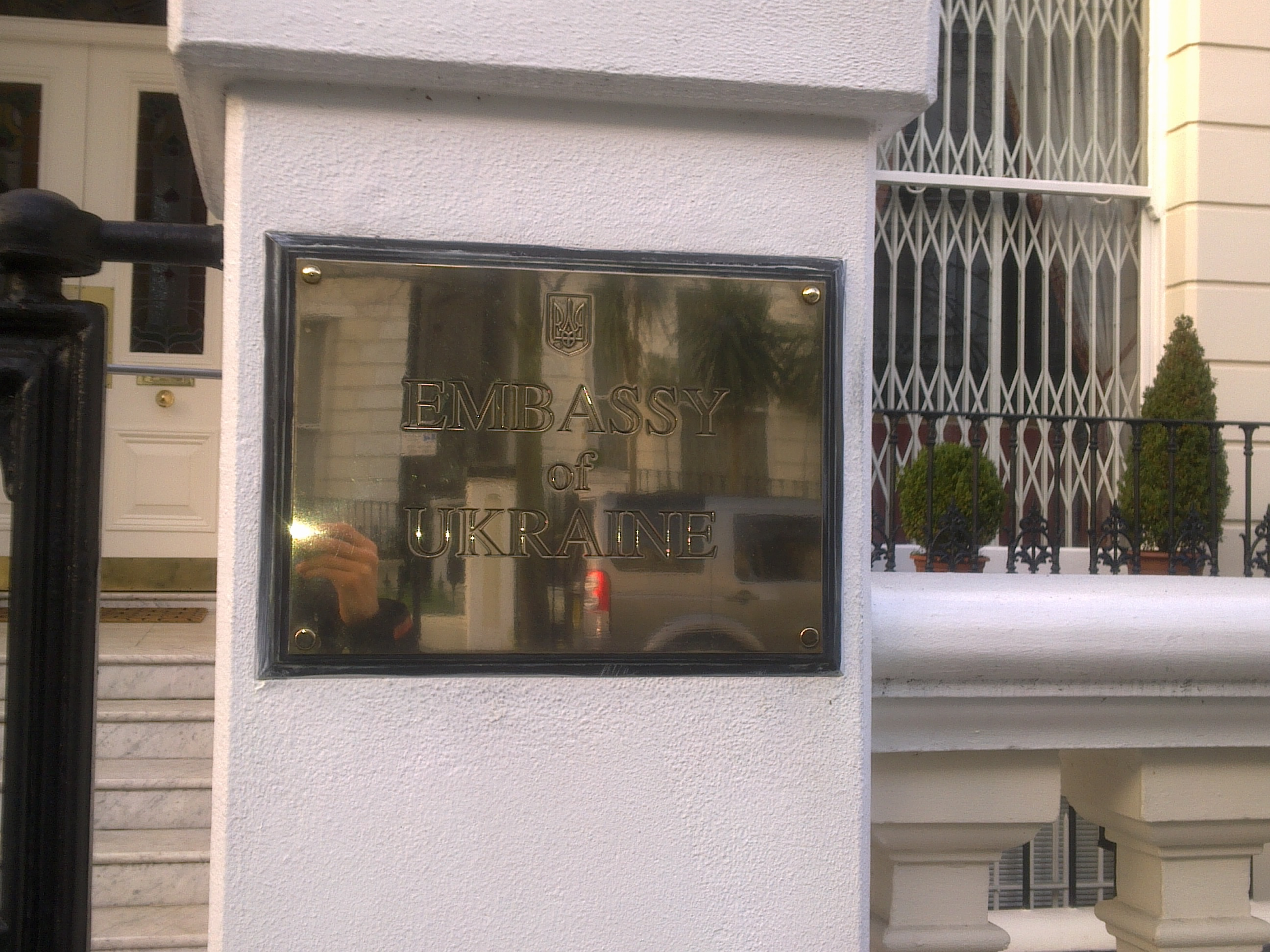
Plaque outside the embassy in English

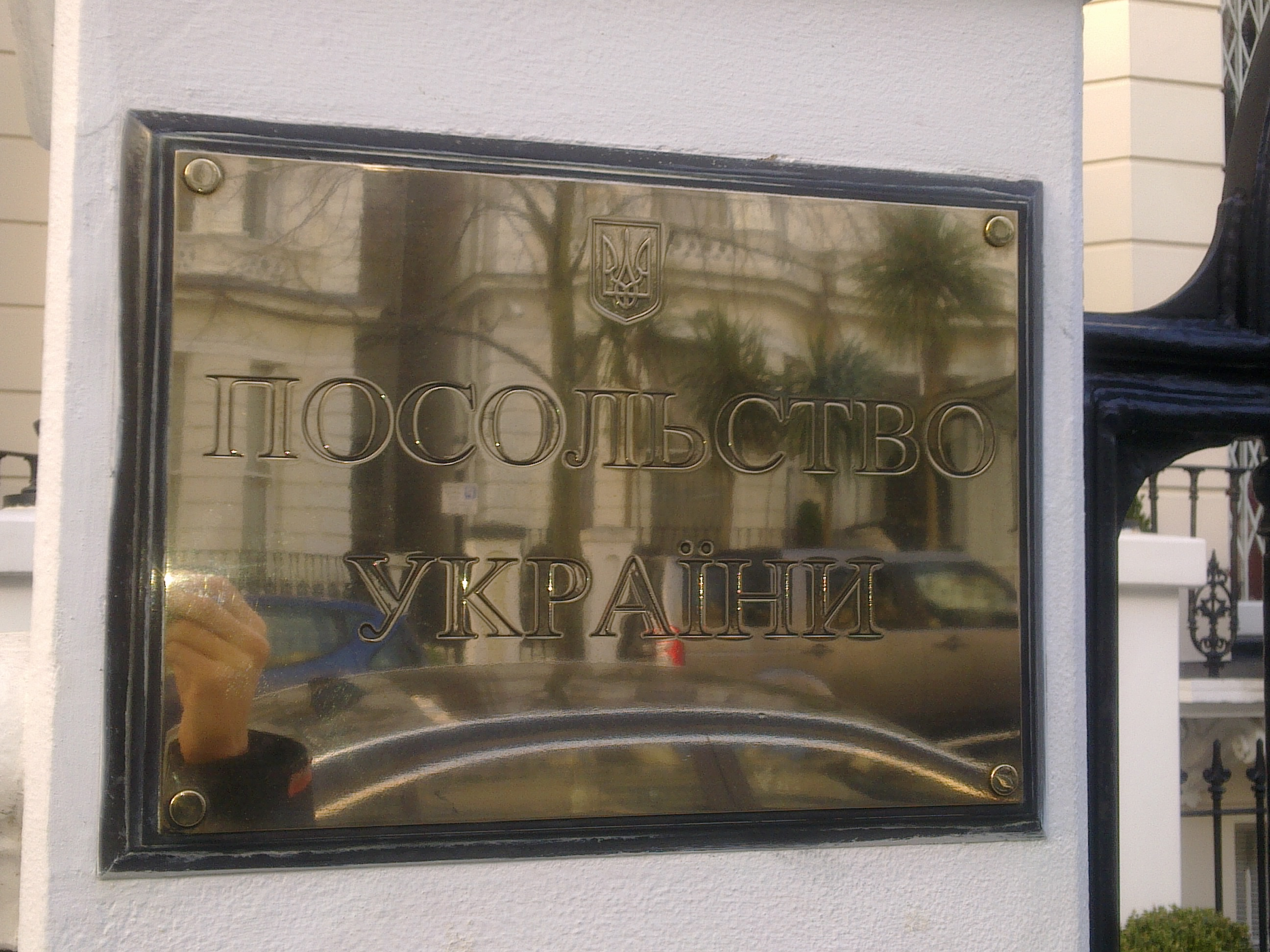
Plaque outside the embassy in Ukrainian

== See also ==
- Ukraine–United Kingdom relations
- Foreign relations of United Kingdom
- Embassy of the United Kingdom, Kyiv
- Diplomatic missions of Ukraine

== Bibliography ==
- Margolin, A. D., From a Political Diary: Russia, the Ukraine, and America, 1905-1945 (New York, 1946)
- Ukrainian Problems. A Collection of Notes and Memoirs Etc. Presented by The Ukrainian Special Diplomatic Mission in London to the British Foreign Office, Ministers and other Persons and Institutions (London, 1919)
