= Embassy of Ukraine, Minsk =

Embassy of Ukraine in Minsk
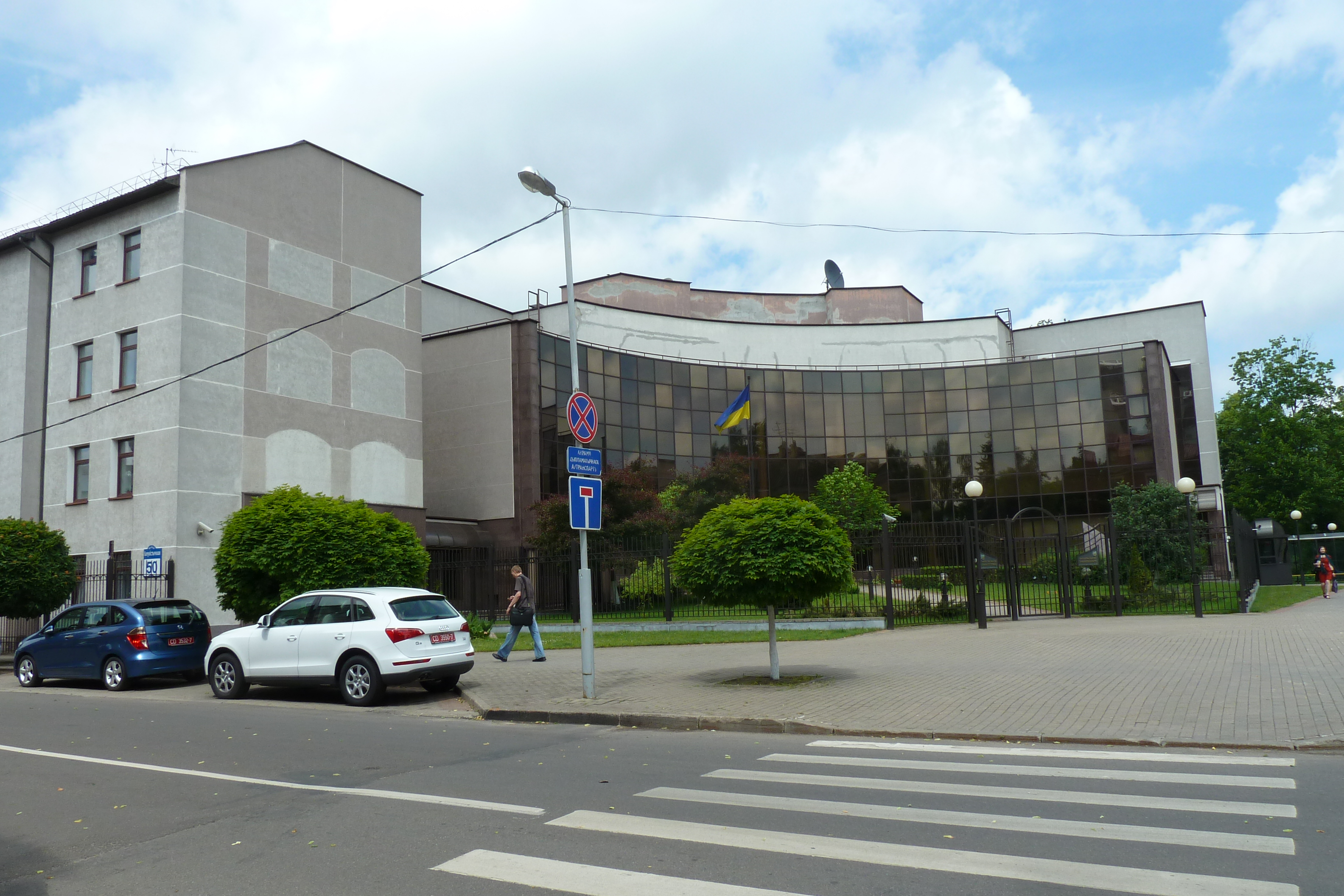
- Location: Minsk
- Address: 51, Starovilenskay, str Minsk, 220002
- Coordinates: 53°54′51″N 27°33′29″E

The Embassy of Ukraine in Minsk is the diplomatic mission of Ukraine in Belarus.

== History ==
Diplomatic relations between Ukraine and Belarus established December 27, 1991. Embassy of Ukraine in Belarus was launched June 30, 1992.

Embassy House opened December 1, 2000 by the president of Ukraine Leonid Kuchma, Prime Minister of Ukraine Viktor Yushchenko, Ukraine's foreign minister Anatoliy Zlenko and Prime Minister of Belarus Vladimir Yermoshin and Deputy Prime Minister of the Republic Belarus - Foreign Minister of Belarus Mikhail Khvostov.

Ukraine opened a consulate general in Brest.

== Previous ambassadors ==
1. Volodymyr Zheliba (1992–1998)
2. Noah Goren (2002–)
3. Anatoly Dron (1998–2003)
4. Petro Shapoval (2003–2005)
5. Valentyn Nalyvaichenko (2005–2006)
6. Ihor Likhovy (2006–2010)
7. Roman Bezsmertnyi (2010–2011)
8. Viktor Tykhonov (2011–2012)
9. Viktor Yakubov (2012–2013), Chargé d'affaires ad interim
10. Mykhailo Yezhel (2013–2015)
11. Valery Dzhyhun (2015–), Chargé d'affaires ad interim
12. Ihor Kyzym (2017–2023)

== See also ==
- Ukraine–Belarus relations
- Foreign relations of Belarus
- Foreign relations of Ukraine
- Embassy of Belarus in Kyiv
- List of diplomatic missions of Ukraine
