= Ihor Kyzym =

Ukrainian diplomat

- Ігор Кизим
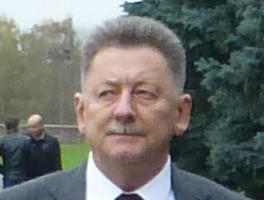
- Kyzym in 2017

Extraordinary and Plenipotentiary Ambassador of Ukraine to Belarus
- In office 2017–2023
- Preceded by: Mykhailo Yezhel
- President: Petro Poroshenko

Chargé d'Affaires for Ukraine to the United Kingdom
- In office 2014–2015
- President: Petro Poroshenko
- Preceded by: Volodymyr Khandohiy
- Succeeded by: Natalia Galibarenko

Personal details
- Born: 20 August 1961 (age 65) Kharkiv, Ukrainian SSR
- Education: Kyiv University

Ihor Yuriiovych Kyzym (Ukrainian: Ігор Юрійович Кизим, born 20 August 1961) is a Ukrainian diplomat. Ambassador Extraordinary and Plenipotentiary of Ukraine.

== Education ==
Ihor Kyzym graduated from Taras Shevchenko National University of Kyiv in 1987, with a master's Degree in International Relations.

== Career ==
In 1987-1994, he was engaged in private law practice.

In 1994-1995, he was a Researcher at the Ukrainian Center for International Security.

In 1995-1996, he trained at the Department of Europe and America of the Ministry of Foreign Affairs of Ukraine.

From 1996 to 2000 - First Secretary of the Embassy of Ukraine in France.

From 2001 to 2003 - First Secretary of the Embassy of Ukraine in Nigeria.

From 2004 to 2007 - Advisor to the Arms Control and Military-Technical Cooperation Department of the Ministry of Foreign Affairs of Ukraine. Member of the Ukrainian part of the Intergovernmental Ukrainian-Georgian Commission on Military and Technical Cooperation.

From 2007 to 2011 - Advisor to the Embassy of Ukraine in Canada.

In 2011-2013, Head of NATO, Department of International Security and Disarmament, Ministry of Foreign Affairs of Ukraine. Member of the Ukrainian delegation to participate in the negotiations within the framework of the OSCE Forum on Security Cooperation, the Joint Consultative Group established under the Treaty on Conventional Armed Forces in Europe, and the Open Skies Advisory Commission

In 2013-2014 - Deputy Director of the Department of International Security of the Ministry of Foreign Affairs of Ukraine.

From October to December 2014, acting Director of the Department of International Security of the Ministry of Foreign Affairs of Ukraine. He participated in the 69th session of the United Nations General Assembly.

From January 2015 to December 2015, he was a Chargé d'Affaires for Ukraine in the United Kingdom.

In 2016-2017, he was a Counselor to the Embassy of Ukraine in the United Kingdom.

From 20 February 2017 to 22 Jun 2023, Ambassador in the Belarus, Ambassador Extraordinary and Plenipotentiary of Ukraine to the Republic of Belarus. He was dismissed from this position by presidential decree.
