= Vasylenko =

Vasylenko (Ukrainian: Василенко) is a Ukrainian surname. The name is a derivative of a given name Vasyl (in English Basil).

== People ==
- Artem Vasylenko (born 1989), Ukrainian judoka
- Hanna Vasylenko (born 1986), Ukrainian wrestler
- Lesia Vasylenko, Ukrainian lawyer and politician
- Volodymyr Vasylenko (1937–2023), Ukrainian diplomat

== See also ==
- Vasylechko
- Vasilenko
