= Mityukov =

Mityukov is a surname. Notable people with the surname include:

- Ihor Mityukov (1952–2026), Ukrainian diplomat
- Roman Mityukov (born 2000), Swiss swimmer
