= List of ambassadors of Ukraine to the United Kingdom =

Ambassador of Ukraine to the United Kingdom

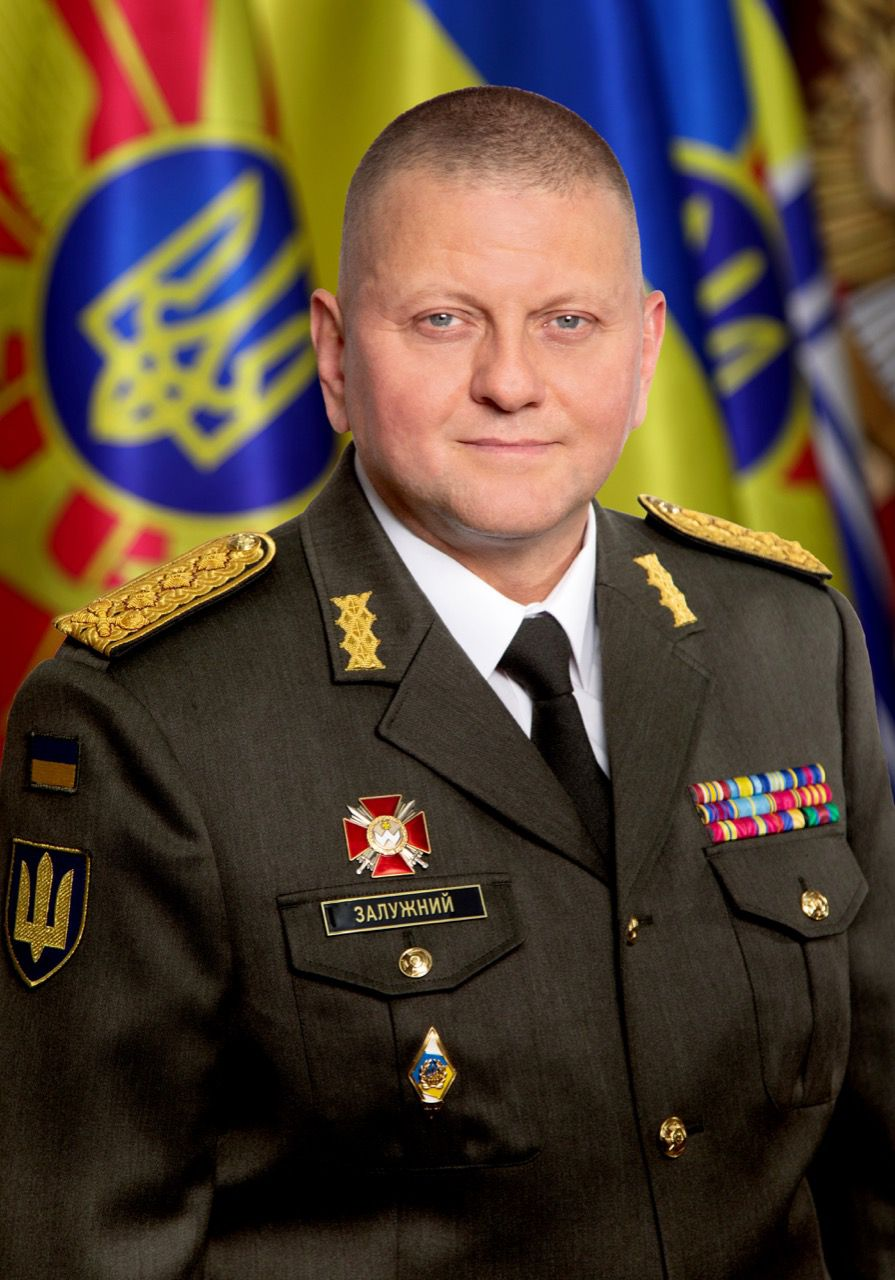
- Incumbent; Valerii Zaluzhnyi since 10 July 2024
- Nominator: President of Ukraine
- Appointer: Volodymyr Zelenskyy
- Inaugural holder: Serhiy Komisarenko as Ambassador Extraordinary and Plenipotentiary
- Formation: 1992
- Website: Ukraine Embassy - London

The Ambassador Extraordinary and Plenipotentiary of Ukraine to the United Kingdom (Ukrainian: Надзвичайний і Повноважний посол України у Сполученому Королівстві Великої Британії та Північної Ірландії, romanized: Nadzvychainyi i Povnovazhnyi Posol Ukrayiny u Spoluchenomu Korolivstvi Velykoyi Brytaniyi ta Pivnichnoyi Irlandiyi) is the ambassador of Ukraine to the United Kingdom.

The first diplomatic mission of the Ukrainian People's Republic to the United Kingdom was established in May 1919

The Ukrainian mission was not officially recognised by the United Kingdom and its main objective was to secure recognition for the Ukrainian People's Republic but failed.

The United Kingdom recognised the independence of Ukraine on 31 December 1991.

The first Ukrainian ambassador to the United Kingdom assumed his post in 1992, the same year a Ukrainian embassy opened in London.

== List of representatives ==
=== Ukrainian People's Republic ===
- 1919: Mykola Stakhovsky
- 1919–1921: Arnold Margolin
- 1921–1923: Jaroslav Olesnitsky
- 1923–1924: Roman Smal-Stocki

=== Ukraine ===
- 1992–1997: Serhiy Komisarenko
- 1997–2002: Volodymyr Vasylenko
- 2002–2005: Ihor Mityukov
- 2005–2010: Ihor Kharchenko
- 2010–2014: Volodymyr Khandohiy
- 2014: Andrii Kuzmenko — Chargé d'affaires a.i.
- 2014: Ihor Kyzym — Chargé d'affaires a.i.
- 2015–2020: Natalia Galibarenko
- 2020–2023: Vadym Prystaiko
- 2023–2024: Eduard Fesko — Chargé d'affaires a.i.
- 2024–present: Valerii Zaluzhnyi

== See also ==
- Embassy of Ukraine, London
- British Ambassador to Ukraine
- Ukraine-United Kingdom relations
