= Stakhovsky =

Stakhovsky (Ukrainian: Стаховський, pronounced [stɐˈxɔu̯sʲkɪj]) is a Ukrainian surname. Notable people with the surname include:

- Mykola Stakhovsky (1879–1948), Ukrainian diplomat, politic, medic
- Sergiy Stakhovsky (born 1986), Ukrainian tennis player
