= Embassy of Belarus, Kyiv =

Embassy of Belarus in Kyiv
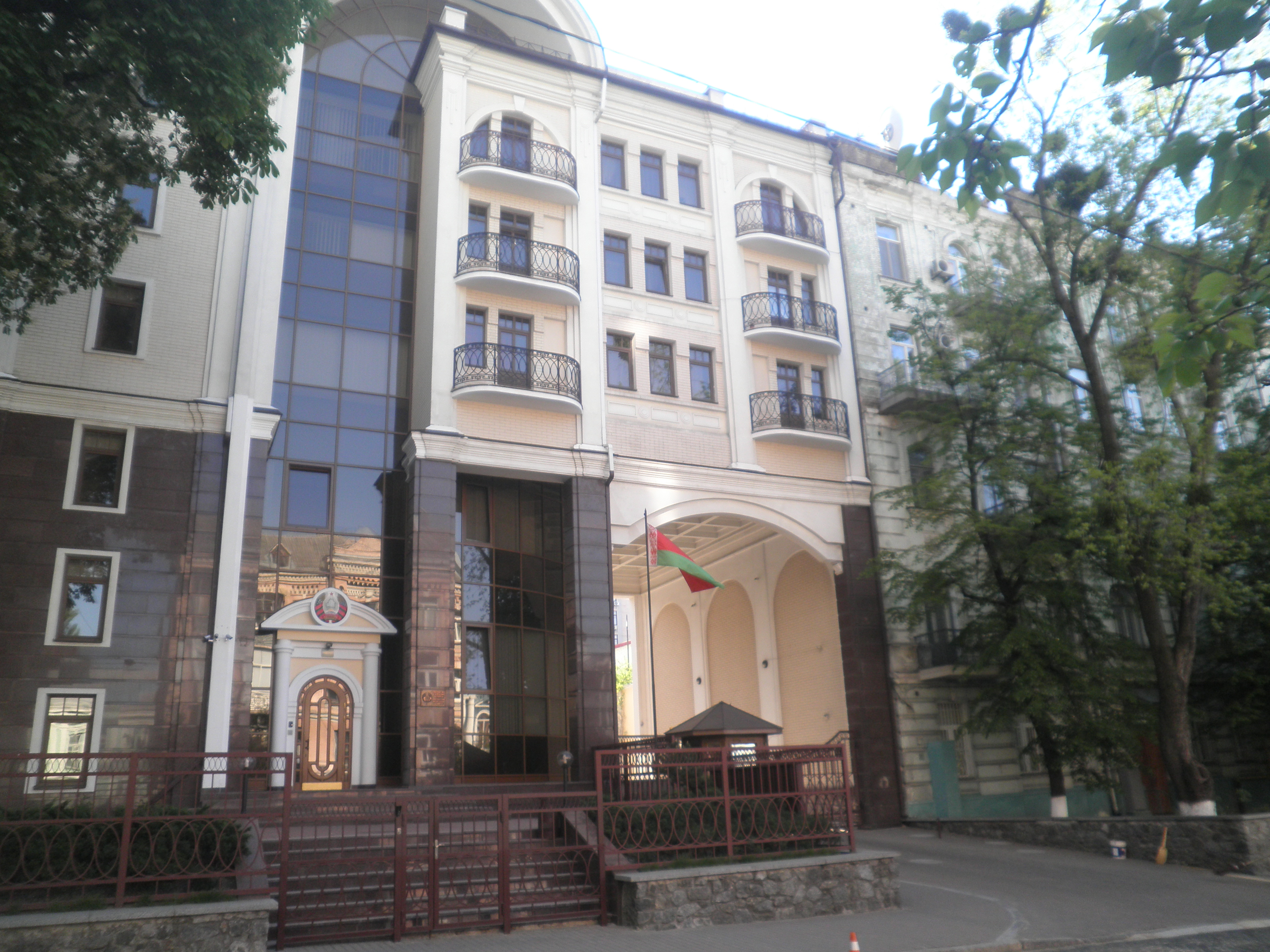
- Location: Kyiv
- Address: Mykhailo Kotsyubynsky St., 3, Kyiv 01030, Ukraine
- Coordinates: 50.4467°N 30.5039°E
- Ambassador: Ihor Sokol

The Embassy of Belarus in Kyiv is the diplomatic mission of Belarus in Ukraine. The embassy is inactive since the Russian invasion of Ukraine in 2022 where Belarus under the regime of Alexander Lukashenko acted as an ally of Russia.

== History ==
Diplomatic relations between Ukraine and Belarus were established on December 27, 1991. The Embassy of Ukraine in Belarus was opened on June 30, 1992. The Belarusian embassy in Kyiv was opened on October 12, 1993.

== History of the embassy building ==
The mansion, on the basis of which a new complex of buildings and structures of the Embassy of the Republic of Belarus in Kyiv was formed, was designed by the famous Kyiv architect Vasyl Osmak and is located in the Shevchenkivskyi district of Kyiv at 3 Mykhailo Kotsyubynskoho Street. It has had its modern name since 1939 in honor of the 75th anniversary of the birth of Ukrainian writer Mykhailo Kotsyubynsky, author of the novel Fata Morgana, and others. The mansion is an architectural monument.

It is a two-storey building with a ground floor, which was previously used as a residential building, where at the end of the 19th and the first half of the 20th century lived Mykhailo Dieterichs – surgeon, doctor of medicine, professor of Kyiv University of St. Vladimir. The building has an r-shaped configuration with access to the courtyard in the right part of the main frontage.

The façades of the building are designed in the Empire style with an asymmetrical composition of the main façade, which highlights the risalit, topped by a triangular pediment with a lunette. Between the risalit and the main volume is a terrace with columns of the Tuscan order. Along the entire main façade is a cornice of simple profile with mutules. The sheets on the second floor are decorated with pilasters and ledges. Panels above the windows are decorated with stucco. The windows are rectangular. The mansion fits in well in terms of storeys, silhouette and style with the surrounding buildings of the street.

The building uses wooden load-bearing elements in the roof and floors. The interiors are designed in the same style as the house itself, with compositional techniques of Art Nouveau style. The fireplace and tiled stove have been preserved. In front of the building, along the entrance to it, there is an elongated square.

== Previous ambassadors ==
1. Arkadź Smolič (1918)
2. Alaksandar Ćvikievič (1919)
3. Vitaliy Kurashyk (1993–2001)
4. Valentin Velichko (2001–2016)
5. Ihor Sokol (2016-)

Entrance of the embassy of Belarus in Kyiv, 2026

== Events ==
- November 21, 2017, Ukraine in response to the announcement of proclaiming the first secretary of the embassy of Ukraine Igor Skvortsov persona non grata, declared the Belarusian diplomat a persona non grata.
- In

== See also ==
- Belarus–Ukraine relations
- Foreign relations of Belarus
- Foreign relations of Ukraine
- Embassy of Ukraine, Minsk
- Diplomatic missions in Ukraine
- Diplomatic missions of Belarus
