= Ihor Yushko =

Ukrainian politician

- Ігор Юшко
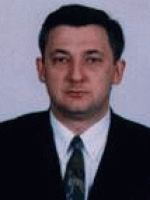
- Yushko in 1998

6th Minister of Finance
- In office 27 December 2001 – 26 November 2002
- President: Leonid Kuchma
- Prime Minister: Anatoliy Kinakh
- Preceded by: Ihor Mityukov
- Succeeded by: Mykola Azarov

Personal details
- Born: 21 August 1961 (age 64) Zhdanov, Donetsk Oblast, Ukrainian SSR, Soviet Union
- Profession: Economist politician

Ihor Olegovich Yushko (Ukrainian: Ігор Олегович Юшко; born 21 August 1961) is a Ukrainian politician who was formerly the Minister of Finance from 2001 to 2002.

== Early life and education ==
Yushko was born on 21 August 1961 in the city of Zhdanov, Ukraine SSR, and he received his diplomas from the Kharkiv Engineering and Economic Institute in 1987 after graduating from the Zhdanov Metallurgical Institute in 1983. Also, he has a certificate from the Michel Institute designating him as a Western European market consultant.

== Career ==
=== Early career ===
Prior to Yushko's ministerial role, he had held several early positions such as a leading engineer at the Azovstal Metallurgical Plant from 1983 to 1992, and first deputy chairman, head of the board of the First Ukrainian International Bank (Donetsk), controlled by SCM Holdings of the famous Ukrainian businessman Rinat Akhmetov since 1992; People's Deputy of Ukraine of the Verkhovna Rada of Ukraine III on Finance and Banking. At the time of the elections, he was a member of the Party of Regional Revival of Ukraine from 1998 to 2002; a member of the Council of the National Bank of Ukraine in 2000.

=== Ministerial career ===
Yushko was named State Secretary of the Ukrainian Ministry of Finance in December 2001, and Anatoliy Kinakh's government soon after appointed him Minister of Finance later that month on the 27th. A later adviser to Viktor Yanukovych, the Ukrainian prime minister. Since 2002, he has been the vice-president of Victor Pinchuk's Interpipe enterprise and head of the supervisory boards of Ukrsotsbank and Oranta insurance company. chairman of the board of the Public Joint Stock Corporation Subsidiary Bank of Sberbank of Russia since November 2008.

=== Post-Ministerial career ===
Yushko was appointed as a non-staff adviser to the head of state on 22 March 2010, by order of Ukraine's President Viktor Yanukovych, and on 24 February 2014, by order of the acting president. In January 2018, he made the decision to depart Sberbank. In connection with the conclusion of the deal, he would resign from his position as Sberbank's chairman of the board on 31 January 2018. Irina Knyazeva, Sberbank's deputy chairman, was named acting board chairman on 1 February.

== Personal life ==
Yushko is married, and had four children.

== Honours ==
During his career, he has been awarded the following honours;

- Merited Economist of Ukraine

Political offices
Preceded by Ihor Mityukov	6th Minister of Finance; 27 December 2001 – 26 November 2002	Succeeded by Mykola Azarov
