= Jaroslav Olesnitsky =

Yaroslav Olesnytskyi
- Ярослав Олесницький
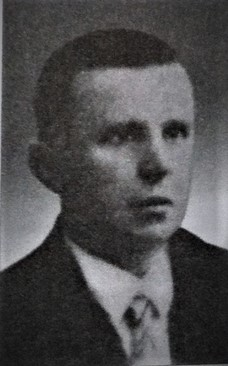
- Olesnitsky, before 1914

Head of the Ukrainian mission in London
- In office 1920–1921
- President: Symon Petliura
- Preceded by: Arnold D. Margolin
- Succeeded by: Roman Smal-Stocki

Personal details
- Born: 1875 Halych, Kingdom of Galicia and Lodomeria
- Died: July 15, 1933 Zolochiv, Lwow Voivodeship
- Education: Lviv University

Yaroslav Ivanovych Olesnytskyi (Ярослав Іванович Олесницький) (born: 1875, Halych, Ivano-Frankivsk Oblast - died July 15, 1933, Zolochiv, Lviv oblast) was a Ukrainian diplomat, politician, and lawyer. Head of the Ukrainian mission to the United Kingdom (1920-1921).

== Career ==
In October 1918 - he was a delegate to the Ukrainian Lviv National Council proclaimed the establishment of the West Ukrainian People's Republic in November 1918.

22 January 1919 - he became an adviser of the Western Ukrainian People's Republic foreign affairs secretariat and was a member of the Western Ukrainian delegation in Kyiv to the proclamation of the union of the Western Ukrainian People's Republic with the Ukrainian People's Republic.

28 January 1919 - he appointed First Counsellor of the diplomatic mission of the Ukrainian People's Republic which began work in London in May 1919.

From September 1919 to January 1920 - he acted as temporary head of the Ukrainian mission in London.

In August 1920 to 1921 - he became head of the Ukrainian mission to the United Kingdom.

From 1921 - he returned to Lviv.

In 1921-1922 - he lectured at the Lviv University.

From 1923 - he practised as a lawyer in Zolochiv.

From 1930 - he represented the Ukrainian National Democratic Alliance to the Sejm of the Polish Republic.
