= Vasilenko =

Vasilenko or Vassilenko (Russian: Василенко) is a Russian adaptation of the Ukrainian surname Vasylenko (Ukrainian: Василенко). Notable people with these surnames include:

- Aleksandr Vasilenko (born 1986), Russian footballer
- Dmitri Vasilenko (1975–2019), Russian artistic gymnast
- Dmitry Vasilenko (politician) (born 1969), Russian politician
- Ivan Vasilenko (1895–1966), Russian writer
- Oleg Vasilenko (born 1973), Russian football manager
- Sergei Vasilenko (1872–1956), Soviet Russian classical composer and conductor
- Gennadiy Vassilenko, Soviet sprint canoer
