= Volodymyr Ohryzko =

Ukrainian diplomat

Volodymyr Ohryzok
- Володимир Огризко
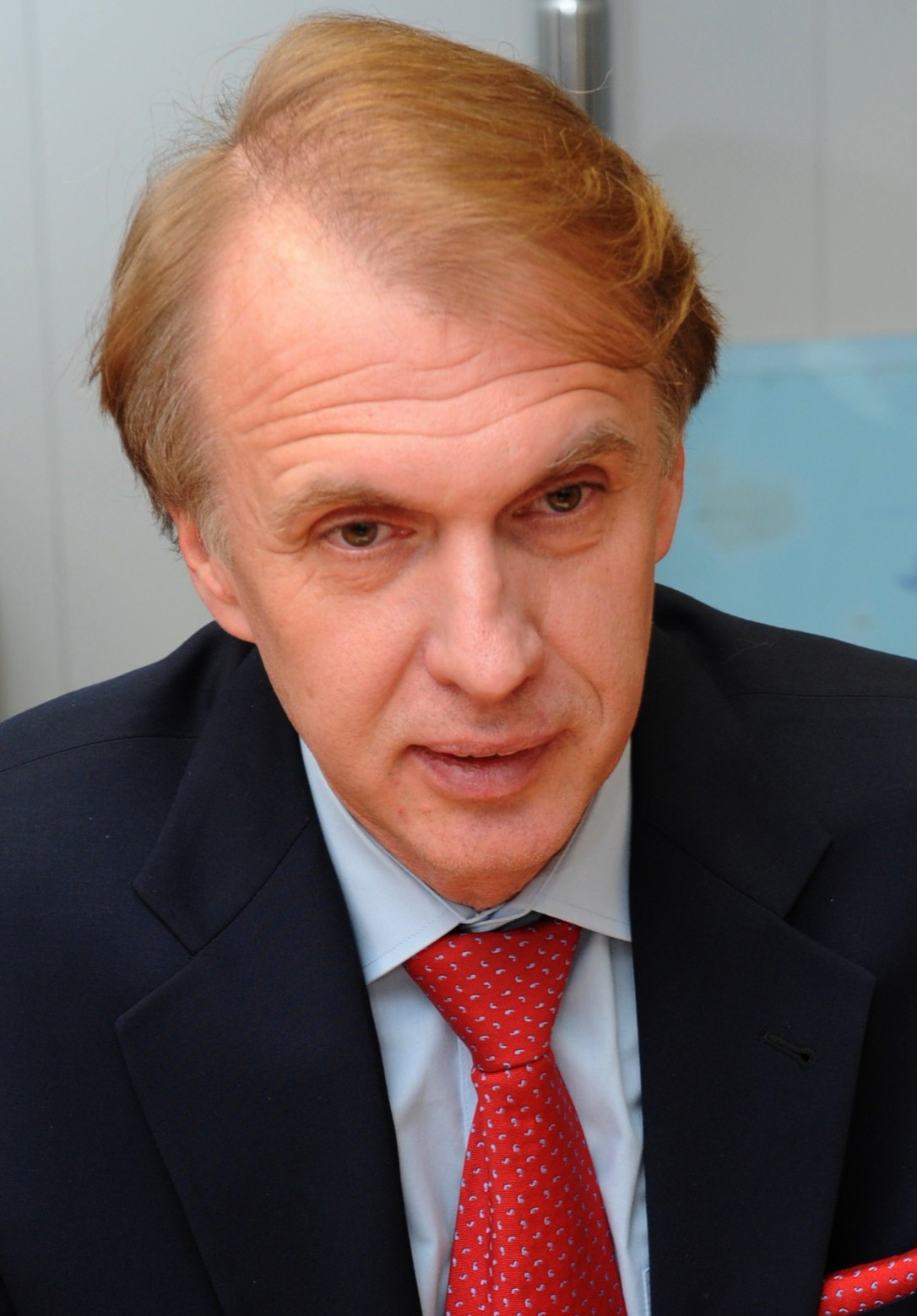
- Ohryzko in 2008

Acting Minister for Foreign Affairs of Ukraine
- In office January 31, 2007 – March 21, 2007
- Preceded by: Borys Tarasyuk
- Succeeded by: Arseniy Yatsenyuk

Minister of Foreign Affairs
- In office December 18, 2007 – March 3, 2009
- Preceded by: Arseniy Yatsenyuk
- Succeeded by: Volodymyr Khandohiy (acting)

Personal details
- Born: April 1, 1956 (age 70) Kyiv, Ukrainian SSR, Soviet Union
- Education: National Taras Shevchenko University of Kyiv

Volodymyr Stanislavovych Ohryzko (Ukrainian: Володимир Станiславович Огризко; born 1 April 1956) is a Ukrainian diplomat. He served as the Minister of Foreign Affairs of Ukraine from December 18, 2007, to March 3, 2009, when he was fired by the Ukrainian Parliament. On March 17, 2009, Ohryzko was appointed First Deputy Secretary of the National Security and Defense Council by President Viktor Yushchenko.

== Early life and career ==
Ohryzko was born on 1 April 1956 in Kyiv, which was then part of the Ukrainian SSR in the Soviet Union. He was born to ethnically Ukrainian parents. In 1978, he graduated from the Faculty of International Relations of Taras Shevchenko National University of Kyiv with a master's degree in international relations. He was also given an emphasis as a researcher-translator from the German language, as he became fluent in German. He later became a Candidate of Hhistorical Sciences from the same institute in historical sciences.

Afterwards, he worked in the Ministry of Foreign Affairs for a long time, with a brief interruption. From 1978 to 1980 he served his first post as an attaché of the Press department of the Ministry for Foreign Affairs of the USSR, and then later became 3rd Secretary in the same department. He served his mandatory military service from 1981 to 1983 in the Armed Forces, before returning to the ministry. By 1991, immediately before the collapse of the Soviet Union, he had become the Leader of Political Analysis and Coordination of the Ministry of Health of the Ukrainian SSR. He was also an advisor for the Ministry of Foreign Affairs from June to July 1991 over how to handle a newly formed Ukraine in foreign affairs in the future.

After Ukraine declared independence, he served as an advisor for the Ministry for Foreign Affairs, and later worked in the embassies of Ukraine in Austria and Germany. From 1996 to 1999 he was then Head of the Department of Foreign Policy and for the Main Directorate for Foreign Policy of the Presidential Administration. Afterwards, he was appointed as Ambassador to Austria and the international organizations resident there until 2004, then Ambassador at Large of the Department of Euro-Atlantic Cooperation, and finally prior to his ministry appointment as First Deputy Minister for Foreign Affairs.

== Resignation ==
Prime Minister Yulia Tymoshenko commented on the resignation: "If there were no crisis, he should have been dismissed long ago. I think all questions have been failed. The systematic work on discrediting the government was performed by Mr. Ohryzko". Tymoshenko said she had applied to the faction of the Bloc of Yulia Tymoshenko (BYuT) at Parliament with a request not to vote for the dismissal of Ohryzko cause that would stir up the political situation in the country. President Viktor Yushchenko called the dismissal of Ohryzko an "untimely and unfounded move from the Verkhovna Rada".

On March 4, 2009, the faction of BYuT at the Verkhovna Rada pledged its preparedness to support reinstatement of Volodymyr Ohryzko as Foreign Minister ("For the sake of preservation of the majority coalition and further effective work of the parliament of Ukraine") if he would apologies to Prime Minister Yulia Tymoshenko and the Cabinet of Ministers for his actions that, in the opinion of the BYuT caused damage to the reputation of Ukraine. 49 MPs out of 156 from the faction of BYuT voted in favour of the dismissal of Ohryzko a day earlier. Despite this, Ohryzko asked President Viktor Yushchenko not to nominate him for the post of Foreign Affairs Minister in the Cabinet of Ministers on March 5, 2009, and accused BYuT of developing its own foreign policy in parallel to the government's foreign policy.

Ohryzko was placed at number 3 on the electoral list of Ukrainian Platform "Sobor" during the 2012 Ukrainian parliamentary election. But on 15 October 2012 the party withdrew itself from the national list of this election.

After the resignation, in 2013, Ohryzko have said that it was a big mistake for Ukraine to pause the association agreement with the European Union.

== Awards ==
- The 3rd Class of the Order of Merit (2006)
- The Cross of Ivan Mazepa (2010)

Political offices
Preceded by Borys Tarasyuk	Minister of Foreign Affairs of Ukraine (acting); 2007	Succeeded by Arseniy Yatsenyuk
Preceded by Arseniy Yatsenyuk	Minister of Foreign Affairs of Ukraine; 2007-2009	Succeeded by Volodymyr Khandohiy (acting)
