= Mykola Stakhovsky =

- Микола Стаховський

Head of the Ukrainian mission in London
- In office January 1919 – September 1919
- President: Symon Petliura
- Succeeded by: Arnold D. Margolin

Personal details
- Born: 22 May 1879 Stetkivtsi, Zhytomyr oblast
- Died: 7 December 1948 (aged 69) Prague
- Education: Warsaw University

Mykola Anatoliiovych Stakhovsky (Микола Ананійович Стаховський) (May 22, 1879 in Stetkivtsi, Zhytomyr oblast — December 7, 1948 in Prague) was a Ukrainian diplomat, politician, and medic. He served as head of the unrecognized Ukrainian mission to the United Kingdom in 1919.

== Education ==
Mykola Stakhovsky graduated from Warsaw University, medical faculty in 1904.

== Career ==
In 1904-1905 — he served with the Red Cross in the northeastern Chinese city of Shenyang.

In 1906 — he published ″Borotba″, an official periodical publication of the Ukrainian Social Democratic Labour Party in Kyiv.

In 1906-1908 — he continued his medical studies in Paris.

In 1909-1914 — he practised medicine in Vinnytsia.

In 1914-1917 — he continued his medical career in Proskuriv.

In May 1917 — after the establishment of the Ukrainian Central Rada, he was appointed provincial commissioner of Podillia.

28 January 1919 to September 1919 — he was as the first head of the diplomatic mission of the Ukrainian People's Republic in London.

In 1920-1922 — he practised medicine in Paris and in Berlin.

In 1924-1939 — he practised medicine in Berehovo, where he was also one of the leading organizers of Ukrainian cultural life.

In 1939-1945 — he practised in Rumburk, Czechoslovakia.

December 7, 1948 — died in Prague and is buried in the Olšany Cemetery.
