= Anatoliy Dron =

Ukrainian diplomat

- Анатолій Дронь
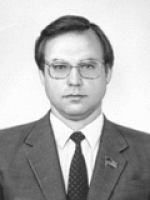

First Deputy Minister of Foreign Affairs
- In office 15 July 2003 – 16 June 2005

Ambassador to Belarus
- In office 3 January 1998 – 15 July 2003
- Preceded by: Volodymyr Zheliba
- Succeeded by: Petro Shapoval

Member of the Verkhovna Rada
- In office 15 May 1990 – 3 January 1998

Personal details
- Born: Anatoliy Andriyovych Dron; 18 March 1945 (age 81) Sedniv, Ukrainian SSR, Soviet Union (now Ukraine)

Anatoliy Andriyovych Dron (Ukrainian: Анатолій Андрійович Дронь; born on 18 March 1945), is a Ukrainian statesman, politician, and diplomat who last served as the First Deputy Minister of Foreign Affairs of Ukraine from 2003 to 2005.

He served as the Ambassador of Ukraine to Belarus from 1998 to 2003. He was also a member of the Parliamentary Assembly of the Council of Europe from 1996 to 1998

He also served as a member of the Verhkovna Rada from 1990 to 1998.

He had been a full member of the Academy of Construction of Ukraine in 1994, AENU in 1996, and is a honored worker of housing and communal services of Ukraine.

== Biography ==
Anatoliy Dron was born on 18 March 1945 in Sedniv in the Chernihiv Oblast.

From 1963 to 1964, he worked as a concrete worker at housebuilding plant No. 1 in Kyiv, and from 1964 to 1967 he served in the Soviet Army. He also worked in the wilderness in the Kazakh SSR. After returning from the army, he graduated from the Faculty of Civil Engineering of the Kyiv Civil Engineering Institute in 1972.

From 1973 to 1976 he was deputy chairman of the executive committee of the Darnitsky district council of Kyiv, and from 1976 to 1987 he worked as an instructor, then head of the urban services sector in the apparatus of the Central Committee of the Communist Party of Ukraine.

He is a candidate of Economic Sciences.

In 1986, he took part in eliminating the consequences of the accident at the Chernobyl nuclear power plant.

In 1988, he was Deputy Minister of Housing and Communal Services of the Ukrainian SSR.

In 1990, during the first alternative parliamentary elections in the Ukrainian SSR, Dron was nominated as a candidate for people's deputies; on 4 March, in the first round, he was elected as a member of parliament, people's deputy of Ukraine of the Verkhovna Rada of Ukraine of the 1st convocation from the Repkinsky electoral district No. 449 of the Chernihiv Oblast, gaining 54.24% of the votes. In parliament he was Deputy Chairman of the Ukrainian Commission on Architecture, Housing and Communal Services. At the same time, from June 1991 to December 1994, he served as Chairman of the State Committee of Ukraine for Housing and Communal Services.

In the parliamentary elections of 1994, reelected to the 2nd convocation, gaining 50.45% of the votes among 6 candidates in the second round of elections.

In 1997, he defended his dissertation for the title of Candidate of Economic Sciences, the topic of his thesis was “The housing market in Ukraine: formation, specifics and development prospects”.

On 3 January 1998, Dron became the Ambassador of Ukraine to Belarus.

On 15 July 2003, he became the First Deputy Minister of Foreign Affairs of Ukraine for relations with the Verkhovna Rada.

On 16 June 2005, he was dismissed as first deputy minister.

On 21 February 2007, he was appointed the Deputy Chairman of the Executive Committee - Executive Secretary of the CIS Executive Committee by Viktor Yushchenko.

On 12 November 2014, he was dismissed by Petro Poroshenko.

== Family ==
He can speak Belarusian, French, and Russian. He is married has a daughter.
