= Zhuravka =

Zhuravka Журавка
- Selo
- Location within Volgograd Oblast Location within Russia
- Coordinates: 50°51′N 43°51′E
- Country: Russia
- Region: Volgograd Oblast
- District: Yelansky District
- Time zone: UTC+4:00

Zhuravka (Russian: Журавка) is a rural locality (a selo) and the administrative center of Zhuravskoye Rural Settlement, Yelansky District, Volgograd Oblast, Russia. The population was 788 as of 2010. There are 5 streets.

== Geography ==
Zhuravka is located on Khopyorsko-Buzulukskaya Plain, 30 km southeast of Yelan (the district's administrative centre) by road. Tersa is the nearest rural locality.
