= Lesia Vasylenko =

Ukrainian lawyer and politician

- Леся Василенко
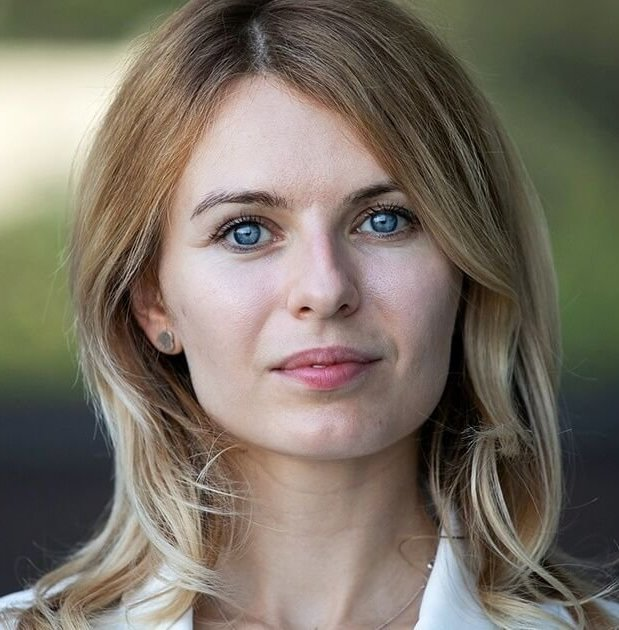
- Vasylenko in 2018

People's Deputy of Ukraine
- Incumbent
- Assumed office 29 August 2019

Personal details
- Born: Lesia Volodymyrivna Vasylenko; 31 March 1987 (age 39) Kyiv, Ukrainian SSR, Soviet Union
- Party: Holos (2019–present)
- Children: 3
- Parent: Volodymyr Vasylenko (father)
- Education: Taras Shevchenko National University of Kyiv; University College London
- Occupation: Lawyer, politician

Lesia Volodymyrivna Vasylenko (Ukrainian: Леся Володимирівна Василенко; born March 31, 1987) is a Ukrainian lawyer and politician serving as a People's Deputy of Ukraine in the 9th Ukrainian Verkhovna Rada. Vasylenko is a member of the Ukrainian permanent delegation to the Parliamentary Assembly of the Council of Europe and president of the Inter-Parliamentary Union's Bureau of Women Parliamentarians. She is the founder of Legal Hundred, a human rights non-governmental organization that provides assistance to servicemen and veterans.

== Early life and education ==
Vasylenko was born in Kyiv to Volodymyr Vasylenko, a human rights activist. She completed a master's degree in international law at the Institute of International Relations of the Taras Shevchenko National University of Kyiv and an LL.M. at University College London.

== Career ==
Vasylenko worked as a corporate lawyer. At the beginning of the Euromaidan revolution in 2013, she protested frequently at the Maidan Nezalezhnosti. After visiting a hospital during the war in Donbas in June 2014, Vasylenko learned that wounded soldiers were unaware of their rights to compensation. Many of the soldiers she spoke with struggled to pay for their medical treatments. In January 2015, she founded Legal Hundred, a human rights non-governmental organization that provides assistance to servicemen and veterans. In 2016, Vasylenko was named by the Kyiv Post as one of the top 30 young under-30 leaders.

In June 2019, it was announced that Vasylenko and Oleksandra Ustinova would be joining the Holos party. In the 2019 Ukrainian parliamentary election, Vasylenko was elected a People's Deputy of Ukraine of the 9th Ukrainian Verkhovna Rada. She is a member of the Verkhovna Rada Committee on Environmental Policy and Nature Management and a Chair of the Subcommittee on Climate Change and Air Protection. Vasylenko is a member of the permanent delegation to the Parliamentary Assembly of the Council of Europe and a First Vice-Chairperson at the Committee on Legal Affairs and Human Rights . Vasylenko is a member of the Ukrainian parliamentary delegation to the Inter-Parliamentary Union where she serves as president of its Bureau of Women Parliamentarians. She is co-chair of the interparliamentary relations group to the United Kingdom and to the French Republic. On 12 December 2019, Vasylenko joined Humane country, an inter-factional association to promote humanistic values and prevent cruelty to animals.

During the 2022 Russian invasion of Ukraine, Vasylenko armed herself with several guns to protect her family. She said on 26 February 2022 that the Russian military was targeting Ukrainian civilians to make the country surrender. On 1 March, Vasylenko evacuated her three children from her home in Kyiv. On 4 March, she said the invasion was the start of World War III.

Vasylenko became one of the initiators of the international #unrussiaUN campaign aimed at excluding Russia from the UN.
