= Volodymyr Zheliba =

Ukrainian politician

- Володимир Желіба
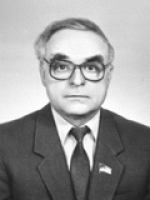

Ambassador to Belarus
- In office 4 March 1992 – 3 January 1998
- Succeeded by: Anatoliy Dron

Member of the Verkhovna Rada
- In office 15 May 1990 – 4 March 1992

Personal details
- Born: Volodymyr Ivaonovcyh Zheliba; 24 February 1934 Zhuravka, Ukrainian SSR, Soviet Union (now Ukraine)
- Died: 21 October 2013 (aged 79)

Volodymyr Ivaonovcyh Zheliba (Ukrainian: Володимир Іванович Желіба; 24 February 1934 - 21 October 2013), was a Ukrainian politician, and diplomat who served as the first ambassador to Belarus from 1992 to 1998.

He has a member of the Verkhovna Rada from 1990 to 1992.

He had also been a member of the Supreme Soviet of the Ukrainian SSR of the 10th and 11th convocations. He was a candidate for membership of the Central Committee of the Communist Party of Ukraine from 1981 to 1986, and was a member of the Central Committee of the Communist Party of Ukraine from 1986 to 1991.

== Biography ==
Volodymyr Zheliba was born on 24 February 1934. In 1952, he entered the Uman Agricultural Institute. He joined the Communist Party of the Soviet Union in 1956. In June 1957, he graduated from the institute, he has been an agronomist and entomologist of the Trostyanetska MTS of the Zalozhtsiv district of the Ternopil Oblast.

In June 1958, he was promoted as the chief agronomist, head of the district agricultural inspection in Zalozhtsivsky district. In April 1961, he was the chief state procurement inspector in the Zalozhtsiv district of the Ternopil region. From April 1962, he was the 2nd secretary of the Zalozhtsi District Committee of the Communist Party of Ukraine; Deputy Secretary of the Party Committee of the Collective Farm and State Farm Administration.

In May 1963, he has been an instructor, consultant of the department of organizational and party work, inspector of the Central Committee of the Communist Party of Ukraine. From November 1971 to April 1973, he was the 1st Deputy Chairman of the executive committee of the Ternopil Regional Council of Workers' Deputies. From April 1973 to September 1978, he was the secretary of the Chernihiv Regional Committee of the Communist Party of Ukraine.

From September 1978 to 1980, he studied at the Academy of Social Sciences under the Central Committee of the CPSU. In March 1980, he has been the chairman of the executive committee of the Kirovohrad Regional Council of People's Deputies. On 4 March 1990, Zheliba was elected a member of parliament, People's Deputy of Ukraine of the 1st convocation to the Verkhovna Rada. At the same time on 6 Apri, he has been the chairman of the Kirovohrad Regional Council of People's Deputies.

From February 1991 to February 1992, he was the chairman of the Kirovohrad Oblast Council and chairman of the Kirovohrad Regional Executive Committee. In February 1992, he has been a member of the commission of the Verkhovna Rada on local self-government development. On 4 March 1992, Zheliba was appointed ambassador to Belarus. On 3 January 1998, he was replaced by his successor Anatoliy Dron. In April 1998, he has been an adviser to the Minister of Emergency Situations and Protection of the Population from the Effects of the Chernobyl Disaster.

He died on 21 October 2013.

== Family ==
He was married and had children.
