= Igor Skvortsov =

Composer

Igor Skvortsov Игорь Скворцов
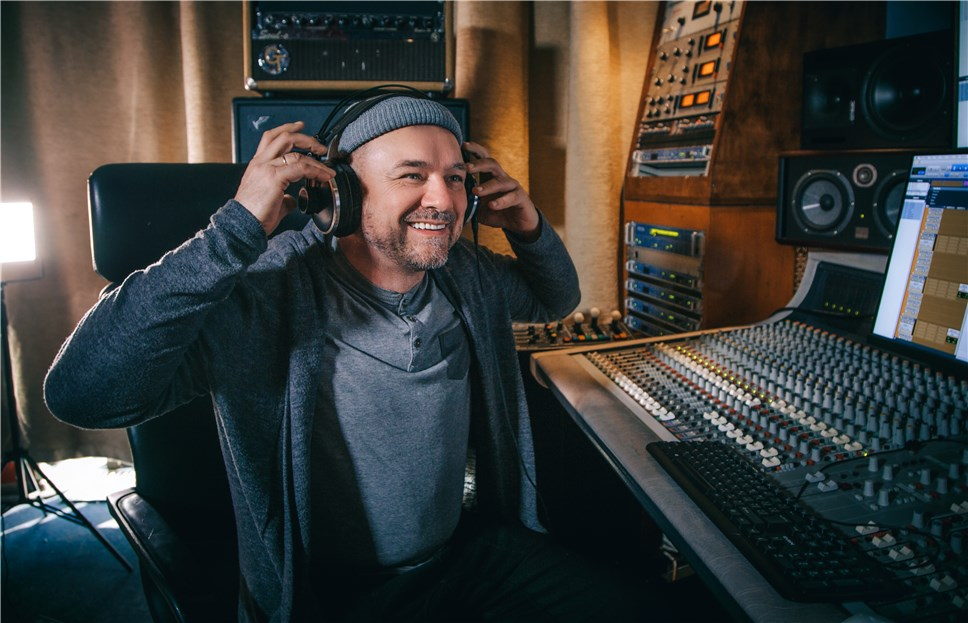
- Igor Skvortsov in 2021

Background information
- Born: July 1964 (age 60); Soviet Union
- Occupation: Composer

Igor Skvortsov (Note: Russian: Игорь Скворцов, romanized: Igor Skvortsov) (born July 1964) is a composer of neoclassical, ambient, progressive and new-age music.

== Biography ==
Igor Skvortsov was born in July 1964 in Soviet Union.

== Music style ==
Igor Skvortsov is a composer of neoclassical, ambient, progressive and new-age music. In FilmFreeway, his music is described as "a reflection of feelings, emotions". Although, as a neoclassical composer, Igor Skvortsov creates "his own universe of subtle and mesmerizing sounds", "his music is a story about each of us", based on FilmFreeway.

== Discography ==
2025:

- Singles:

- Lullaby

2024:

- Singles:

- Perception
- Memory
- Hyperborea
- Gratitude is inside us

2023:

- Singles:

- Composure
- Sympathy
- Serenity

2022:

- Singles:

- Ascension
- Consent
- Disavowal
- Immersion

2021:

- Singles:

- Meekness
- Self-Acceptance
- Life
- Stream
- Solitude
- Expectation (Jody Wisternoff Remix)
- Voyage
- Expectation (orchestra version)
- Inspiration
- Distance
- Forgiveness
- Thought
- Transformation

- Album "TRANSFORMATION" (2021) (includes 3 singles: Expectation, Time and Spring Time)

== Awards ==
In 2022, music video “EXPECTATION” received numerous awards at International Film Festivals across the European, Australian and American continents, including: the Best Composer at Arthouse Festival of Beverly Hills in USA, the Best Music Video at Milan Gold Awards in Italy, the Winner at Film in Focus in Romania, the Winner at Best Music Video Awards in UK, the Winner at Emerald Peacock International Film Festival in Russia and the Best Composer at Sydney Indie Short Festival in Australia.
