= Arnold Margolin =

Ukrainian diplomat

- Арнольд Марголін
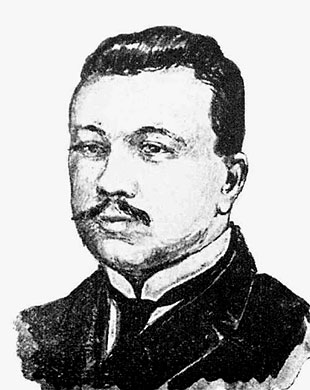

Head of the Ukrainian mission in London
- In office 1919–1920
- President: Symon Petliura
- Preceded by: Mykola Stakhovsky
- Succeeded by: Jaroslav Olesnitsky

Personal details
- Born: November 16 [O.S. November 4] 1877 Kyiv
- Died: October 29, 1956 (aged 78) Washington DC
- Education: Kyiv University

Arnold Davydovych Margolin (Ukrainian: Арнольд Давидович Марґолін; November 16 [O.S. November 4] 1877 – October 29, 1956) was a Ukrainian diplomat, lawyer, active participant in Ukrainian and Jewish community and political affairs; attorney who became world-famous as the defense counsel for Mendel Beilis in the notorious Jewish blood libel trial in Kyiv from 1911 to 1913. He was a justice of the Supreme Court of Appeals of Ukraine, Undersecretary of State of Ukraine and a member of the Ukrainian delegation to the Versailles Peace Conference between 1918 and 1919.

== Education ==
Arnold Davydovich Margolin graduated from University of Kyiv, faculty of Law (1900).

== Career ==
Arnold D. Margolin participated in many political trials as counsel for the defense. In 1904 - he was one of the defenders of Jewish interests in the Homel pogrom trial. From 1905–1908, in many other pogrom trials. He was one of the defenders in the trial of Mendel Beilis.

His father, David Margolin, was one of the leaders of the Jewish community in Kyiv for decades and one of the most prominent pioneers of the steamer business, and many branches of industries in Ukraine. Mr. David Margolin has been president and director of many industrial corporations in which Arnold Margolin also participated as a member of the board of directors and legal adviser. David Margolin built the largest Talmud Torah in Kyiv and presented it to the Jewish community of Kyiv by his own means.

Before the 1917 February Revolution in the Russian Empire, he was Secretary General of the South Russian Branch of the Union. In 1918, he was appointed to the Supreme Court of the Ukrainian People's Republic and subsequently to the State Senate of the Ukrainian State. After the restoration of the Ukrainian People's Republic at the end of 1918, he became Assistant Minister of Foreign Affairs and a member of the Ukrainian delegation to the 1919-1920 Paris Peace Conference.

In November 1919 — he was appointed to head of the diplomatic mission in London, and on 29 January 1920 he arrived in London to take up his post. On 16 July 1920 he tendered his resignation. He prepared a case for the admission of the Ukrainian People's Republic to the League of Nations.

In 1922 — he emigrated to the United States where he practiced as a lawyer and lectured in history at several universities. Arnold Margolin was active in several Ukrainian émigré scholarly institutions and promoted Ukrainian-Jewish mutual understanding.

He served on the staff of the U.S. Office of Strategic Services during World War II.

In 1946, he wrote a long letter to The Washington Post that criticized President Leo Krzycki by name and executive secretary George Pirinsky for expressing their personal, pro-Soviet opinions as representing the American Slav Congress, which represented some seven million Slavic-Americans. "...Most important leaders of the American Slav Congress find many things in Soviet Russia superior to the situation in America," he wrote. He noted the "close contact" between the USA-based American Slav Congress and the USSR-based All-Slav Committee. "By claiming that they speak in the name of the whole American Slav Congress, its leaders created an absolutely wrong impression about the real political trends and affiliations prevailing among the overwhelming majority of the American Slav population.

From 1948 — 1949 — dean of the Army's European Command Intelligence School for Army.

From 1954 — 1955 — he was the first president and professor of law at the Ukrainian Technical Institute in New York City.

Margolin died of injuries sustained when he was struck by a car near his home in Silver Spring.

== Publications ==
- The Criminal Law (Articles and sketches) Kyiv, 1907
- Lombroso's Role and Significance in the Evolution of View on Crime and Punishment Kyiv, 1908
- The Liquidation Period (Sketches, Addresses, Appeals). Petrograd, 1911
- The Trial of A. D. Margolin Petrograd, 1916
- The Jews of Eastern Europe (1926),
- From a political diary; Russia, the Ukraine, and America, 1905-1945 by A. D Margolin (1946)
- Ukraine and Policy of the Entente (Zapiski evreia i grazhdanina) by A. D Margolin
- Osnovy gosudarstvennogo ustroĭstva SShA by A. D Margolin
- Ukraine and policy of the Entente by A. D Margolin (1977)
- Osnovnyia cherty novago ugolovnago ulozhenīia kriticheskīĭ ocherk s predislovīem ... R. Garro, Ėlement chuvstva v institutia nakazanīia i drugīia stat'i by A. D Margolin
- Aperçu critique des traits fondamentaux du nouveau Code pénal russe : rapport lu à la Société juridique près l'Université de Kieff le 20 septembre 1903 by A. D Margolin
- Derzhavnyĭ ustriĭ Spoluchenykh Shtativ Ameryky by A. D Margolin
- V polosia likvidatsīi : ocherki, riechi, kassatsīonnyia zhaloby by A. D Margolin
- Razskazy Pis'ma iz Anglīi by A. D Margolin
