= Serhiy Komisarenko =

Ukrainian scientist, politician, and diplomat

- Сергій Комісаренко
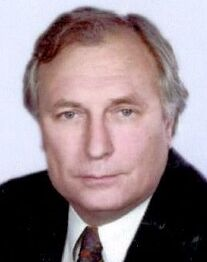
- Komisarenko in 1990

Ambassador of Ukraine to the United Kingdom
- In office 1992–1997
- President: Leonid Kravchuk; Leonid Kuchma
- Preceded by: Roman Smal-Stocki
- Succeeded by: Volodymyr Vasylenko

Personal details
- Born: 9 July 1943 (age 83) Ufa
- Education: Kyiv Medical Institute

Serhiy Vasyliovych Komisarenko (Ukrainian: Сергій Васильович Комісаренко; born July 9, 1943) is a Ukrainian scientist, politician, and diplomat. He was a self-nominated candidate in the 2004 Ukrainian presidential election, and is chairman of the O. Palladin Institute of Biochemistry of the National Academy of Sciences of Ukraine.

== Scientific career ==
Komisarenko received an M.D. degree in 1966 from the Kyiv Medical Institute and a Ph.D. in biochemistry from Kyiv University in 1970. He worked at the Palladin Institute of Biochemistry, Ukrainian Academy of Sciences from 1969 to 1992, becoming its director in 1992. He became an academician of the Ukrainian National Academy of Sciences in 1991, and of the Ukrainian Academy of Medical Sciences in 1993.

His main scientific interests are in immunochemical analysis of peptide and protein antigenic structure. He was the founder of molecular immunology studies in Ukraine; his team was the first in the former Soviet Union to implement immunoenzyme methods, monoclonal antibody technique, and flow cytofluorimetry in research. He was the head of the Ukrainian Scientific Immunology Program; under his guidance it was found that low-dose radiation from Chernobyl fall-out decreased the number and activity of natural killer cells in humans. This immune suppression he named "Chernobyl AIDS".

He is president of the Ukrainian Biochemistry Society, president and a founder of the Ukrainian International Institute of Peace and Democracy, and a member of the interagency committee in charge of new biotechnologies. He has been the editor-in-chief of the Ukrainian Biochemical Journal from 1989 to 1992, and since 1999.

== Political career ==
Komisarenko was Deputy Prime Minister of Ukraine from 1990 to 1992, responsible for public health, science and technology, education, culture, and religion. He was the first Ambassador Plenipotentiary to the United Kingdom from 1992 to 1998, and to Ireland from 1995 to 1998. In 1999, he was campaign manager for presidential candidate Evgen Marchuk.

His 2004 presidential election program included a guarantee of a state monopoly for the manufacturing of tobacco and alcohol products, and gradual political reform after the 2006 parliamentary elections. In his program, he paid great attention to the development of science and education. In international relations he favours a policy of neutrality.

Since 1999, he has been the first vice-chairman of the Ukrainian Board of Peace. In 2007 President Yushchenko appointed him Chairman of the Commission on Biosafety and Biosecurity at the National Security and Defense Council of Ukraine.
