= Petro Shapoval =

Ukrainian diplomat

- Петро Шаповал

Ambassador to Belarus
- In office 18 August 2003 – 18 August 2005
- Preceded by: Anatoliy Dron
- Succeeded by: Valentyn Nalyvaichenko

Ambassador to Kyrgyzstan
- In office 30 November 2000 – 18 August 2003
- Preceded by: Viktor Bohartyr
- Succeeded by: Oleksandr Bozhko

Governor of Chernihiv Oblast
- In office 29 October 1991 – 8 August 1996
- President: Leonid Kuchma
- Preceded by: Valentyn Melnychuk
- Succeeded by: Mykhailo Kaskevych

Personal details
- Born: Petro Dmytrovych Shapoval; 1 March 1948 (age 78) Zhovtneve, Ukrainian SSR, Soviet Union (now Ukraine)

Petro Dmytrovych Shapoval (Ukrainian: Петро Дмитрович Шаповал; born on 1 March 1948), is a Ukrainian statesman, politician, diplomat who last served as an ambassador to Belarus from 2003 to 2005.

He also served as the ambassador to Kyrgyzstan from 2000 to 2003.

Shapoval also served as the Governor of Chernihiv Oblast from 1995 to 1998.

== Biography ==
Petro Shapoval was born on 1 March 1948 to a peasant family in Zhovtneve, now the village of Rozhdestvenske, Korop district, Chernihiv Oblast.

In 1967, he graduated from the Nizhyn School of Agricultural Mechanization, Chernihiv Region. The same year, he became an assistant foreman of the tractor brigade of the collective farm "October Revolution" of Zhovtneve.

From 1967 to 1969, he served in the Soviet Army. Between 1969 and 1972, he was a teacher of industrial training at the secondary school of Korop district, Chernihiv Oblast.

In 1970, he joined as a member of the CPSU.

From 1972 to June 1977, he was the head of the garage, the head of the department of the Horodnya motor vehicle enterprise (ATP) in Horodnya, Chernihiv Oblast.

From June 1977 to June 1981, he was the chairman of the executive committee of the Horodnya City Council of People's Deputies of the Chernihiv Region. At the same time, he graduated by correspondence from the Kyiv Institute of National Economy as an economist.

From June 1981 to May 1985, he was the deputy chairman of the executive committee of the Horodnya District Council of People's Deputies of the Chernihiv Region.

From May 1985 to October 1986, he was the deputy Head of the Department of Agriculture and Food Industry of the Chernigov Regional Party Committee.

From October 1986 to March 1990, he was the 1st secretary of the Shchor District Committee of the Communist Party of Chernihiv Region. On 27 March, he became the deputy chairman of the Chernihiv Regional Council of People's Deputies.

On 25 June 1990, he became the 1st Deputy Chairman of the executive committee of the Chernihiv Regional Council of People's Deputies.

From April to August 1991, he was the first secretary of the Chernihiv Regional Committee of the Communist Party of Ukraine.

From October 1991 to April 1992, he was the 1st Deputy Head of the Regional Department of Agriculture of the executive committee of the Chernihiv Regional Council of People's Deputies.

From April 1992 to April 1993, he was the 1st deputy head of the Department of Agriculture of the Chernihiv Oblast State Administration.

From April 1993 to July 1994, he was 1st Deputy Head of the Department of Agriculture and Food of the Chernihiv Oblast State Administration as Chairman of the Chernihiv Regional Committee "Oblagrotechservice".

In July 1994, he was the chairman of the Chernihiv Oblast Council and the chairman of the executive committee of the Chernihiv Oblast Council.

On July 3, 1995, Shapoval became the Governor of Chernihiv Oblast. On 30 April 1998, he left office.

On 30 November 2000, Shapoval was appointed to Ambassador of Ukraine to Kyrgyzstan. On 7 July 2003, he was dismissed from that position. On 18 August, he was appointed ambassador of Ukraine to Belarus. On 11 September, he met with the Belarusian delegates, where he met the Belarusian Foreign Minister, Sergey Martynov, focusing on further development of bilateral cooperation between the two countries. He received credentials in Minsk on 23 October.

On 18 August 2005, he was dismissed by Ukrainian President Viktor Yuschenko, and had been replaced by Valentyn Nalyvaichenko on 30 December. During that time as ambassador in 2005, there has been a controversy sparked upon Shapoval's return to Kyiv, that Belarusian President Alexander Lukashenko, invited to work him in Belarus. Shapoval was seen as tolerant of Lukashenko’s regime, as notes that during the recent scandal with the arrest of five Ukrainian citizens in Minsk, he did not make a single public statement of protest and did not even contact the Belarusian authorities with requests for their release.

In 2006, Shapoval was elected as a member of the Chernihiv Oblast council. He was the Chairman of the Standing Committee on Interregional and Cross-Border Cooperation.

Since 2010, he is the Chairman of the Chernihiv regional branch of the All-Ukrainian public organization "Strength and Honor".

== Family ==
He is married and has two children.
