= Volodymyr Khandohiy =

Ukrainian diplomat and politician

- Володимир Хандогій
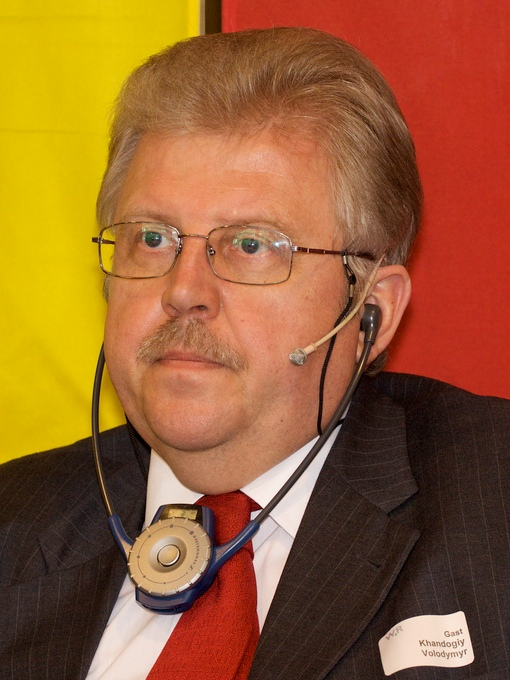
- Khandohiy in 2009

Ambassador of Ukraine to the United Kingdom
- In office 2010–2015
- Preceded by: Ihor Kharchenko
- Succeeded by: Natalia Galibarenko

Acting Minister for Foreign Affairs of Ukraine
- In office 3 March 2009 – 9 October 2009
- Preceded by: Volodymyr Ohryzko
- Succeeded by: Petro Poroshenko

Ambassador of Ukraine to Belgium and Luxembourg
- In office 2000–2005
- Preceded by: Kostiantyn Hryshchenko
- Succeeded by: Yaroslav Koval

Ambassador of Ukraine to the Netherlands
- In office 2000–2002
- Preceded by: Kostiantyn Hryshchenko
- Succeeded by: Dmytro Markov

Ambassador of Ukraine to Canada
- In office 1998–2000
- Preceded by: Volodymyr Furkalo
- Succeeded by: Yuriy Shcherbak

Personal details
- Born: 21 February 1953 (age 73) Cherkasy, Ukrainian SSR, Soviet Union
- Education: National Taras Shevchenko University of Kyiv

Volodymyr Dmytrovych Khandohiy (Ukrainian: Володимир Дмитрович Хандогій) is a Ukrainian diplomat and politician. Khandohiy was the acting Minister of Foreign Affairs of Ukraine for six months in 2009.

== Biography ==
Volodymyr Khandohiy graduated from the National Taras Shevchenko University of Kyiv and started his diplomatic career in 1975. Khandohiy is a former Ambassador to Belgium and Luxembourg (2000-2005) and the Netherlands (2000-2002) and a former Head of the Mission of Ukraine to NATO (2000-2005). Between 1995 and 1998, and from 27 December 2005 till his appointment as acting Minister, he was a Deputy Foreign Minister.

Khandohiy was the acting Minister of Foreign Affairs of Ukraine, after (on 3 March 2009) his predecessor Volodymyr Ohryzko was dismissed by the Ukrainian Parliament. On 9 October 2009 this parliament appointed Petro Poroshenko as foreign minister.

In 2012 he said that Yevhen Khytrov was a victim of bad refereeing at the 2012 London Olympics.

Khandohiy is married, and has a son and daughter.

Political offices
| Preceded by Volodymyr Ohryzko | acting Minister of Foreign Affairs of Ukraine; 2009 | Succeeded by Petro Poroshenko |
