= Ihor Mityukov =

Ukrainian diplomat (1952–2026)

Ihor Mitiukov
- Ігор Мітюков
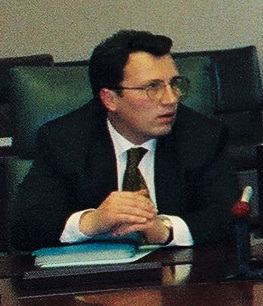
- Mitiukov in 1995

Minister of Finance of Ukraine
- In office 26 February 1997 – 27 December 2001
- President: Leonid Kuchma
- Preceded by: Valentyn Koronevsky
- Succeeded by: Ihor Yushko

Ambassador of Ukraine to the United Kingdom
- In office 2002–2005
- President: Viktor Yushchenko
- Preceded by: Volodymyr Vasylenko
- Succeeded by: Ihor Kharchenko

Ambassador of Ukraine to the European Union
- In office 1995–1997
- President: Leonid Kuchma
- Preceded by: Volodymyr Vasylenko
- Succeeded by: Borys Hudyma

Personal details
- Born: 27 September 1952 Kiev, Ukrainian SSR, Soviet Union
- Died: 7 April 2026 (aged 73)
- Education: Kyiv University

Ihor Oleksandrovych Mitiukov (Ukrainian: Ігор Олександрович Мітюков; 27 September 1952 – 7 April 2026) was a Ukrainian diplomat and politician, who was Ambassador Extraordinary and Plenipotentiary of Ukraine, and the Minister of Finance of Ukraine (1997–2001). He was the Head of Kyiv office and a Managing Director of Morgan Stanley from March 2008 until his death in 2026.

== Education ==
Ihor Mitiukov graduated from Taras Shevchenko National University of Kyiv in 1975, the cybernetics department; Institute of Economy, Academy of Sciences of Ukraine. (PhD).

== Career ==
Mityukov held various positions prior to 1990, including at Agrarian-Industrial Bank Ukraina, before being appointed its Deputy Governor.

In 1994, he served as Deputy Governor of the National Bank of Ukraine and Vice-Prime Minister of Ukraine for banking and finance.

From 1995 to 1997, Mityukov was Ukraine's Special Representative to the European Union in Brussels, with Vice-Prime Ministerial status.

Mityukov served as the Minister of Finance of Ukraine from 1997 to 2001.

From 2002 to 2005, Mityukov served as the Ambassador Extraordinary and Plenipotentiary of Ukraine in the United Kingdom and represented Ukraine in the International Maritime Organization, as well.

Mityukov was an Independent Non-Executive Director at Ferrexpo Plc from 14 June 2007, and the Head of Kyiv office and Managing Director of Morgan Stanley from March 2008.

== Death ==
Mityukov died on 7 April 2026, at the age of 73.
