= Ihor Likhovy =

Ukrainian public figure

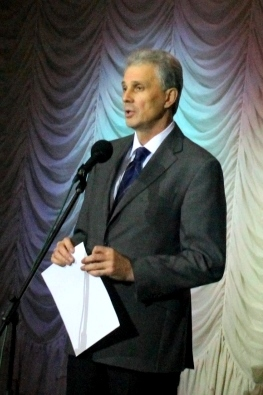
Igor Likhovy in 2015

Ihor Dmytrovych Likhovy (Ukrainian: І́гор Дми́трович Ліхови́й, born 12 June 1957) is a Ukrainian statesman and public figure, diplomat, museologist, historian, culturologist, Minister of Culture and Tourism of Ukraine (2005–2006), Ambassador Extraordinary and Plenipotentiary of Ukraine to the Republic of Belarus (2007–2010). In 1997, he was awarded the title Honored Worker of Ukraine Culture.

== Early life ==
Likhovy was born on 12 June 1957 in the village of Vrublivka, which was located within Zhytomyr Oblast in the Ukrainian SSR. In 1979, he graduated from Odesa National Polytechnic University with a degree in electrical engineering. Afterwards, he worked as a workshop power engineer at the Kaniv Electromechanical Plant "Magnit".

== Political career ==
In 1985, he started entering politics, becoming instructor and then head of the department in the Kaniv City Committee. From 1987 to 1989 he was then First Deputy Chairman of the Kaniv City Executive Committee. Afterwards, from 1987 to 2002 he served as a deputy on the Kaniv City Council of People's Deputies, in conjunction with being a deputy of the Cherkasy Regional Council from 1990 to 1994.

On 5 October 2005 he was appointed Minister of Culture of Ukraine in the government of Yuriy Yekhanurov by President Viktor Yushchenko. After Viktor Yanukovych took power as Prime Minister in 2006 after the 2006 Ukrainian parliamentary election, the Party of Regions requested that Yekhanurov's previous ministers be recalled. This was approved by the Verkhovna Rada on 1 November 2006. However, he was given the position of Head of the Service for the Preservation of National Cultural Heritage of the Secretariat by the President.

From 6 February 2007 to 24 February 2010 — Ambassador of Ukraine to the Republic of Belarus.

From December 17, 2014, to April 20, 2016 — First Deputy Minister of Culture of Ukraine.

== Scientific career ==
In 1989–2005 he was the director of the Shevchenko National Preserve in Kaniv, a researcher at the Institute of History of the National Academy of Sciences of Ukraine (2004–2005).

Also Ihor Likhovy is the author of numerous scientific works about Taras Shevchenko, problems of development of national culture, on museology and protection of monuments as well.

== Links ==
"Igor Likhovy: "I am most proud of the fact that I participated in the formation of Ukrainian Independence"" (in Ukrainian). Ukrainian literature newspaper. 27 June 2017.
