= Natalia Galibarenko =

Ukrainian diplomat

- Наталія Галібаренко
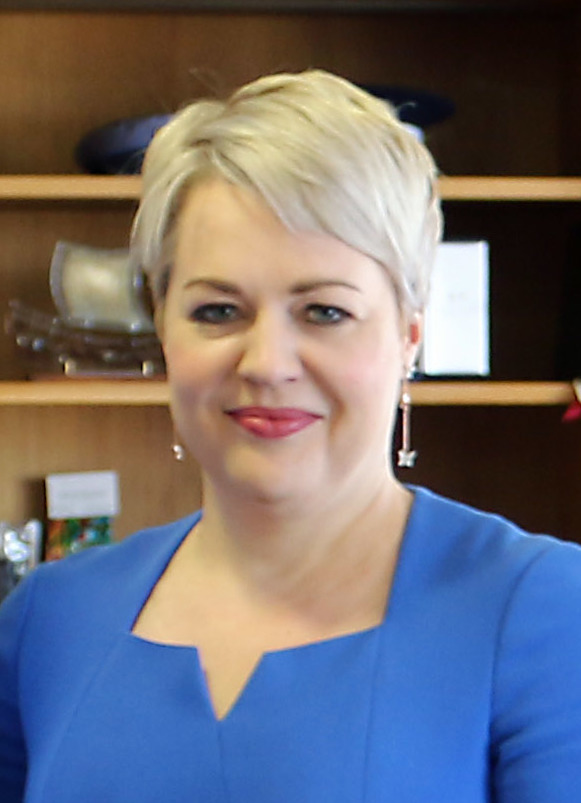
- Galibarenko in 2018

Ambassador of Ukraine to the United Kingdom
- In office 2015–2020
- President: Petro Poroshenko; Volodymyr Zelenskyy
- Prime Minister: Arseniy Yatsenyuk; Volodymyr Groysman; Oleksiy Honcharuk
- Preceded by: Volodymyr Khandohiy
- Succeeded by: Vadym Prystaiko

First Deputy Minister for Foreign Affairs of Ukraine
- In office 2014–2015

Personal details
- Born: 12 May 1978 (age 48) Kyiv
- Education: National Taras Shevchenko University of Kyiv

Natalia Galibarenko (born 1978) is a Ukrainian diplomat, and a former Ukrainian Ambassador Extraordinary and Plenipotentiary to the UK.

== Education ==
Natalia Galibarenko graduated from Taras Shevchenko National University of Kyiv, master's degree in International Relations; Languages: English and Spanish.

== Career ==
From 2000 – Attaché, Third Secretary of the Cabinet of the Minister for Foreign Affairs of Ukraine, Third and Second Secretary of the Mission of Ukraine to the European Union.

2006-2007 – Chief Consultant of the Main Office for Foreign Policy, European and Euro-Atlantic Integration Processes of the Presidential Administration of Ukraine.

2007-2009 – Head of Section for Deputy Minister for Foreign Affairs of Ukraine.

2009-2012 – Head of Division, Deputy Director of the Directorate General – Head of Division for Co-operation in Political, Security and Defence Fields of the EU Directorate General, Ministry of Foreign Affairs of Ukraine.

2012-2014 – Deputy Head of the Permanent Mission of Ukraine to the International Organizations in Vienna.

2014-2015 – First Deputy Minister for Foreign Affairs of Ukraine. She participated in numerous bilateral and multilateral negotiations of Ukraine, including in framework of the EU, Council of Europe, OSCE and other international organizations.

From 2015 — Ambassador Extraordinary and Plenipotentiary of Ukraine to the United Kingdom of Great Britain and Northern Ireland, Permanent Representative to the IMO. Vadym Prystaiko was appointed as her successor by President Volodymyr Zelenskyy on 20 July 2020.
