= Volodymyr Vasylenko =

Ukrainian diplomat (1937–2023)

- Володимир Василенко
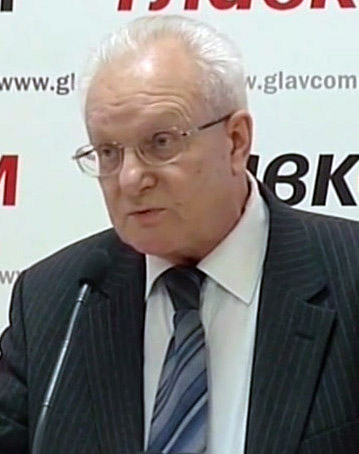
- Vasylenko in 2014

Judge of the International Criminal Tribunal for the former Yugoslavia
- In office 2002–2005

Ambassador of Ukraine to the United Kingdom
- In office 1998–2002
- President: Leonid Kuchma
- Preceded by: Serhiy Komisarenko
- Succeeded by: Ihor Mityukov

Ambassador of Ukraine to the European Union
- In office 1995–1997
- President: Leonid Kuchma
- Succeeded by: Ihor Mityukov

Personal details
- Born: Volodymyr Andriyovych Vasylenko; 16 January 1937 Kiev, Ukrainian SSR, Soviet Union
- Died: 9 October 2023 (aged 86)
- Children: Lesia Vasylenko
- Education: Kiev University

Volodymyr Andriyovych Vasylenko (Ukrainian: Володи́мир Андрі́йович Василе́нко; 16 January 1937 – 9 October 2023) was a Ukrainian diplomat who twice served as Ambassador Extraordinary and Plenipotentiary of Ukraine.

== Education ==
Volodymyr Vasylenko graduated from Taras Shevchenko National University of Kyiv in 1959.

== Career ==
From 1972 to 1992, he was a scientific consultant of the Ministry of Foreign Affairs of Ukraine for law issues.

In 1989, he took part in the development of a legal basis for economic independence of Ukraine.

In 1990, he was a consultant of the Supreme Soviet of the Ukrainian SSR (the parliament of the Ukrainian SSR, then part of the Soviet Union), prepared the first draft of the Declaration of State Sovereignty of Ukraine.

In 1992, he was appointed Ambassador to the Benelux countries and also the Representative of Ukraine to the European Union and NATO.

From 1998 to 2002, Vasylenko was Ambassador Extraordinary and Plenipotentiary of Ukraine to Great Britain and Northern Ireland.

Between 1991 and 2009, he served as an expert, advisor, and member of the delegation of Ukraine in the UN General Assembly.

From 2001 to 2005, Vasylenko served as a UN General Assembly judge in the International Criminal Tribunal for the Former Yugoslavia.

From 2006 to 2010, he was the Representative of Ukraine to the United Nations Human Rights Council.

In 2014, Vasylenko was head of the Commission to Investigate Human Rights Violations in Ukraine.

== Death ==
Vasylenko died on 9 October 2023 at the age of 86.
