= Belarus–Ukraine relations =

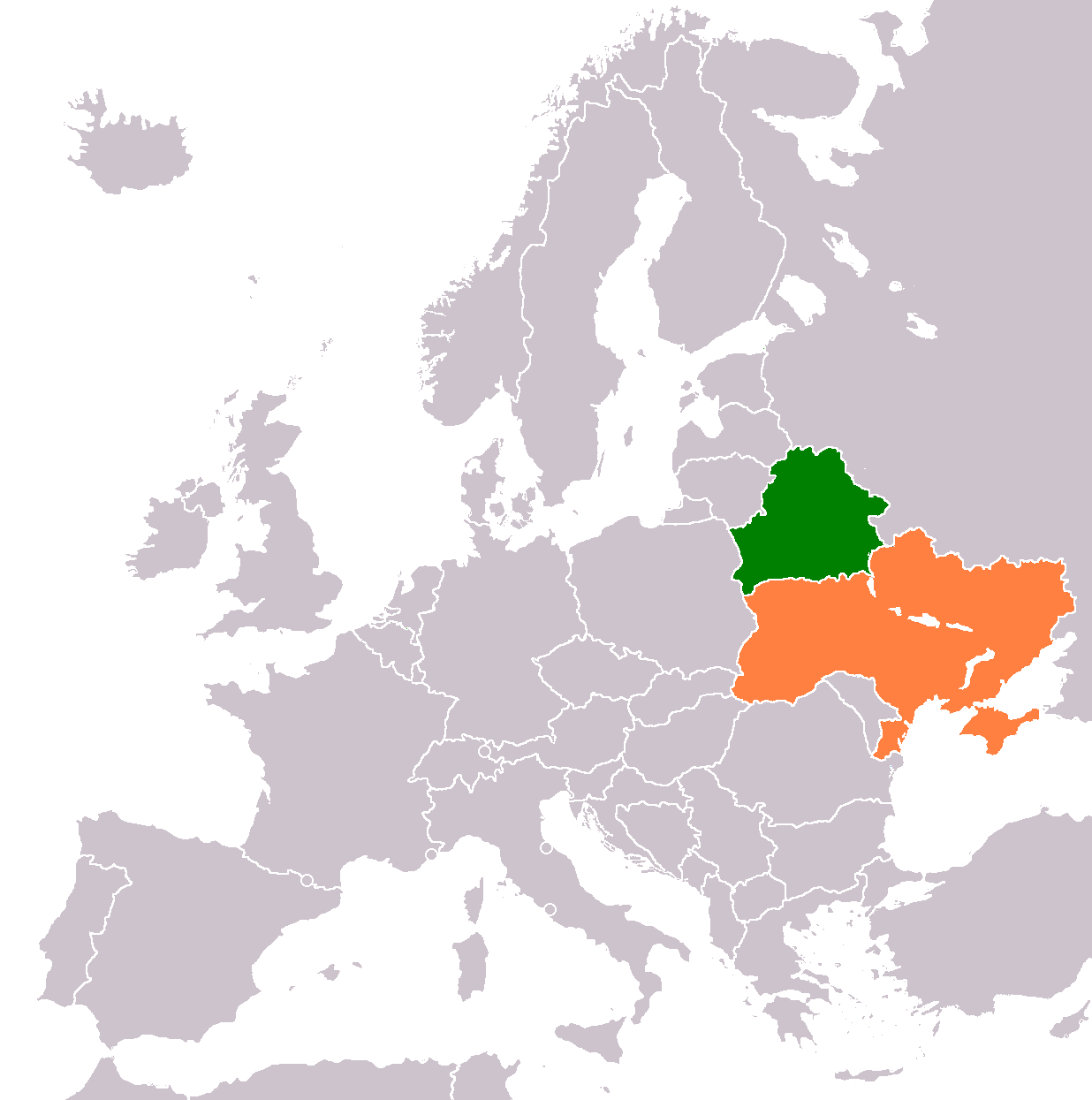

- Belarus: Ukraine

Belarus and Ukraine both are full members of the Baku Initiative and Central European Initiative. In 2020, during the Belarusian protests against president Lukashenko, the relationship between Ukraine and Belarus began to deteriorate, after the Ukrainian government criticized Belarusian president Alexander Lukashenko. In the waning days of 2021, the relationship between both countries rapidly deteriorated, culminating in a full-scale invasion on 24 February 2022. Belarus has allowed the stationing of Russian troops and equipment in its territory and its use as a springboard for offensives into northern Ukraine but has denied the presence of Belarusian troops in Ukraine. Even though part of the Russian invasion was launched from Belarus, Ukraine did not break off diplomatic relations with Belarus (unlike with Russia), but remain frozen. In July 2024, Lukashenko described Ukraine as an enemy.

== Historical relations ==
=== Pre-1991 background ===
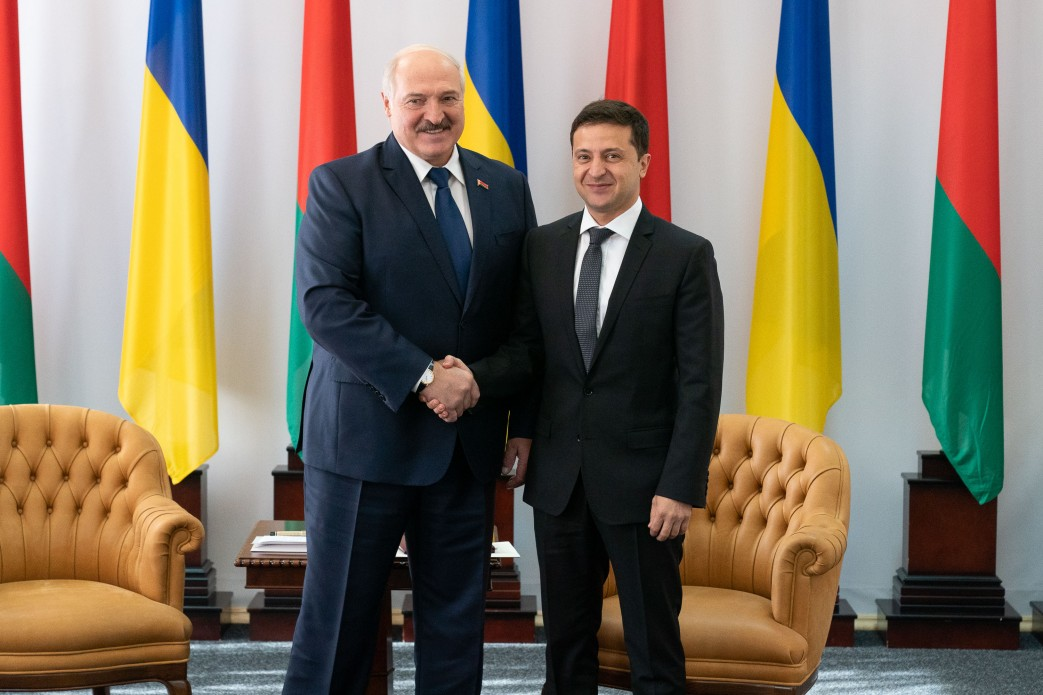
Alexander Lukashenko and Volodymyr Zelenskyy in Zhytomyr on October 4, 2019

Both countries, each historically part of Kievan Rus' (9th to 13th centuries CE), came gradually under the control of the Polish–Lithuanian Commonwealth (1569-1795), and ultimately, of the Russian Empire (1721-1917). The Second Polish Republic ruled parts of each in the period from 1918 to 1939. Prior to the 1991 breakup, both countries formed part of the Soviet Union (founded in 1922) as the Byelorussian SSR (founded in 1920) and Ukrainian SSR (founded in 1919); they both became founding members of the United Nations in their own right in 1945. As Slavic nations, both Belarus and Ukraine share closely related cultures and are predominantly inhabited by the East Slavic ethnic groups of Belarusians and Ukrainians respectively.

There was an extensive period of diplomatic cooperation from 1918 to 1921 when the Belarusian Democratic Republic made contacts with the Ukrainian People's Republic (UNR) and the Ukrainian State of Pavlo Skoropadsky. Skoropadsky's government made the largest overtures to the Belarusians, with him himself informally recognizing the Belarusian DR as de facto independent in October–November 1918, although de jure recognition did not materialize. The UNR, although hesitant in the beginning, ultimately attempted to follow this route in international relations after Skoropadsky's fall. During this period, although without formal recognition, both countries established diplomatic ties in May 1918, exchanged diplomatic missions, the Ukrainians provided financial assistance to the Belarusian government and there were ideas of a federated defensive alliance between Ukraine and Belarus.

== Modern era ==
Today, the two countries share an 891–km border. An agreement on the state border between Belarus and Ukraine signed in 1997 was to be submitted to the Belarusian parliament for ratification after Belarusian President Alexander Lukashenko and former Ukrainian President Viktor Yushchenko finished the process of the formalization of the border issues between the two states in early November 2009.

Belarusian businessman Valentin Baiko is the Honorary Consul of Ukraine in Belarus.

=== Breakdowns in relations ===
In August 2020, during the Belarusian protests against Lukashenko, Ukraine recalled its ambassador to Belarus for the first time to assess "the new reality" and prospects of further bilateral relations between the two neighboring countries. Belarus returned detained contractors (whom Lukashenko said were part of the Wagner Group) to Russia, coming in defiance of Ukrainian calls to send those who were detained to Ukraine to be prosecuted for their role in the War in Donbas. In a meeting with member of Ukraine's Verkhovna Rada Yevgeniy Shevchenko in April 2021, Lukashenko criticized former Ukrainian president Leonid Kravchuk for suggesting that Minsk be removed as a host in the Normandy Format as a result of the protests.

In response to the forced diversion of Ryanair Flight 4978 by the Belarusian government in May 2021, Ukraine banned Belarusian airlines from operating in Ukrainian airspace. In addition, Ukraine joined the European Union in imposing sanctions on Belarusian officials. In response to Ukraine, Belarus imposed new trade barriers on a variety of Ukrainian goods entering Belarus.

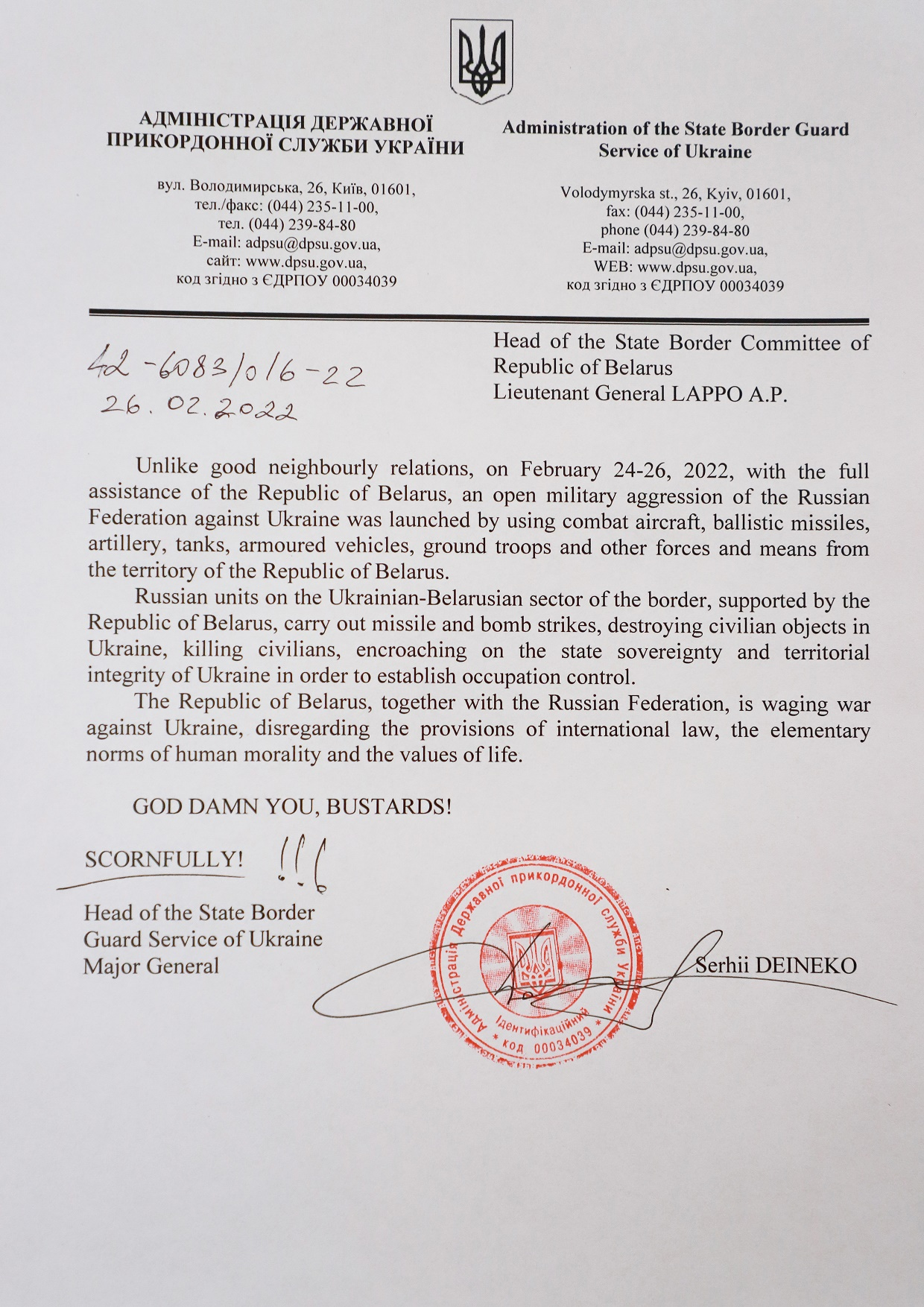
Letter from Head of State Border Guard Service of Ukraine S. V. Deyneko to State Border Committee of Belarus A. P. Lappo, 26.02.2022

In February 2022, Russian troops invaded Ukraine from Belarus. Belarus has also stated that Russian nuclear weapons will be on Belarusian soil. In June 2023, Lukashenko claimed that “the only mistake we made was not finishing off Ukraine with Russia in 2014”. In July 2024, Lukashenko called Ukraine an "enemy" and narrated that the Belarusian troops have a "high combat readiness" near Belarus–Ukraine border. On 10 August 2024, Belarus' Foreign Ministry called upon Ukraine's charge d'affaires, urging Kyiv to address airspace violations following President Alexander Lukashenko's claim that Belarus had destroyed a dozen Ukrainian drones in its airspace. The ministry warned that if Ukraine failed to prevent such incidents, it would question the "appropriateness" of maintaining Ukraine's diplomatic representation in Minsk.

=== Potential rapprochement ===
On 19 October 2025, Ivan Tertel, the head of the Belarusian State Security Committee, claimed that the country was ready to "find a consensus" with Ukraine regarding an end to the Russo-Ukrainian war. This represented a shift as Belarus is attempting to break its diplomatic and economic isolation by playing a mediating role in return for an ease in Western sanctions.

== Diplomatic visits ==
- From Ukraine to Belarus
  - Petro Poroshenko (Minsk, 2014)
  - Petro Poroshenko (Minsk, 2015)
  - Petro Poroshenko (Gomel, 2018)
- From Belarus to Ukraine
  - Alexander Lukashenko (Kyiv, 2004)
  - Alexander Lukashenko (Kyiv, 2009)
  - Alexander Lukashenko (Kyiv, 2017)
  - Alexander Lukashenko (Zhytomyr, 2019)

== Resident diplomatic missions ==
- Belarus has an embassy in Kyiv.
- Ukraine has an embassy in Minsk and a consulate-general in Brest.
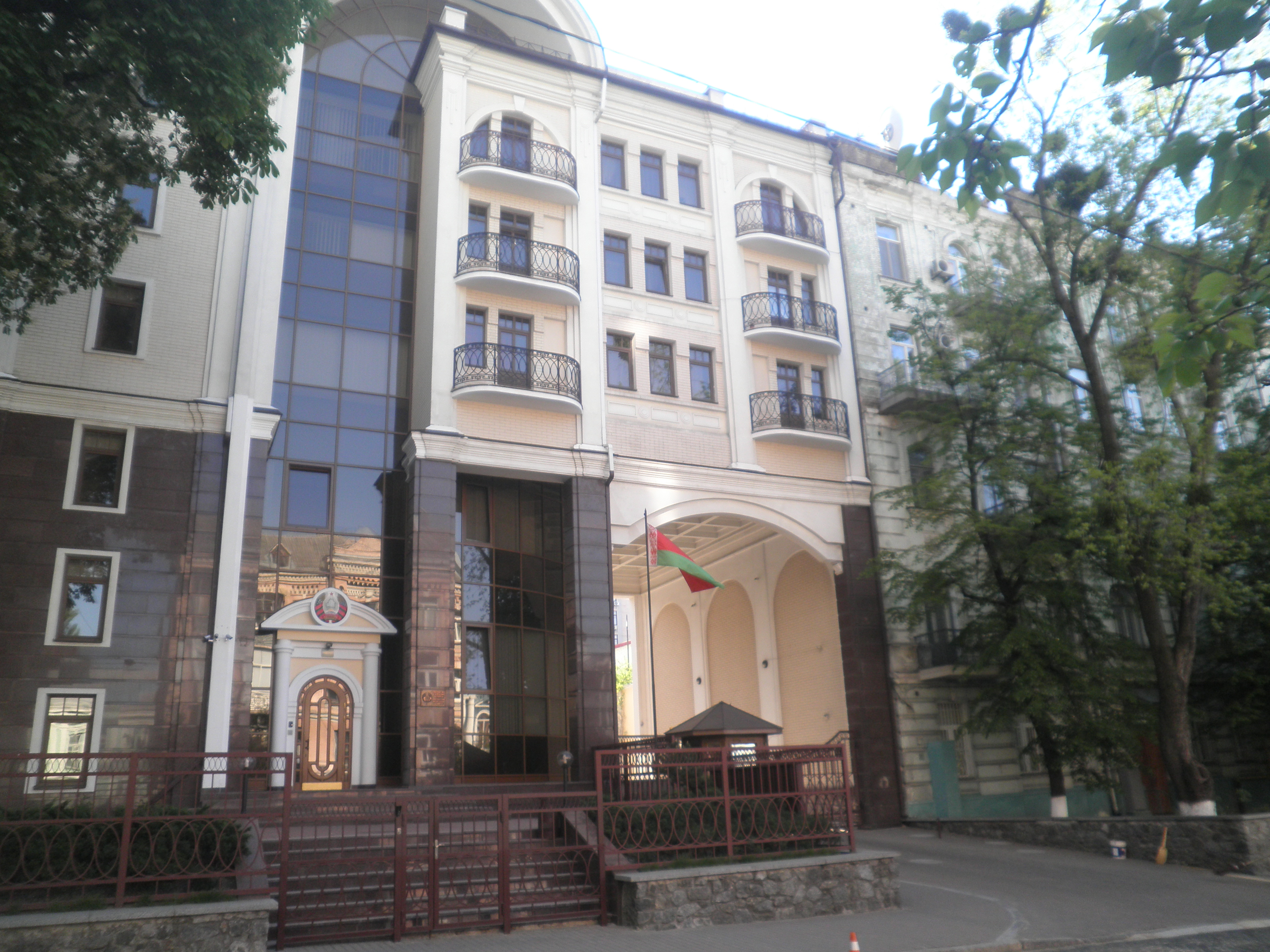
Embassy of Belarus in Kyiv

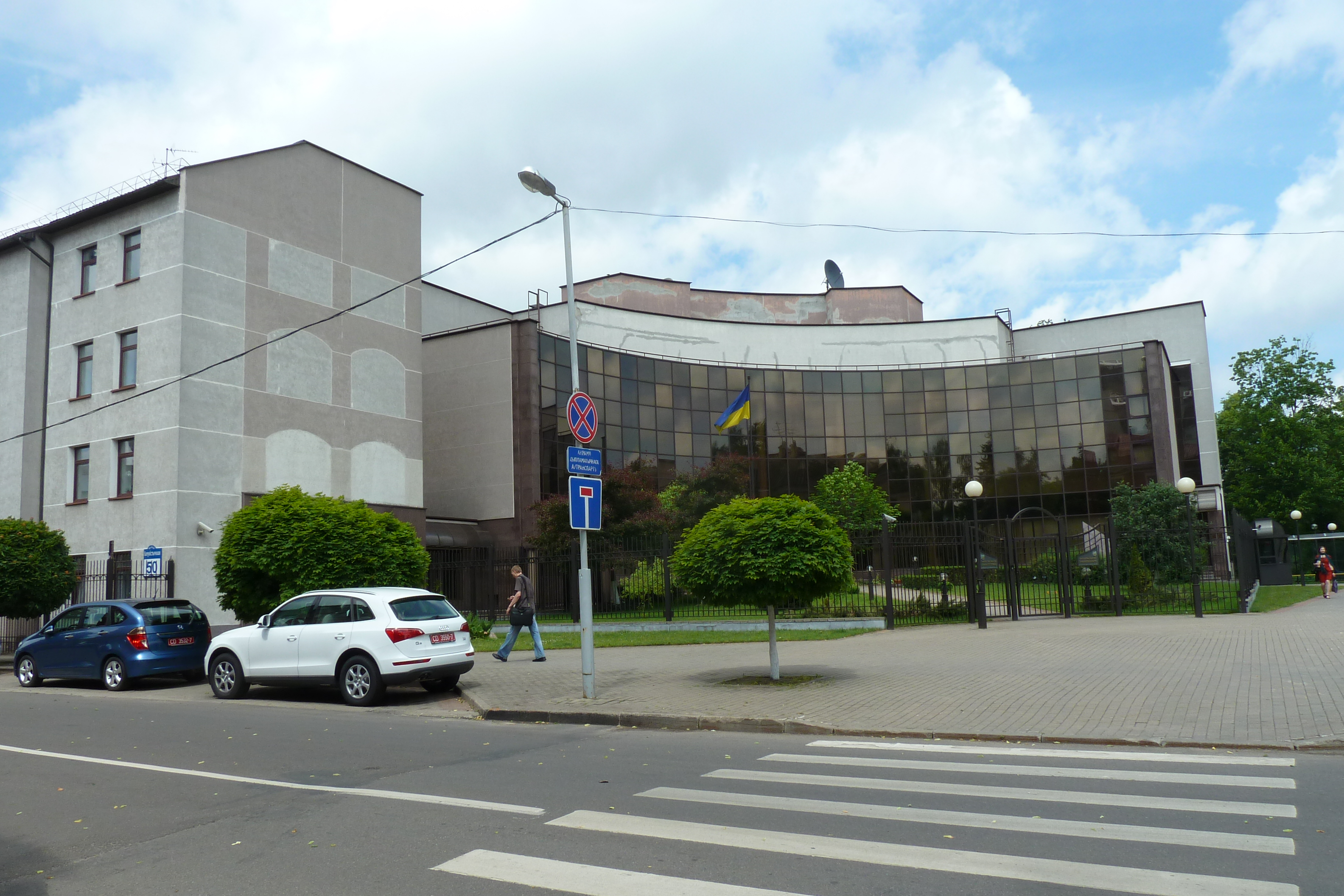
Embassy of Ukraine in Minsk

== See also ==
- Foreign relations of Belarus
- Foreign relations of Ukraine
- Belarus–Ukraine border
- Belarusians in Ukraine
- Belarusian involvement in the 2022 Russian invasion of Ukraine
- Monument to the Belarusians who died for Ukraine
- Ukrainians in Belarus
