= -nik =

English suffix from Slavic languages

The English suffix -nik is of Slavic origin. It approximately corresponds to the suffix "-er" and nearly always denotes an agent noun (that is, it describes a person related to the thing, state, habit, or action described by the word to which the suffix is attached). In the cases where a native English language coinage may occur, the "-nik"-word often bears an ironic connotation, as in the case of the terms coined for the failed rocket launch of the U.S. satellite rival to Sputnik, such as kaputnik, dudnik and flopnik among others.

== History ==
The suffix existed in English for a long time. An example is raskolnik, recorded by the Oxford English Dictionary as known since 1723. There have been two main waves of the introduction of this suffix into English language. The first was driven by Yinglish words contributed by Yiddish speakers from Eastern Europe. The second surge was observed after the launch of the first Sputnik satellite by the Soviet Union on October 4, 1957.

In the fourth edition of his book The American Language, H. L. Mencken (1880–1956) credited the mania for adding "-nik" to the ends of adjectives to create nouns to Al Capp's American comic strip Li'l Abner (1934–1977) rather than to the influence of "Sputnik", first recorded in 1957, or "beatnik", first recorded in 1958.

== Vocabulary ==
=== Mainstream ===
Words of significant context or usage:

- Beatnik
- Chainik
- Potatonik, Jewish potato dish
- Refusenik
- Sputnik

=== Casual ===
Casual neologisms:

- Alrightnik: one who has been successful; nouveau riche, especially one who forgot his friends and origins; used as an insult
- Artnik, a UK publisher (defunct); the word predates its establishment
- Muttnik, the first dog in space
- Neatnik: a neat-freak
- Nogoodnik: a lazy, incompetent or malicious person
- Peacenik: a pacifist; a hippie
- Wordnik

=== Jewish adaptation ===
Words originally used by Jews of Europe, America, and Israel, often referring to concepts related to their experiences or things happening in Israel or among the Jewish people:

- Chabadnik or Habadnik: follower of Chabad
- Kadimanik: member of United Synagogue Youth's Kadima program
- Ka-tzetnik: a Nazi concentration camp prisoner or survivor, derived from abbreviation KZ, pronounced "Ka-tzet"
- Kibbutznik: member of a Kibbutz
- Lamedvavnik
- Likudnik: supporter of Israeli political party Likud
- Limmudnik: participant or attendee of Limmud events
- Mapainik: supporter of the historical Israeli labor party Mapai
- Moshavnik: member of a Moshav
- Mossadnik: Mossad agent
- Netzernik: Member of the Netzer Olami youth movement
- Nudnik: a nagging, boring or awkward person
- Shinuinik: supporter of Israeli political party Shinui
- Hamasnik: A member or supporter of Hamas

=== Slavic languages ===
Native or constructed Slavic words originating in Slavic-speaking environments:

- Čelnik
- Chetnik
- Druzhinnik
- Gopnik
- Kolkhoznik
- Kukuruznik
- Narodnik
- Namestnik
- Oprichnik
- Patatnik
- Peredvizhnik
- Podkulachnik
- Podruchnik
- Poglavnik
- Polkovnik
- Raskolnik
- Sotnik
- Sovkhoznik
- Subbotnik
- Syrnik
- Udarnik
- Varenik
- Vatnik
- Voskresnik
- Zapadnik
- Zolotnik

There are quite a few proper nouns (surnames and place names) with this suffix.

== See also ==
- English terms suffixed with -nik
- Wiktionary: -ник
