= Boycott Russian Films =

Ukrainian civic campaign

- Бойкот російського кіно
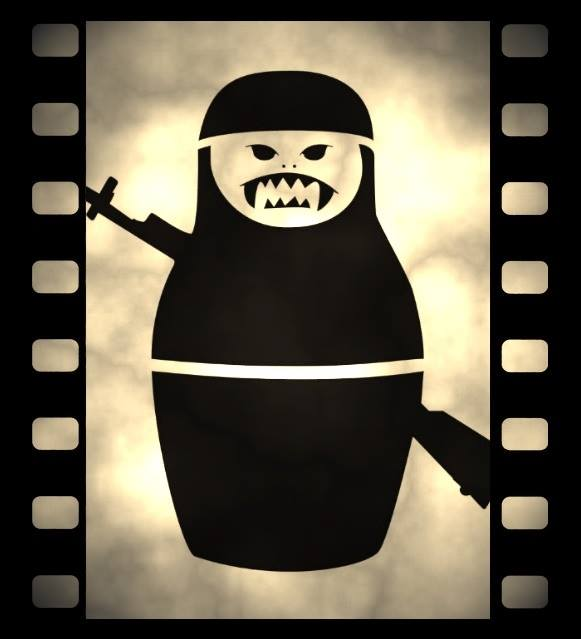
- Logo of campaign
- Formation: August 2014
- Founder: Vidsich
- Type: Civic campaign
- Location: Ukraine
- Members: Do not buy Russian goods!
- Website: vidsich.info

Boycott Russian Films (Ukrainian: Бойкот російського кіно, romanized: Boikot rosiiskoho kino) is a Ukrainian civic campaign that supports a boycott of Russian films and television series. It is a part of a broader boycott campaign called "Do not buy Russian goods!" started by the Ukrainian social movement Vidsich.

== Causes ==
The campaign arose as a reaction to the occupation, military actions and mercenaries by the Russian Federation against Ukraine in 2014. The dominance of Russian TV on the Ukrainian television, as well as the anti-Ukrainian sentiment and anti-Ukrainian propaganda, the praising of Russian security forces and secret police, all led to the boycott of the Russian TV and films movement.

== Goal ==
The goal of the activists is to significantly limit Russian content shown on Ukrainian television and in movie theaters of Ukraine.

== Prerequisites ==
In March 2014, the statement was publicized, in which many Russian artists, including those associated with the film industry, with their signatures, expressed support for the Russian president Vladimir Putin, in particular for the annexation of the Crimea and military actions in eastern Ukraine.

In March 2014, with the restoration of the campaign "Do not buy Russian goods!", civic activists together with some politicians reached out to the public for a boycott of Russian TV series and overall television.

The first notable case of the boycott of the Russian cinema was announced on 11 April 2014 when some movie theaters in Kyiv, Lviv and Odesa announced that they will no longer show Russian films.

== Course of events ==
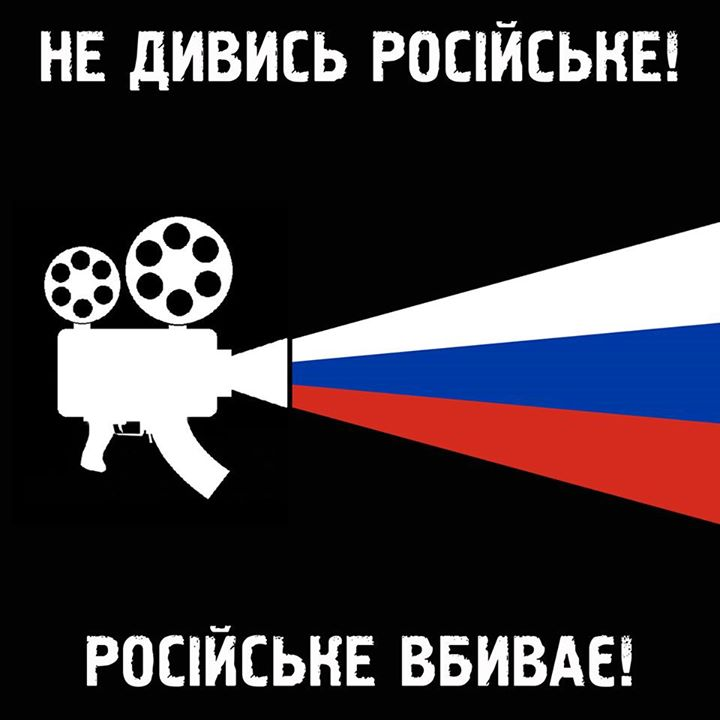
Campaign poster

In late August, 2014, activists of the Civil Movement "Vidsich" as a part of the campaign "Do not buy Russian goods!" launch a campaign to boycott Russian films and TV series. The Internet exploded with official pages and people massively started distributing messages, pictures, etc. urging not to watch Russian films.

On 27 August 2014, activists struck Ukrainian TV channel ICTV. The demand of the protesters was to remove Russian TV series off the air.

On 4 September 2014 at the State Agency of Ukraine for Cinema in Kyiv, activists held a theatrical protest "Will not let vata in our homes" ("vata" (English: wadding, Ukrainian: вата, Russian: вата) originated from the word "vatnik," a term coined in 2011 to describe jingoistic supporters of the Russian government), during which they showed a disapproval of the dominance of Russian TV products on Ukrainian television. Young protesters demanded to establish a strict control over the content of Russian films and clean Ukrainian media space of the films that harm the national interests of Ukraine. According to the activists, Russian movies and series carry hidden anti-Ukrainian propaganda, in particular humiliating Ukrainians and exalt the idea of the "Russian World" (Ukrainian: "Російський світ", Russian: "Русский мир"), Russian armed forces and such. In addition, activists point out that the majority of the profits from the selling the rights to show movies goes to Russia.

Starting from September 2014, mainly in Kyiv, activists organize actions against the presence of Russian films and serials on Ukrainian television at the National Council for Television and Radio Broadcasting and the central offices of Ukrainian TV channels. The protests also address the shooting of the Russian serials in Ukraine and so on.

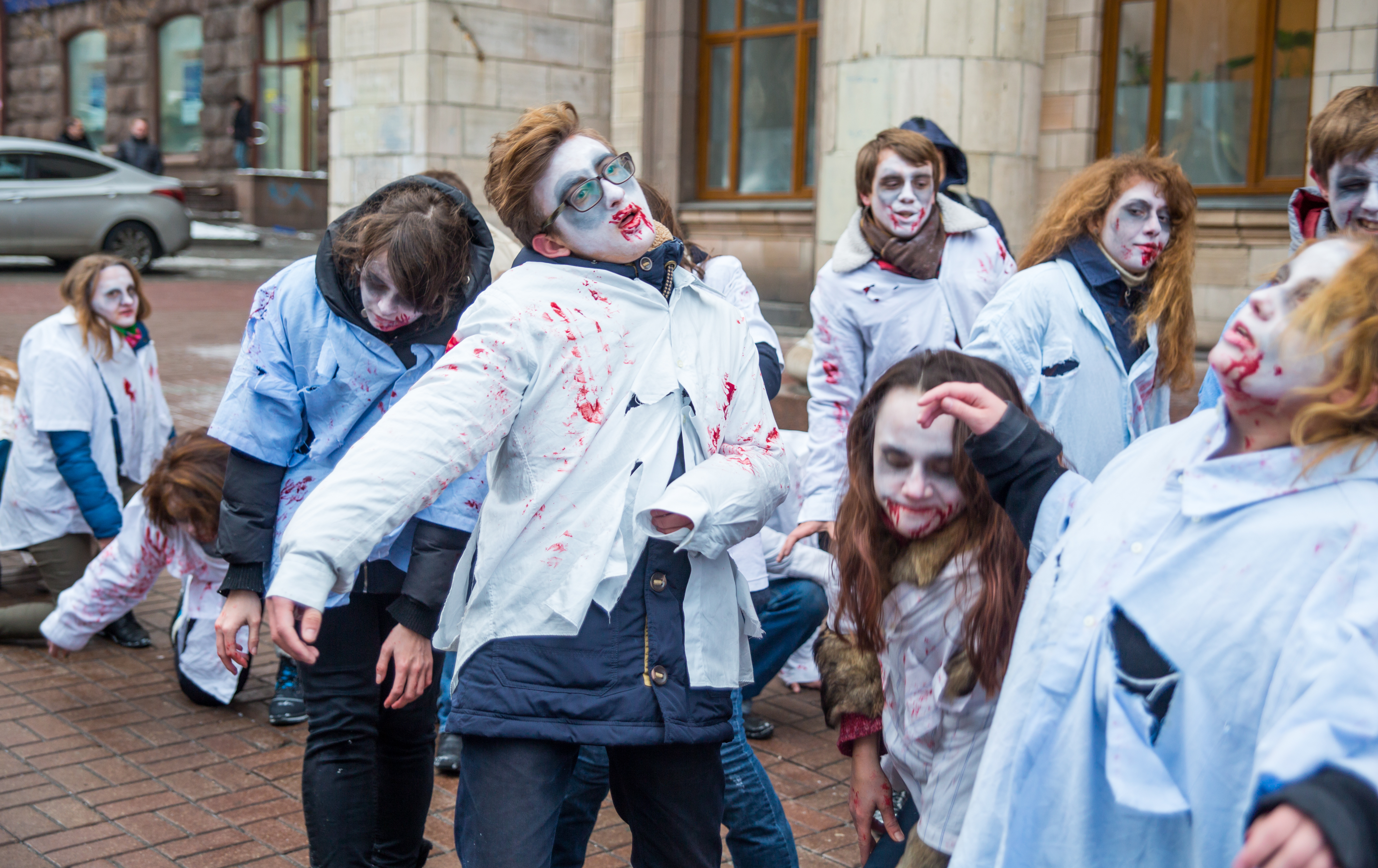
Performance at the National Council for TV and Radio

On 3 December 2014 in Kyiv at the National Council for Radio and Television, "Vidsich" activists held a theatrical protest whose purpose was to express the necessity to prohibit Russian movies, series, shows and other content on Ukrainian television. According to activists, the zombies at the protest portrayed ordinary viewers who have become "victims" of Russian propaganda and followers of the "Russian world". The representative of the National Council, Vladislav Sevryukov, during the campaign said that the procedure of a license broadcaster is rather complicated and the process of replacing Russian TV production is long. The National Council pledged to work on new legislation to combat Russian propaganda.

On 11 December 2014 activists picketed the head office of TV channel "Inter" in Kyiv. During the action "Do not kill our defenders with Russian propaganda!" Young people glued the main entrance with photographs of Ukrainian dead soldiers in the 2014 Russian military intervention in Ukraine. According to activists, "Inter" ranked 2nd among channels showing content of Russian origin. Protesters emphasised that Russian films and serials glorifying Russian security forces at the time of war is unacceptable.

On 22 December 2014 "Vidsich" movement activists near the Presidential Administration of Ukraine demanded the complete banning of Russian films for the duration of the war, except those, which have "The Oscars" or "Palme d'Or" awards and have not any propaganda. Young people announced that an amount of Russian content on Ukrainian TV is increasing. Activists gave petitions and propositions to administration representatives, addressed to the president of Ukraine Petro Poroshenko, and made a performance near the building. During it bloody zombies with sham machine guns and ribbons of Saint George demanded retrieval of Russian films in which Mikhail Porechenkov and Ivan Okhlobystin acted.

From 29 December 2014 activists picketed a screening of the Russian films in Kyiv's movie theaters. Activists combined the pickets with another performance of "Russian goods kills!" flash mobs, which they made for "Do not buy Russian goods!" campaign. Pickets were to shows the film "Fir-trees 1914" (Russian: "Ёлки 1914") on 29 December and 4 January 2015.

From 31 December 2014 to 1 January 2015 during celebration of New Year the "Inter" TV channel broadcast a New Year show "Wait for me in the New Year" (Russian: «Жди меня в Новый год») with Russian stars who have supported occupation of Crimea by Russia (Joseph Kobzon, Oleg Gazmanov, Valeriya, etc.). This event immediately caused a burst of resentment in Ukrainian blogosphere and social network. On 1 January a number of Ukrainian high-ranked officials, politicians and cultural workers have reacted. "1+1" TV channel was also criticised for the New Year's Eve content as the channel televised the "80th Disco" programme with Oleg Gazmanov participating.

On 27 January 2015 "Vidsich" activists near the National Council for Television and Radio Broadcasting of Ukraine held an action "TV screen are full of wadding - National Council does not care!" Young people wrapped the building facade in wadding (construction wool) and wrote pretensions to the council. Activists claimed they are not satisfied with the head of institution Yuriy Artemenko, his deputy Olga Gerasimyuk and the activity of National Council in general. This was substantiated by absence of any actions against "Inter" and other TV channels for their violations, particularly violation of regulation about compulsory 50% of Ukrainian content in broadcasting. After this National Council have appointed consideration of compliance with quotas by TV and radio channels of Ukraine on its conference on 12 February.

On 2 March 2015 activists of "Vidsich" and other activists held an action "While government protracts, Ukrainian blood effuses" near Verkhovna Rada. They demanded that parliament chairman Volodymyr Groysman signed the law #1317 "About changes to several laws of Ukraine for the protection of informational TV-Radio space of Ukraine" which have to considerably limit amounts of Russian TV-product in Ukrainian television. The law was adopted in the first reading on 5 February, but it was still not signed on the day the action happened. Earlier activists published petition to the chairman of Verkhovna Rada which was signed by many public organizations of Ukraine.

In March 2015 Ukrainian rock-group "Kozak System" released a music video named "Нахуй маніфест" (English: Fuck off manifest) in which musicians expressed their attitude to Russian invaders and called for boycott of Russian goods in unusual way. In song lyrics there are negative statements particularly against common TV audience of Ukraine and Russia; against certain Russian art workers known for their antiukrainian statements; against some Russian and Soviet films and serials, etc. In clip used simbol of "Do not buy Russian goods!" campaign.

On 17 March 2015 in Kyiv activists held a theatrical action near Verkhovna Rada demanding that Volodymyr Groysman, the head of it signed law-project #1317. Young people claimed that the speaker of parliament violated terms of signing described in regulations. During the action activists dressed and acting like zombied demanded that Groysman don't sign the document. The next day members of parliament did not support the resolution of rejecting this law. After this Groysman sign law-project #1317.

== Investigation ==
=== Origin content ===
The first week in September 2014, activists monitored Ukrainian television. According to them, the 10 leading Ukrainian TV channels ("Ukraine", "ICTV", "NTN", "Novyi Kanal", "Inter", "STB", "2+2", "TET", "K1", "1+1") for these days 71 Russian film or TV series were shown. The activists concluded that Russian "cinema" dominates in the Ukrainian television. According to the participants in the initiative, the content was mostly of a very poor quality and often contained hostile Russian propaganda.

The second week in September 2014, activists held another monitor of the 10 leading Ukrainian TV channels. According to the participants of the campaign, some Russian television has more than a half of the air speaking time. TV shows Russian at least 1/6 of the day. On average, one channel demonstrates more than 7.5 hours of TV-Russian.

On 27 September 2014, activists monitored Ukrainian TV channels. According to them, the Russian content on the TV holds 40%. Activists noted that over the previous monitoring volumes of Russian air content increased. The largest Russian content broadcasting channel "Ukraine" — contains 87% of the total broadcasting time. Next in the ranking — the TV channel "NTN" (71%), "Inter" (67%), "ICTV" (43%), "2+2" (42%). Separately, activists have noted the Russian contents. A significant part of the series consists of "heroic" employees of Russian and Soviet military and secret police.

From 27 October – 2 November 2014 activists counted in the program of the top-ten Ukrainian TV channels 68 Russian films and serials (excluding the Soviet cinema, Russian shows and cartoons).

On 1–7 December 2014 activists of the campaign monitored 10 Ukrainian TV channels for the amount of Russian content. According to their results, the volume of Russian TV comparing to the monitoring conducted on 8–14 September only increased. Activists, particularly distinguished those channels which already showed most Russian content — channel "Ukraine" (now replaced by My-Ukraine) has increased volumes of Russian content from 12:45 to 15:15 daily (some days — to more than 20 hours a day), the channel "Inter" — from 11:15 to 13:15. The third place took channel "NTN" that showed Russian content more than the 12 hours a daily.

On 5–11 December 2015 activists of "Boycott Russian Films" campaign have conducted a monitoring. Its results show that "Ukraine" and "Inter" TV channels violates legal requirement of 50% of national content in broadcasting (article 9 of Law Of Ukraine "About television and radiobroadcasting"). Activists found out there is 16% of Ukrainian content on "Ukraine" and 17% on "Inter" channels.

=== Languages of content ===
On 1 October 2014, activists, based on the data collected on 27 September, released the monitoring statistics on the language of the content of Ukrainian TV channels. According to them, Ukrainian language content hold only 29%, exclusively Russian-speaking — 39.3%, Russian-Ukrainian with subtitles — 23.5%, bilingual (Ukrainian and Russian) — 8.2%.

=== Televiewers and ordinary people ===
In December 2014 "Telekrytyka" published sociological research, made with assistance of "Kyiv International Institute of Sociology". According to it 60.9% residents of Ukraine did not watch Russian serials recently. Researchers remark that Ukrainians feel necessity of strengthening of informational policy. They are ready to support different steps, which could strengthen informational safety of Ukraine, mainly through the limiting of broadcasting of Russian TV Channels. But there are supporters of Russian serials in all regions, as among men, as among women, among people of different age and level of education.

== Reactions ==
=== Artists, experts and the public ===
- In mid-September 2014, Ukrainian writer Oksana Zabuzhko spoke out about enormous amount of Russian TV on Ukrainian television: "...the situation is schizophrenic: on the one hand there is bloodshed, people die, whether they are Russian or Ukrainian speaking or a mix of both, no difference, those who identify themselves as Ukrainians are dying. And at the same time, only in the first week of September, 10 Ukrainian channels showed 71 Russian TV series, including "Liquidation", where security officers kill Banderites."
- On 3 October 2014, Ukrainian writer Andriy Kokotyukha stated that he believes that Russia's series of "cops", "NKVD" and "special forces" continue to be on Ukrainian television because "they have nothing to replace it with."
- In October 2014, volunteer battalion commander Yuriy Bereza ("Dnipro-1"), Semen Semenchenko ("Donbass") and Andriy Teteruk ("Myrotvorets") addressed an open letter to the president of Ukraine Petro Poroshenko to stop the "broadcast of Russian propaganda in the form of media product, including series, movies, entertainment, where the enemy is being idealized and depicted."
- In October 2014, Ukrainian political analyst Volodymyr Fesenko said that the ban on Russian TV series is a very dangerous step. The expert considers it as inappropriate and untimely to be showing series of Russian paratroopers, but notes that we cannot "rush to extremes": "I do not support the ban. It's one thing when there is a direct manifestation of the information warfare being waged through news blocks. They are leading an aggressive propaganda, and I understand, as a temporary measure, to ban those channels that lead this informational war. As for the series, we can get too far. The next stage may be — to ban all Russian goods. And weather we like it or not, half of the population are either ethnic Russians, or people who have family ties, ethnically, culturally related to the Russian tradition. So we should trim it? It would not be quite right."
- Film director, Ihor Savychenko, founder of "Cinema Directory" (Ukrainian: "Директорія кіно"), in December 2014 stated that the government prohibiting Russian products should substitute it with an alternative. Instead, he said, the state's funding for film production only decreases. "If the state prohibits something, it should know that what's destroys a large part of the market, destroys the whole industry. You must give something back. Give money to the film industry, so we don't have to leave the country and could carry on with our work. Until 2012, we lived of Russian serials and movies being shot in Ukraine. Since 2013, when the fund "Derzhkino" [Ukrainian State Film Agency] was founded, we began shooting our own films and series. Now this balance is disturbed."

=== Political authority in Ukraine ===
==== Parliament ====
On 20 October 2014, to the Verkhovna Rada of Ukraine was proposed a bill #5036 on Amendments to the Law "On Television and Radio" to protect the interests of the state on the proposal of deputy Mykola Tomenko. The document called for ban on TV broadcasting of audiovisual works, among which the main characters are law enforcement officers, armed forces, special services of the Russian Federation and/or the USSR, and/or Russian Empire (other than audiovisual works of Soviet production, which were developed to August 1991) and those "who glorified the invaders of Ukraine." However, the bill did not receive the required number of votes.

On 9 December 2014, in the Parliament of Ukraine, MP's Mykola Knyazhytsky and Vadym Denisenko, registered a draft law amending some laws of Ukraine in regards to television and radio space information protection of Ukraine #1317. The document proposed to amend the Law of Ukraine "On Cinematography", mainly—add Article 15-1 "Distribution and demonstration of films, which contains some of the popularization of occupier's authorities and values of criminal subculture" and "On Television and Radio". According to the article, any distribution (showing on air) in Ukraine of any films (audiovisual works), which contains popularization, agitation, propaganda, and any action of law enforcement agencies, armed forces and other armed, military or security forces of an occupier is strictly prohibited.

On 13 January 2015, Parliament of Ukraine accepted the law by 240 votes adopted on first reading.

After adopting a law-project in the first reading in Verkhovna Rada, law-projects of Andriy Levus and Viktoria Siumar were introduced.

Several alternative or related bills were appeared after adopting the bill #1317 in the first reading by Verkhovna Rada of Ukraine. There were: the bill #1768 (on the proposal of Andriy Levus, Serhiy Vysotskyi ta Mykola Velychkovych), #1824 and #1889 (on the proposal of Viktoria Siumar in particular).

On 5 February, parliament adopted law-project #1317 on the second reading by 259 votes. The amendment by Radical Party was adopted, according to which all films and serials made in Russian Federation after 1 August 1991 must be banned. However, after the vote different interpretations were appeared of what amendment had been included.

On 6 February 2015, MP's from the "Opposition Bloc" Yuriy Boyko and Mykhaylo Papiyev submitted a draft resolution #1317-P. This resolution was to cancel Law #1317. Members of the coalition claimed that in this way opposition delayed final approval of the bill #1317, because they did not appear to the committee, where their bill #1317-P should be considered.

On 18 March 2015, draft resolution #1317-P was rejected, then and after actions of activists, Volodymyr Groysman signed the bill.

On 19 March 2015, "Telekrytyka" published the text of the bill #1317, which supposedly was signed by Volodymyr Groysman. Text was provided to journalists by the head of the Parliamentary Committee for Culture and Spirituality, co-author of the document Mykola Knyazhytsky. In the bill an amendment to ban all films made in Russia after 1 August 1991 was not included.

On 2 April 2015, President of Ukraine Petro Poroshenko signed a bill #1317. On 6 April, it was posted on the website of Verkhovna Rada of Ukraine as the Law #159-VIII of 5 April 2015. The document has come into force on 4 June 2015.

==== State Agency of Ukraine for Cinema ====
In October 2014, the State Agency of Ukraine for Cinema ("Derzhkino") forbidden to display Russian series dedicated to Russia's security services. According to the president of the agency, Pylyp Illyenko, the decision was made due to the recent events in Ukraine and "it would be inhuman to show Russian films, which is outright propaganda, like the glorification of power structures in and of itself on Ukrainian TV." Later, after the scandal and public protests, the department also prohibits movies with Mikhail Porechenkov, and calls on leaders of television and the media to censor his appearance on the air as well as Joseph Kobzon, Ivan Okhlobystin, Mikhail Zadornov and other Russian artists for their anti-Ukrainian statements and actions. On 9 December, "Derzhkino" banned 71st film and series featuring Russian actor and screenwriter, Ivan Okhlobystin. In December, "Derzhkino" also promised support for those channels boycotting Russian content and prohibited to show 4 more Russian films. On 5 February 2015, "Derzhkino" have banned another 20 Russian films and serials.

==== National Council of Radio and Television ====
The head of the National Council of Radio and Television, Yuriy Artemenko, after public protests, said that it would be more suitable for the channels themselves to ban movies and series with Porechenkov and Okhlobystin in them. "Perhaps the situation with the prohibition of movies with Okhlobystin and Porechenkov will make the channels to come out with some kind of initiative proposal, with some policies regarding not all Russian TV series, but only those that cause the least surprise" — the official said. In December 2014 first deputy head of the Council Olha Herasymyuk said that certain Russian films are used as a mean of propaganda that is why they have to be banned. Also, according to her words, Ukrainian TV-channels plan to buy less Russian serials than previous year, but anyway the purchase will remain massive.

== Name ==
Activists secured the campaign's name "Boycott Russian Films" (Ukrainian: "Бойкот російського кіно") as from the beginning, it was the name of the official campaign page on Facebook. Later the name spread particularly through the mass media. The name slightly loses the sense when translated into English as in Ukrainian a word "кіно" can mean all cinema, films, and even television when in English the definition is more narrowed.

== See also ==
- Remember about the Gas — Do not buy Russian goods!
- International sanctions during the 2014 pro-Russian unrest in Ukraine
- Russian financial crisis (2014–2016)
- Magnitsky Act
- Boycott Chinese products
- Chinese boycotts of Japanese products
- Great American Boycott
- Nonviolent resistance
- Russofobia
- Derussification in Ukraine
- Russification of Ukraine

== Sources ==
- Russian TV series: the economic weapon working in slow motion (in Ukrainian). Forbes. 13 May 2014
- Teledecolonisation is needed! (in Ukrainian). Serhiy Hrabovskyi Den. 24 October 2014
- The defeated Russian "Spetsnaz" (in Ukrainian). Valentyna Samchenko. Ukrayina Moloda. # 162, 31 October 2014
- Patriots announced a boycott of Russian-language TV content (in Ukrainian). Artem Kurikhin. Porohy. 25 November 2014
