= Remember about the Gas – Do not buy Russian goods! =

Ukrainian civic campaign

- Пам'ятай про газ – не купуй російських товарів!
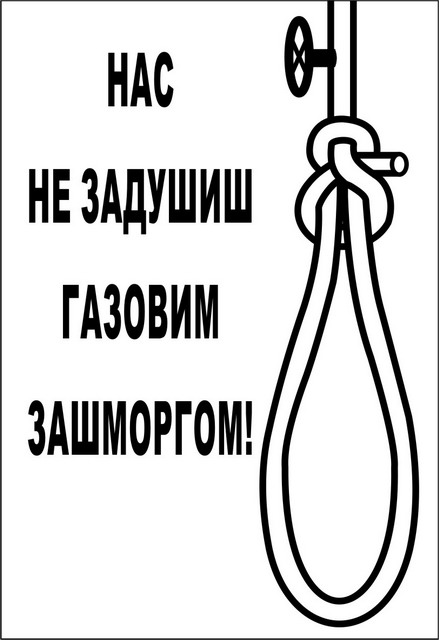
- One of the images used in the leaflets, stickers, and posters calling for a boycott of Russian goods: нас не задушиш газовим зашморгом! ("You won't suffocate us with gas!")
- Successor: Do not buy Russian goods!
- Formation: December 2005
- Type: Civic campaign
- Location: Ukraine

"Remember about the Gas – Do not buy Russian goods!" (Ukrainian: Пам'ятай про газ – не купуй російських товарів!) was a nonviolent resistance social boycott of Russian goods in Ukraine that arose as a reaction to political pressure of the Russian Federation on Ukraine in the gas conflict of 2005–2006. The campaign started in December 2005, most likely with flyers posted by unknown activists in Kropyvnytskyi (Kirovohrad in 2005). After gaining publicity, this idea was adopted by other social and political organizations. The campaign remained active during the gas conflict of 2005–2006 and 2008–2009 between Ukraine and the Russian Federation.

== Course of events ==
=== 2005 ===
In December 2005, unknown activists in Kropyvnytskyi handed out leaflets with the words "Remember about the gas", "Do not buy Russian goods" and the image of a gas pipe at the height of the gas conflict between Russia and Ukraine. News about the leaflets was published by the online newspaper "Ves' Kirovohrad". On December 22, and the next few days the news item was repeated by several publications. On December 22 the leaflet campaign appeared on the website "Maidan" by activists of Alliance "Maidan". On December 23 the news item called for a boycott of Russian goods. It also called for printing and distributing leaflets and stickers. And to send messages and emails of the appeals that were on the website "Maidan". According to activists, on December 24, Ukrainian news sites and later Russian ones reported on it, after which the campaign gained publicity.

=== 2006 ===
On 4 January 2006, in Rivne social movement "Pure Ukraine" and the party People's Union "Our Ukraine" presented a nationwide campaign "Blackmail – no! Independence – yes!" Among other things, the launch of the first nationwide boycott of Russian goods was announced at a press conference.

On 4 January 2006, in Kyiv on Khreschatyk street activists held the first event calling not to buy Russian goods. These young people were supported by singer Maria Burmaka.

In early January 2006, "Ukrainian National Assembly" called for a boycott of Russian goods.

=== 2009 ===
On 1 January 2009, the Russian Federation stopped supplying natural gas to Ukraine during the new Ukrainian-Russian gas conflict. The gas transit pipeline was completely blocked. That same evening, activists of the Alliance "Maidan" spread through the Internet a call for a boycott of Russian goods, echoing the campaign in 2005–2006. The Russian authorities actions regarding the Ukraine gas was called racketeering: "Once more in the early days of the New Year Moscow and its "Gazprom" started gas racketeeting against Ukraine. But every Ukrainian has also leverage on an aggressive neighbor, DON'T CONSUME ITS OUTPUT!"

In January 2009, the idea was picked up by several social media outlets. In particular, it called for a boycott of Russian goods because of Russia's policy towards Ukraine in Kyiv and Lviv.

== Gallery ==
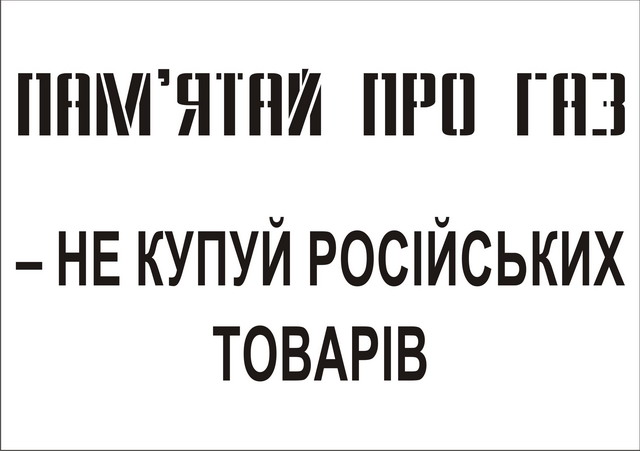
One of the images that were used during the campaign activists

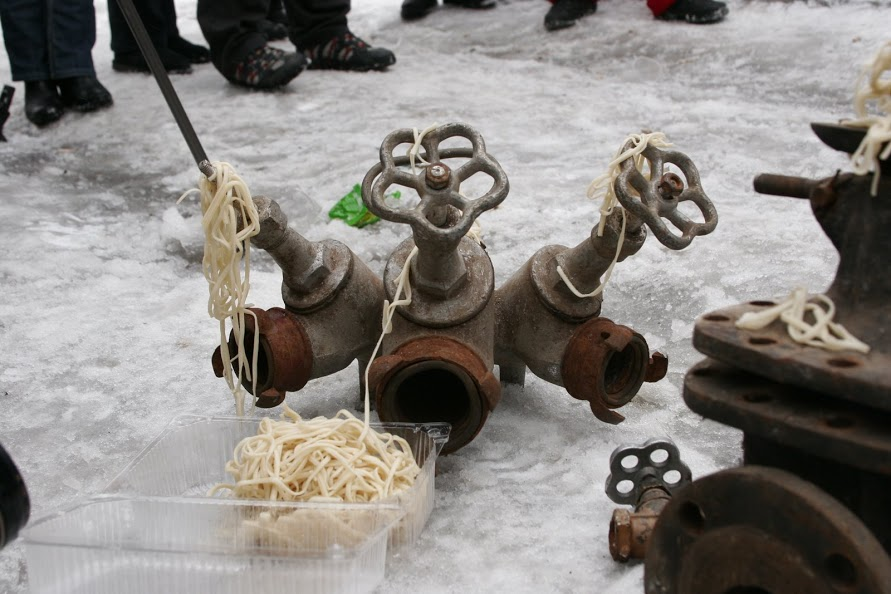
In action at the Russian embassy in Kyiv, 17 January 2009

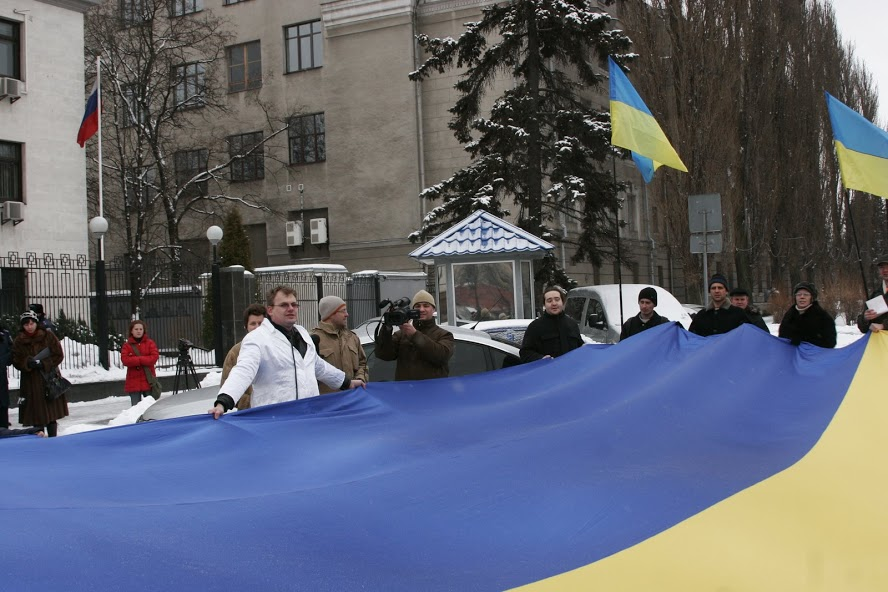
In action at the Russian embassy in Kyiv, 17 January 2009

== Reactions ==
In December 2005, former Rada Chairman Volodymyr Lytvyn said he would not send his friends any SMS with the text "Remember about the Gas – Do not buy Russian goods", because he believes that it will increase the ethnic strife.

In 2006, scientists from the Institute of State and Law of the National Academy of Sciences Ukraine argued that the campaign resulted in strengthening the agitation efforts of the Party of Regions and Viktor Yanukovych during the 2006 parliamentary elections. Particularly regarding the introduction of Russian as a second language in Ukraine, and for closer integration of Ukraine with Russia within the Common Economic Space.

After putting up flyers in Kropyvnytskyi by unknown activists, several grocery stores stopped ordering Russian chocolate and beer "Baltika".

According to activists in early 2006, the Spiritual Directorate of Buddhists Ukraine "Ninhma in Ukraine" supported its decision to boycott Russian goods. On their website they allegedly hung a banner "Do not buy Russian goods!"

In February 2006, historian Yaroslav Svatko said the Russian government was surprise by the campaign which led to unexpected consequences: the promotion of the idea of separating Ukrainian interests from Russia.

== Campaign Name ==
From the beginning the campaign's name came from the phrase "Remember about the gas" and "do not buy Russian goods" probably from leaflets that were handed out by unknown activists in Kropyvnytskyi. The activists of Alliance "Maidan" used the similar phrase: "Remember the gas – do not buy Russian goods!" That phrase was used by the media. Another widely used variation was "Remember the gas – do not buy Russian goods" (without the exclamation mark). In 2009, the variation "Remember the gas! Do not buy Russian goods!" was used as well as other variations.

== Successors ==
In August 2013, a public campaign with a similar name and concept emerged in response to the export blockade of Ukraine by Russia. It also got wide publicity and distribution in Ukraine. It was called "Do not buy Russian goods!" Later one more campaign appeared – "Boycott Russian Films".

== See also ==
- Black Pora!
- Russia–Ukraine relations

== Sources ==
- Акція «Не купуй російських товарів!» (in Ukrainian). List of news of Alliance "Maidan". Maidan Wiki. 9 January 2006.
