= Subotnick =

Subotnick and Subotnik is a surname. Notable people with the surname include:

- Daniel Subotnik (1942–2024), American law professor
- Morton Subotnick (born 1933), American composer of electronic music
- Rose Rosengard Subotnik (born 1942), American musicologist
- Steven Subotnick (fl. 1980s–2010s), animator and animation teacher
- Stuart Subotnick (born 1942), American businessman

== Other ==
- The Subotnick Financial Center at Baruch College

=== See also ===
- Subbotnik (disambiguation)
