= Chinik =

Chinik may have one of the following meanings.

- The former name of Golovin, Alaska.
- An alternate spelling of Chainik.
- Yiddish slang for "head" (the literal meaning is "teakettle").
