= Andromeda Star =

Aframax crude oil tanker under the flag of Panama

History

Panama
- Name: Andromeda Star
- Launched: 2009
- In service: 2009
- Identification: IMO number: 9402471; MMSI number: 352003308; Callsign: 3E7471
- Status: In service

General characteristics
- Type: Aframax tanker
- Length: 230 m (754 ft 7 in)
- Capacity: Crude oil 700,000 bbl (110,000,000 L; 29,000,000 US gal)

Andromeda Star is an Aframax crude oil tanker under the flag of Panama. The tanker is part of the Russian Ghost Fleet, transporting Russian crude oil and violating international sanctions.

== Owner ==
The Andromeda Star's owner is not listed on public databases; some International maritime databases list her owner as “reported sold undisclosed interest,” meaning the ships owner isn’t known. Other maretime databases list the Andromeda Star as having been acquired in November 2023 by Algae Marine Inc., a Seychelles-based company, which owns no other vessels.

The ship is managed by Margao Marine Solutions, a "one-person company" based in Goa, India. It is not clear what if any insurance it was carrying.

== History ==
Until November 2022, the Andromeda Star were covered by standard insurance and undergoing regular port-control inspections in Western ports. In 2023 the ship was sold to Margao Marine Solutions as operator and Algae Marine as owner, after which she underwent no more port-control inspections until her later accident with Peace.

The Andromeda Star and the smaller multi-purpose freighter Peace (IMO 9553983) collided on March 2, 2024, in a strait between the Danish islands of Amager and Saltholm in the Öresund. The collision caused only minor damage, but the Andromeda Star had to stay in a shipyard at Funen for around a week. The incident caused a stir in both Denmark and the European Union (EU). The Andromeda Star was en route to the Primorsk port, Russia to load Russian Urals crude. The ship wasn’t carrying the cargo of oil she would have been carrying had she been traveling in the other direction. Had the collision occurred then, according to a report of the atlantic council oil would likely have leaked, causing considerable environmental harm in Danish waters.

This meant that the Andromeda Star merely had to be brought to a Danish shipyard for repairs for little more than twenty days. The inspection completed, the tanker continued to Primorsk and loaded oil. She then traveled through the Baltic Sea to the Suez Canal, but when the tanker reached the Red Sea, Yemen’s Houthi rebels, mistaking her for a British-owned ship. The Houthis fired anti-ballistic missiles at her. The damage, however, was limited and the Andromeda Star continue to the Indian port of Mundra.

In June 2024, the EU placed the Andromeda Star on the EU sanctions list against Russia.
