= Russian embargo of Ukrainian goods =

Russian embargo of Ukrainian goods refers to trade sanctions Russia launched against Ukraine starting in July and August 2013.

That resulted from putting all Ukrainian importers to the "list of risk" by the Federal Customs Service of Russia on 14 August 2013 that resulted the embargo of imports from Ukraine to Russia.

== Timeline of the events ==
=== 2013 ===
In the end of July 2013 Russian customs officers began unreasonable total inspection of all vehicles that transported Ukrainian goods. That forced Ukrainian cargoes idle on the border.

On 29 July 2013 Russian sanitary service has introduced a ban on the supply of products of Roshen company to Russia because of pretended violations found after examination. However, some countries which import the same sweets of Roshen, after their examinations, said they did not find any violations and they have no complaints about the company's products. According to the Basil Yurchishin, who is a Director of Economic Programs of Razumkov Centre, the ban on supply of Roshen production to Russia is a part of Russian policy against Ukraine. This confrontation got a name "Chocolate War".

In the first half of 2013, the Russian part of Ukrainian exports amounted to 23.7%.

From the end of July 2013 to the beginning of a full embargo about 40 Ukrainian companies were put to the "list of risk" of Russian customs.

On 14 August 2013 the Federal Customs Service of Russia put all Ukrainian importers to the "list of risk". These actions resulted in embargo of imports from Ukraine to Russia. Lines of hundreds of trucks and railcars with Ukrainian goods began to form at the border checkpoints from Ukraine to Russia. For example, on 15 August on one of the control points (Bryansk-Lgovskiy Station) about 1 000 cars with Ukrainian cargoes were suspended. A number of Ukrainian companies, including suppliers of fruits and vegetables, poultry, confectionery, wines and steel products, reported having problems with customs clearance of their goods at the border with Russia. The "Obolon" company suspended all export to Russia.

On 18 August 2013 Adviser to the President Sergey Glazyev said that if Ukraine signs Association Agreement with the European Union customs policy for Ukrainian companies would be made more strict.

On 19 August 2013 Ministry of income and charges of Ukraine and Federal Customs Service of Russia during the negotiations agreed that additional customs control for Ukrainian goods will not be applied any more, products of Ukrainian companies will cross the Russian customs in normal mode.

On 20 August 2013 Ministry of income and charges Ukraine and the Federal Customs Service of Russia announced the end of the trade war.

On 21 August 2013 Prime Minister of Ukraine Mykola Azarov said that the Federal Customs Service of Russia brought their apologizes to companies, that faced the problems with supply of goods from Ukraine to Russia.

Meanwhile, Russian customs continued to work with "additional control procedures".

On 20 September 2013 it was reported that the Russian customs let Ukrainian goods pass normally, without additional procedures. It was reported by "Ukrinform" referring to the government commissioner for cooperation with the Russian Federation, members of CIS, EurAsEC and other regional associations Valery Muntiyan.

On 17 October 2013 the Minister of Agrarian Policy and Food of Ukraine Mykola Prysyazhnyuk reported that customs control of Ukrainian confectionery increases again on the border with Russia.

On 31 October 2013 it was reported that the relevant authorities of the Russian Federation launched new measures for the "enforcement of customs regulations for goods imported into the territory of the Customs Union." Because of this, many trucks with Ukrainian goods could not enter the territory of Russia.

On 12 November 2013 Russia introduced new regulations for transporting of goods through the Russia–Ukraine border that forced queues of trucks to form again.

=== 2014 ===
On the night of 28 to 29 January 2014 Russia tightened customs control procedures. This was stated by the Association of International Road Carriers and Federation of Employers of Ukraine. Almost all cargoes going from Ukraine to Russia, now have to be carefully checked. The carrier must unload all products at the border at his own expense. Then they must be weighted, checked for certificates of conformity. The whole procedure of the registration can last up to 15 days.

In the beginning of April 2014, Russia banned imports of Ukrainian sweets, chocolate and cheese, and blocked the transit of Ukrainian sugar to the Central Asia. In response, Ukraine rejected Russian chocolates, cheese and fish.

Early December 2014 500 trucks with Russian coal were barred from entering Ukraine for several days although Ukrainian officials stated they "fulfilled our payment liabilities in full".

== Reactions ==
=== Public reaction ===
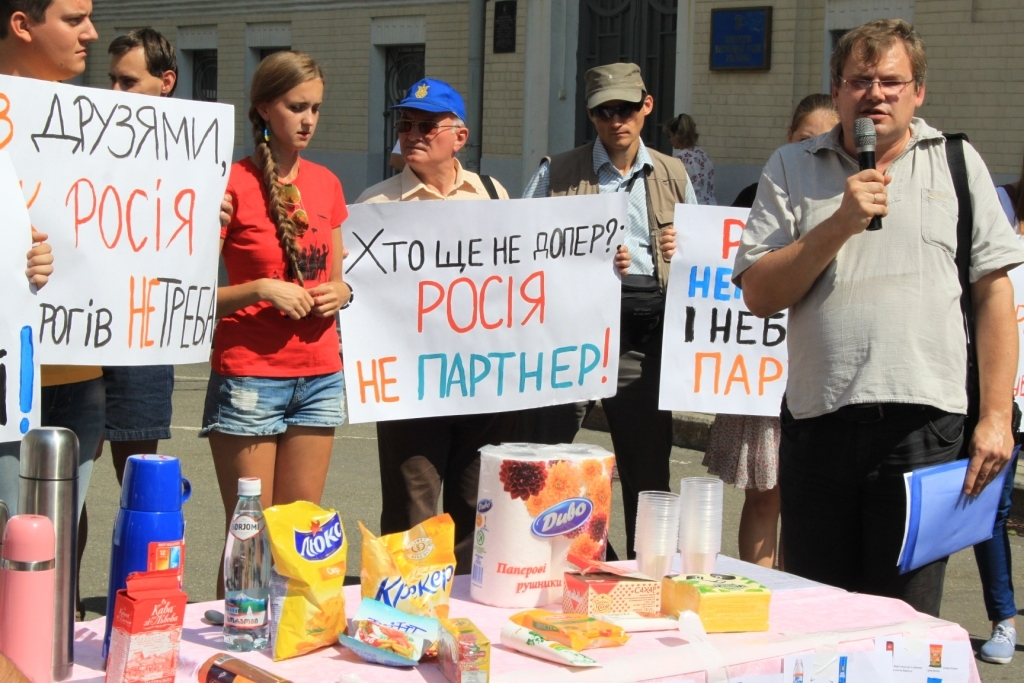
Action of movement "Vidsich" near the Presidential Administration of Ukraine with demand to give appropriate response to the trade embargo of Ukraine by Russia, 22 August 2013

On 14 August 2013, short after the beginning of the embargo, civic movement "Vidsich" called in Social Networks for a boycott of Russian goods to respond the embargo of Ukrainian goods. This message had massively spread in social networks. On 22 August near the Presidential Administration of Ukraine activists held an action during which announced the launch of campaign of boycott of Russian goods. Activists launched a massive campaign on the Internet to attract volunteers and activists to work. From 24 August they massively distributed leaflets calling for a boycott in dozens of cities in Ukraine. Since November activists also begun to distribute leaflets calling for not buying goods in Russian stores and not being served in Russian banks. Activists distributing leaflets often faced resistance and attacks from unknown persons, private security or police officers. Since the beginning of Euromaidan in November 2013 campaign lost its scope. However, activists announced the restoration of campaign in March 2014 after the beginning of the Russian annexation of Crimea.

=== International response ===
On 28 August 2013 the European Parliament Committee on Foreign Affairs held an emergency meeting on the situation in Egypt and Ukraine. The initiator of the extraordinary session was chairman of the committee Elmar Brok. Committee supported Ukraine in trade conflict with Russia. It was decided to raise that issue on the G20 summit in Saint Petersburg and pass a resolution about the support of Ukraine.

Government of Germany, commenting the trade embargo, called on Russia to respect the right of Ukraine for the close relationship with European Union.

On 12 September 2013 The European Parliament have adopted the resolution on Russia's pressure on the countries of Eastern Partnership and called on the European Union leadership to protect Ukraine, Moldova and Armenia. The European Parliament called on the European Commission and the European External Action Service to consider Russia's actions being beyond the economy and being in a political dimension.

On 25 September 2013 the European Parliament supported the introduction of restrictions against the import of Russian goods in response to the same actions against countries of Eastern Partnership. If Russia introduces visa restrictions for citizens of these countries it will get "mirrored" measures for their citizens. In addition, the European Parliament Committee on Foreign Affairs asked to ensure compliance with the European laws by Russian companies.

On 23 November 2013, after the announcement by Cabinet of Ukraine about suspension of the process of signing of association agreement with the EU and after the beginning of Euromaidan, Chancellor of Germany Angela Merkel said she wants to talk to the president Vladimir Putin about stopping the pressure on Ukraine.

== Causes ==
According to the investigation of "Zerkalo Nedeli" newspaper, the reason for the embargo of Ukrainian production is pressure on the Ukrainian government to disrupt the signing of association agreement with the EU, scheduled to sign at the November 2013, Vilnius Summit. The newspaper describes the events as opening of the first front of "economic war" against Ukraine. This is indicated in the investigation that Russia wants to maintain its influence over Ukraine.

=== Opinions of experts and politicians ===
- Ukrainian political scientist, political strategist, analyst and director of the Institute of Global Strategies Vadim Karasyov said:

Reason for such actions of Russia is Ukraine's intent to sign Association Agreement and Free Trade Area Agreement with the European Union. That is European integration to EU. Thats why Russia if not to disrupt then to complicate process of signing of Association Agreement between Ukraine and EU at the Vilnius Summit of Eastern Partnership in November of 2013 starts total economic embargo of Ukraine instead of local temporary trade conflicts.

- Prime Minister of Ukraine Mykola Azarov
  - Linkins problems in trade relations with Russia with the development and structuring of "Customs Union" (15 August 2013)
  - "Customs problems with the supply of Ukrainian goods to Russia occurred because the Ukrainian companies did not react on warnings of Russian customs about possible regime change." (21 August 2013)
- Minister for Foreign Affairs of Sweden Carl Bildt said that Russia started trade confrontation with Ukraine to block its relations with the European Union (16 August 2013).
- Foreign Minister of Lithuania Linas Linkyavichus called the introduction of intensive inspections of all Ukrainian goods crossing the Russian border a clear response to Ukraine's intends to sign an Association Agreement with the EU.
- Russian analyst Alexei Portanskiy, Professor of Department of World Economy and World Politics of the High School of Economy suggests that in a such hard way Russia is trying to make it clear to Ukraine that Ukraine's economic interests are in the Russian market.
- Co-Chairman of "Business Russia" Anton Danilov-Danilyan:

I do not think this story has a political background. The actions of our customs on the Russian-Ukrainian border show that they decided to discover where we have the most significant shortfall in imports, and plug these holes.

- According to the chairman of the State Duma Committee for CIS Leonid Slutsky, this is just a bureaucratic issue because Ukraine is not a member of the Customs Union. Slutsky hopes that by the end of August 2013 the customs services of the both countries will overcome all difficulties.
- A member of the political council of Party of Regions Aleksey Plotnikov stated that the current trade and economic situation between Ukraine and Russia must not be qualified as war, only as a manifestation of panic of Russia which have lost (2 September 2013).
- According to the former President of Ukraine Viktor Yushchenko, trade war which was really launched by Russia, is a manifestation of trying to achieve political goals by the means of economic blackmail, and the real purpose is permanent elimination of independence of Ukraine.

== Effects ==
According to the Federation of Employers of Ukraine in the beginning of the embargo the loss for Ukraine from the Russia's actions can reach $2–2,5 billion in the second half of 2013.

According to Ukrainian experts as for 22 August 2013 the 10-days embargo on the Russian border can hit some manufacturers, but the scale of losses in whole Ukraine is only ₴500 million. Experts also believe that the unpredictable behaviour of Russia will force Ukrainian businessmen to seek new markets for their products, as well as make supporters of joining the "Customs Union" change their mind.

On 24 August 2013 on Radio "Liberty" MP of European Parliament Pawel Kowal published an article in which he suggested that the situation of tension in relations between Ukraine and Russia is just the beginning of the pressure that will continue and increase.

Sociologist, Director of "Democratic initiatives" Irina Bekeshkina said that Ukraine at the end of August 2013 is winning information war with Russia. However, according to experts, Russia will enhance the information and economic impact on Ukraine. Senior Advisor to the Russian Embassy in Ukraine Igor Sevastiyanov indirectly confirmed this statement, saying this embargo is "training".

Also, according to Radio "Liberty" with reference to the heads of the companies in the end of August 2013 it was reported that some Ukrainian companies through the trade confrontation between Ukraine and Russia are shifting to other markets. Some companies do not feel any problems with exports.

Representatives of EU said they are ready to introduce additional steps to support Ukraine - from simplification of visa for Ukraine to financial help. Also, EU thinks about complication of access to European market for Russian goods.

== See also ==
- 2005–06 Russia–Ukraine gas dispute
- Ukraine–European Union Association Agreement
- Annexation of Crimea by the Russian Federation
