= Daniel Subotnik =

Legal scholar, early skeptic of critical race theory

Daniel Subotnik (born 1942; deceased 2024) was a Professor of Law at the Touro Law Center who wrote extensively about race and gender theory. He is the author of Toxic Diversity: Race, Gender, and Law Talk. and an early skeptic of critical race theory as interpreted by legal scholars.

== Personal life and education ==
Subotnik is the son of a European refugee father (Louis Subotnik) and an Egypt-born French mother (Emma Subotnik, née Bouskela). He earned a BA degree from Columbia University in 1963 and a JD–MBA dual degree from Columbia Law School in 1966. He is married to Rose Rosengard Subotnik, an American musicologist at Brown University. They have two children.

== Race and gender ==
In 1998, Subotnik published one of the earliest critiques of critical race theory (CRT). His article, "What’s Wrong with Critical Race Theory: Reopening the Case for Middle Class Values," highlighted many exaggerated claims originating within the burgeoning CRT community. More generally, while accepting some aspects of critical race theory, Subotnik warned of communal dangers that could arise if modern day race relations are equated with circumstances one or two hundred years earlier. He has argued that white academics can and must have a role to play in a field dominated by minority voices, and that academic CRT scholars must reckon with changes in the racial landscape in America.

In 2005, Subotnik published Toxic Diversity, where he offered numerous examples of what he deemed problematic CRT—as well as feminist—academic scholarship.

Subotnik has publicly disagreed with Richard Delgado, one of the founders of CRT, though the two have found a common language publishing a back-and-forth dialogue.

== Selected writings ==
- Subotnik, Daniel (1998) "What’s Wrong with Critical Race Theory: Reopening the Case for Middle Class Values," Cornell Journal of Law and Public Policy: Vol. 7 : Iss. 3, Article 1.
- Subotnik, Dan (1998) "The Joke Critical Race Theory: De Gustibus Disputandum Est?," Touro Law Review: Vol. 15 : No. 1, Article 4
- Subotnik, Dan, and Glen Lazar (1999). "Deconstructing the Rejection Letter: A Look at Elitism in Article Selection." J. Legal Educ. 49: 601
- Subotnik, Dan (2021). "Maybe Law Schools Do Not Oppress Minority Faculty Women: A Critique of Meera E. Deo’s 'Unequal Profession: Race and Gender in Legal Academia'". Touro Law School, Vol. 37, Number 2.
