= Do not buy Russian goods! =

Ukrainian resistance campaign to boycott Russian commerce

- Не купуй російське!
- One of the images used in leaflets, stickers, and posters calling for a boycott of Russian goods
- Predecessor: Remember about the Gas – Do not buy Russian goods!
- Formation: 14 August 2013; 2 March 2014
- Founder: Vidsich
- Type: Civic campaign
- Locations: Ukraine; Smaller protests: Poland; Lithuania
- Subsidiaries: Boycott Russian Films
- Website: vidsich.info

"Do not buy Russian goods!" (Ukrainian: Не купуй російське!, romanized: Ne kupui rosiiske!) or "Boycott Russian goods!" (Ukrainian: Бойкотуй російське!, romanized: Boikotui rosiiske!) is a nonviolent resistance campaign to boycott Russian commerce in Ukraine. The protest started on 14 August 2013 as a reaction to a Russian trade embargo against Ukrainian goods. It was organized by Vidsich on social media. The campaign expanded to mass distribution of leaflets, posters, and stickers in over 45 cities and towns. Having faded by the beginning of the Euromaidan demonstrations in November 2013, it was renewed on 2 March 2014, during the annexation of Crimea by the Russian Federation and the Russo-Ukrainian War.

== Causes ==
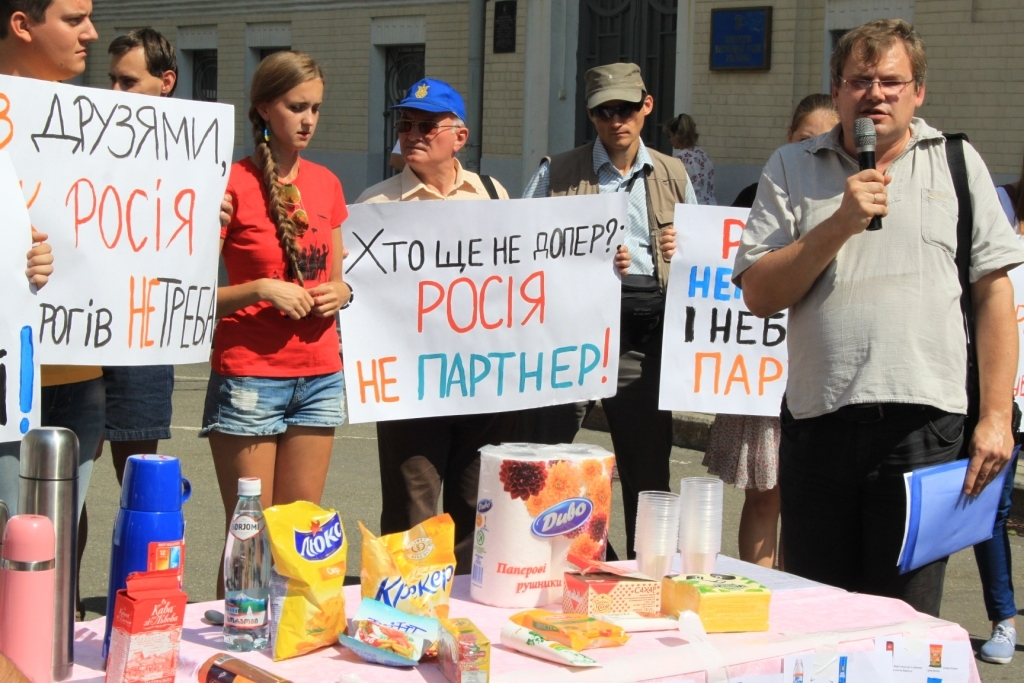
Activists urging boycott on 22 August 2013 in response to Russia's blockade of Ukrainian goods

The campaign began as a response to a series of economic wars launched by Russia against Ukraine, including the "Meat War", the "Cheese War", and the "Chocolate War". On 14 August 2013, the Federal Customs Service of Russia listed all Ukrainian exporters as companies "at risk", resulting in a blockade of Ukrainian products imported to Russia. A backup developed at customs involving hundreds of truckloads and railcars of Ukrainian goods.

== Boycotts ==
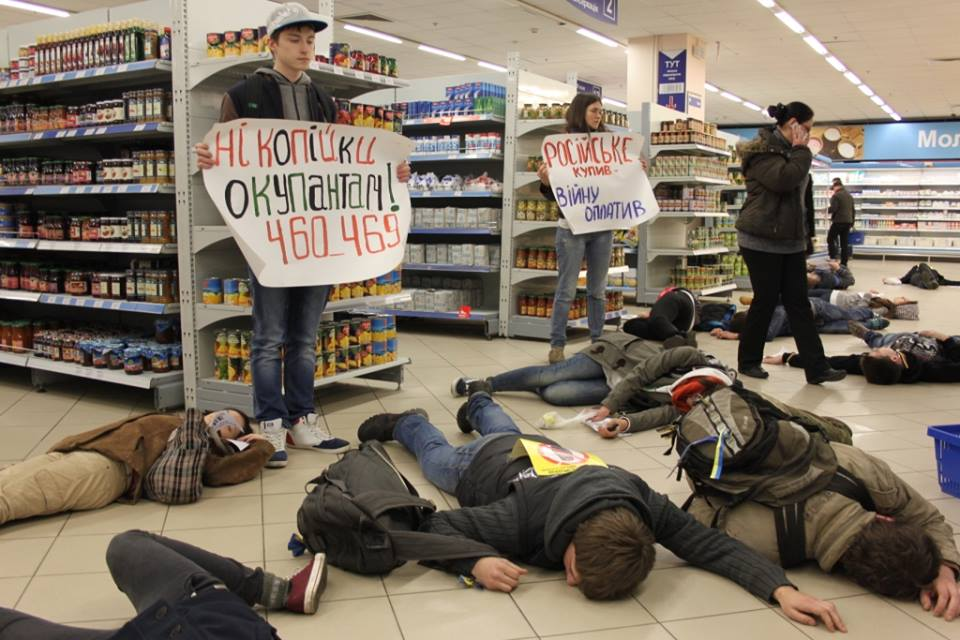
Flash mob in a Kyiv supermarket on 15 March 2014

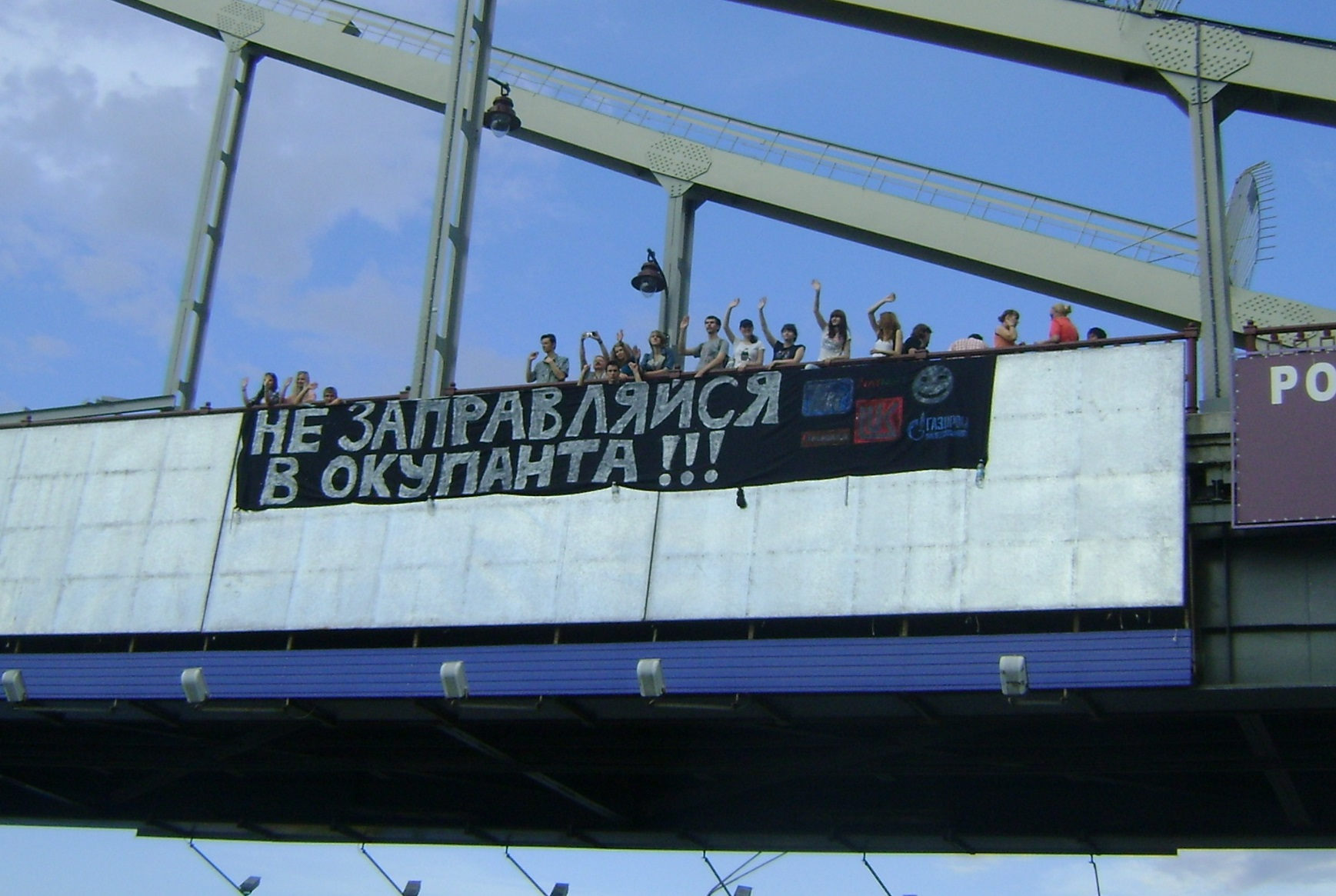
Activists display a banner urging a boycott of Russian gasoline on 29 May 2014.

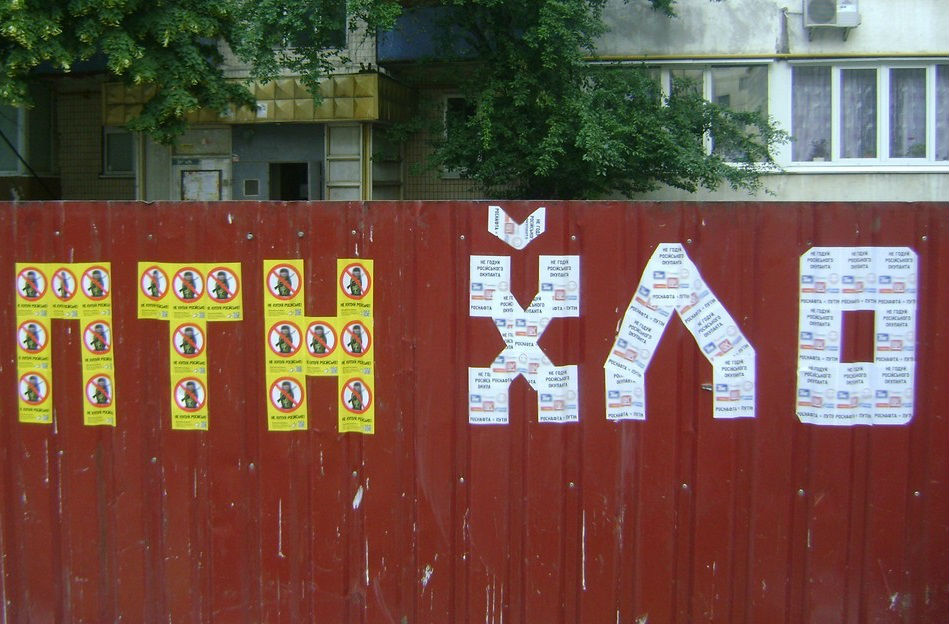
Boycott campaign stickers used to write "ПТН X̆ЛО" (abbreviation of "Putin khuilo!") in Brovary. 22 June 2014

=== In Ukraine ===
On 22 August 2013, activists held a protest near the Presidential Administration of Ukraine. The campaign continued with a mass distribution of leaflets, posters and stickers in more than 45 cities and towns in Ukraine. Caricatures of Russian Matryoshka dolls have been used in the campaign. The campaign began to decline with the beginning of Euromaidan.

On 2 March 2014, activists used social networks to announce the renewal of the boycott on any goods and services that benefit Russian companies. The intention was to keep Ukrainian money from going to Russia where it could be used to support the Russian military. The boycott was launched in response to the Crimean crisis and the Russian military intervention in Ukraine.

In March 2014, activists began organizing flash mobs in supermarkets to urge customers not to buy Russian goods and to boycott Russian gas stations, banks, and concerts. In April 2014, some movie theaters in Kyiv, Lviv, and Odesa stopped showing Russian films.

By April 2014, some Russian manufacturers changed their barcodes from Russian to Ukrainian. Titled Boycott Invaders, an Android app was developed to identify products from Russia, including those disguising their origin.

In the summer of 2014, activists in Kyiv began organizing more flash mobs and other demonstrations in Russian restaurants and coffeehouses.

Towards the end of August 2014, activists started a campaign called "Boycott Russian Films" against Russian movies and serials on Ukrainian media space.

Andriy Dlihach, CEO of the "Advanter Group", urged consumers not to boycott Russian products, but to concentrate on buying Ukrainian goods instead.

On August 19, 2015, activists of the "Vidsich" movement threatened to launch a campaign to boycott Nestlé during a rally near the corporation's office in Kyiv. A discrimination case against a Ukrainian-speaking journalist who was not hired because of language requirements sparked the campaign. Activists also criticized that Nestlé still sold products manufactured by Russia in Ukraine. In September, flash mobs called "Russian Kills!" took place in Kyiv against these products.

=== International spread ===
Beginning in March 2014, the boycott spread to Poland and Lithuania.

Following the 2022 invasion of Ukraine, all major Danish supermarkets stopped selling Russian goods. In the United States, the states of New Hampshire and Ohio, where state governments control liquor sales, announced that they would remove Russian-made vodka from sale. Similar measures were also called for in Virginia. The Canadian province of Ontario also ordered Russian-made products removed from its Liquor Control Board of Ontario stores, with similar measures enacted in Manitoba and Newfoundland and Labrador.

=== Banking ===
The US Department of State added many Russian banks to its sanction list on 24 February 2023 in response to its aggression toward Ukraine. SWIFT, a key messaging tool for financial trading, has disconnected Russia from its services as well. Sanctions have caused Russians to rely on their currency and experience long lines at ATM machines. No runs on banks have been reported. Those who rely on international travel have experienced inconvenience over the sanctions. Russian issued credit cards by Visa and Mastercard do not work. They rely on Mir.

== Results ==
Sales of Russian goods in Ukraine decreased by 35–50% in the spring of 2014. In May 2014, Ukrainian supermarkets began to abandon the procurement of Russian goods. Delivery of goods from Russia fell by a third.

In April 2014, it was reported that producers from the Russian Federation were changing Russian barcodes with barcodes of other countries, in an effort to circumvent the boycott. Moreover, several instances of illegal masking of Russian products were found in some Ukrainian supermarkets.

From January to May 2014, according to Standard & Poor's ratings, banks with Russian capital in Ukraine lost more than 50% of their deposits.

According to comparison test of Russian TV series watching ratings in Ukraine for 2013 (sample by GfK) and for 2014 (sample by Nielsen), total ratings dropped by a third.

As of mid of May 2014, it is known that Ukrainian supermarkets have started to massively abandon purchases of Russian goods. Supply amounts from Russian Federation decreased by a third.

== Public opinion ==
According to Taylor Nelson Sofres (TNS) Internet research in Ukraine, in March–April 2014, 52% of Ukrainians were positive or "rather positive" about the boycott of Russian products. According to the survey, 39% of Ukrainians were involved in the boycott. A further survey campaign revealed that from July to August 2014, support for the boycott increased from 52% to 57%, and participation in the boycott increased from 40% to 46% of the population. According to data reported by TSN, in September 2014, 50% of Ukrainians had joined the boycott.

== Criticism ==
The boycott was not supported by Ukrainian retail offices of Auchan Ukraine and Metro Cash and Carry. The companies explained that this was due to their apolitical vision.

Ukrainian and Russian-speaking blogger Danylo Vakhovskyi said that he consciously uses Russian internet services and will continue to do so, because it is a way to support "the creation of a favorable environment for entrepreneurship" in Russia. Vakhovskyi admitted that such usage was "not patriotic", but still considered his support of entrepreneurs as providing opportunities to change the world for the better.

== See also ==
- 1933 anti-Nazi boycott
- Boycotts of Chinese products
- Boycott, Divestment and Sanctions
- Boycotts of Japanese products
- Don't! Buy! Thai!
- Great American Boycott
- International sanctions during the Russo-Ukrainian War
- Magnitsky Act
- Russian financial crisis (2014–2016)
- Nonviolent resistance
