= Patatnik =

Bulgarian potato dish

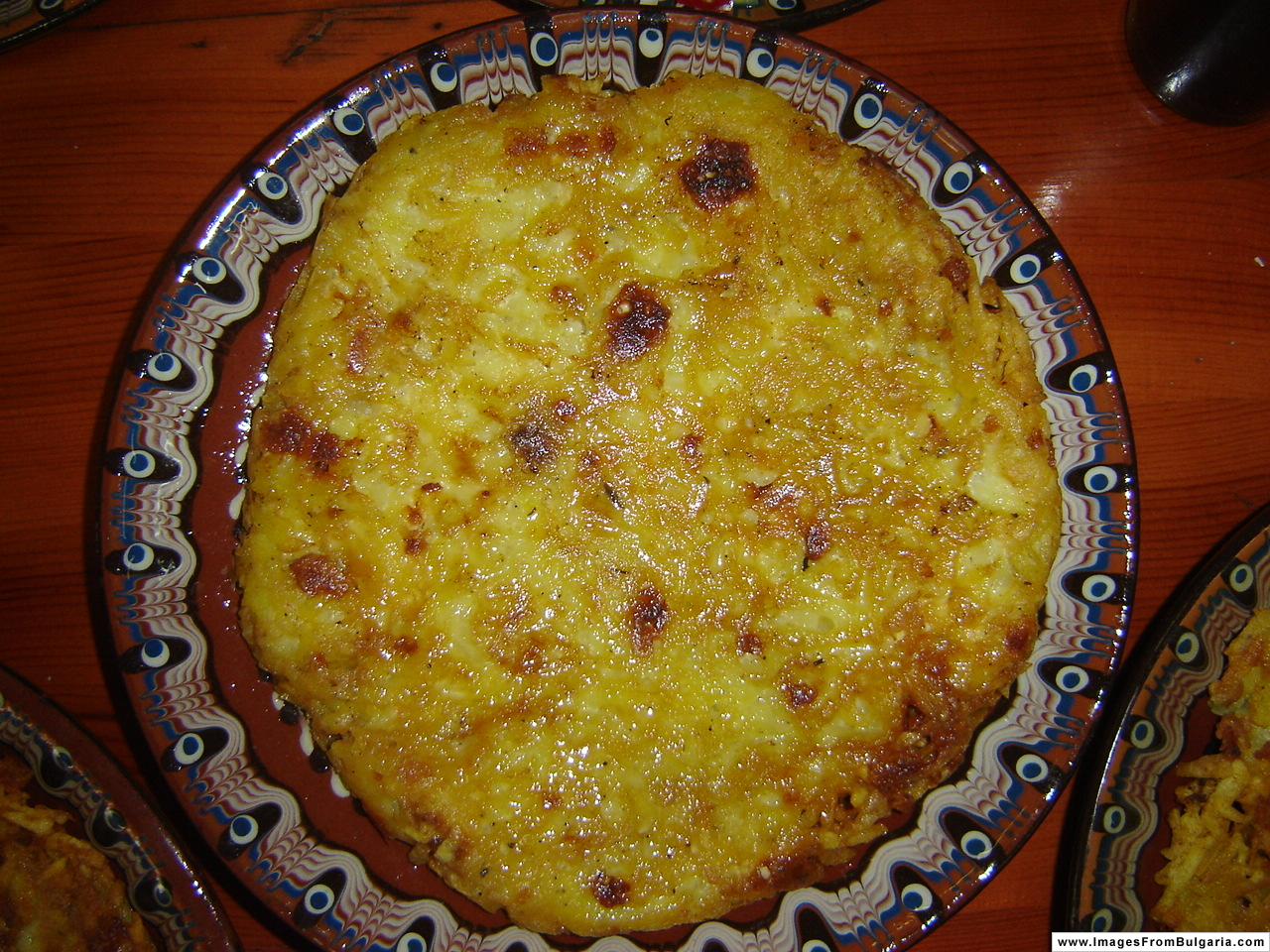
- Place of origin: Bulgaria
- Region or state: Rhodope Mountains
- Main ingredients: Potatoes, onions, eggs, salt, spearmint

Patatnik or patetnik (Bulgarian: пататник or патетник) is a Bulgarian potato dish characteristic of the Rhodope Mountains in the country's central south. Patatnik is made of grated potatoes, onions, salt and a type of very mild mint called gyosum in Bulgarian, all mixed and cooked on a slow fire. Some restaurants add sirene (white cheese) or eggs, but this is not traditional; some people also use savory and peppers.

The grated potatoes are squeezed out and mixed with the onions. Some of the doughy mixture that has formed is rolled into two sheets. One of the sheets is placed on the bottom of the dish and should be larger in diameter than it so as it comes out a fair bit. The remaining mixture is spiced with savory, poured on top of the first sheet, covered with the other sheet; the edges of both sheets should cover each other: in that respect, it resembles a potato banitsa. According to one of the preparation methods, the patatnik is turned over when the bottom is well cooked and slipped into the dish with the heated side. According to other recipes, no sheets are formed and instead the ingredients are mixed until they become homogeneous; these are then cooked in a deep dish on a slow fire. After 20 minutes the mixture is turned over and covered and then cooked further.

The dish is traditional for the entire Rhodopes and the nearby regions, from Bansko in Pirin through Smolyan and Zlatograd to as far east as Chernichevo. The name is derived from the local word patato or pateto, "potato", with the Bulgarian masculine suffix –nik. The word is typical for the Rup dialects spoken in the Rhodopes. It is distinct from both standard Bulgarian kartof (картоф) and the western Bulgarian kompir (компир). In Nedelino, the dish is known as kashnitsa (кашница).
