= Vatnik =

Person receptive to Russian propaganda

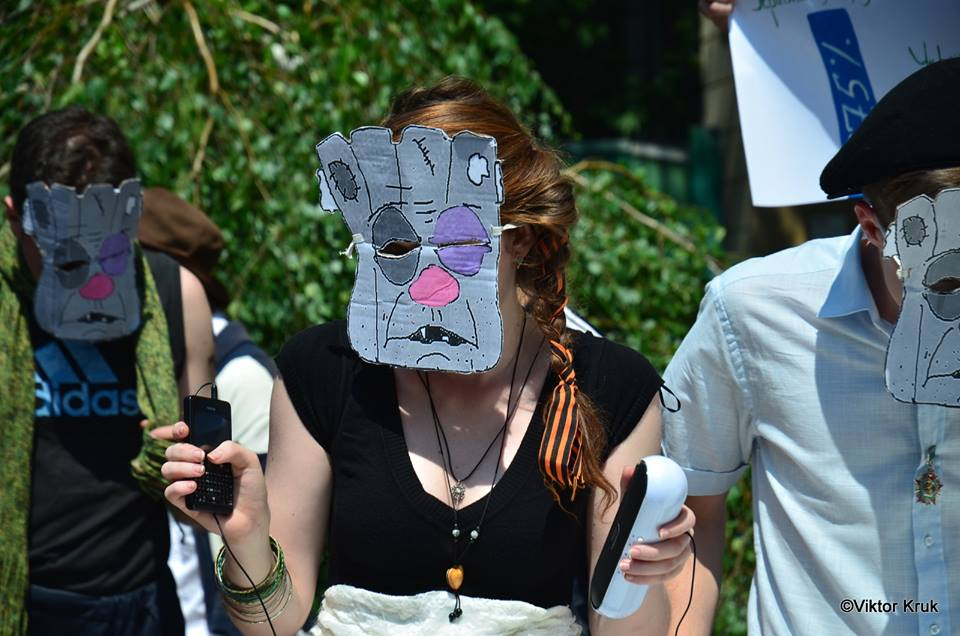
Activists in Ukraine using the image of "Vatnik" in the action of "Boycott Russian Films" campaign (2015)

Vatnik (Russian: ватник, pronounced [ˈvatnʲɪk]) is a political pejorative used in Russia and other post-Soviet states for steadfast jingoistic followers of propaganda from the Russian government.

The use of the word originates from an Internet meme first spread by Anton Chadsky on VKontakte in 2011, and later used in Russia, Ukraine, and then in other post-Soviet states. Its meaning refers to the original cartoon, which depicts a character made from the material of a padded cotton wool (ва́та, Russian pronunciation: [ˈvatə]) jacket (Russian: вáтник, romanized: vatnik) and bearing a black eye, which is used to disparage someone as a blindly patriotic and unintelligent jingoist who pushes the conventional views presented in Russian government media as well as those of Russian web brigades. The name "Vatnik" derives from the cotton wool jacket (Telogreika) that Chadsky's cartoon character in the meme is made from.

== Etymology ==
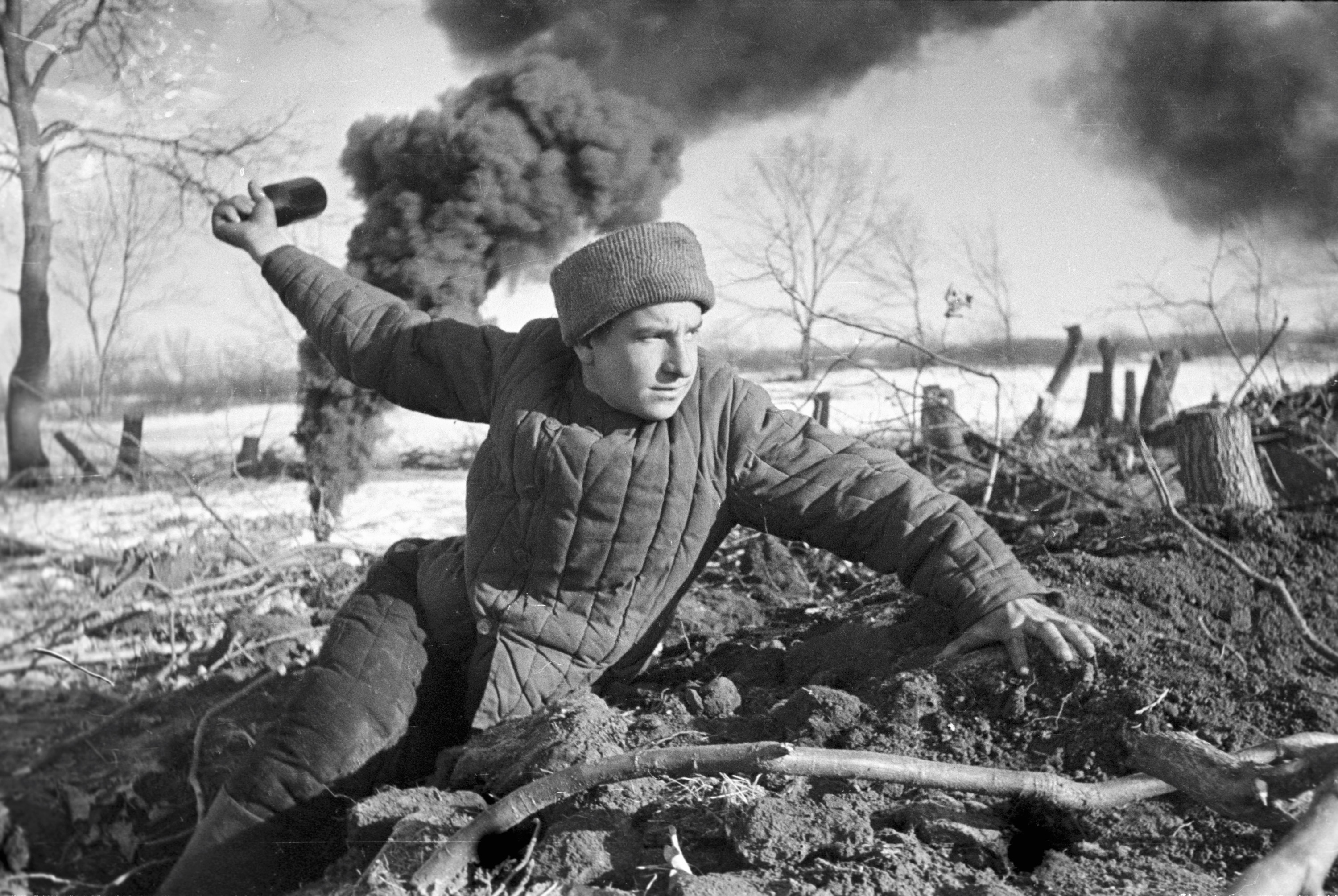
A Soviet soldier wearing a quilted woolen jacket during the Battle of Stalingrad

The Russian word vata, for cotton wool is derived from the French ouate, or wadding in English, with the earliest recorded use in the 18th century. This is combined with the suffix -nik denoting an agent noun. Other words which have entered the English lexicon include sputnik and peacenik. By the 1930s, the term had become associated with "low status professions" such as soldiers, farmers and prisoners.

In World War II padded jackets were issued en masse to Soviet forces due to the harsh conditions of the Eastern Front . Following the war, the padded woolen jacket became a symbol of mass participation, resilience and the ability to endure harsh conditions. Telogreika continued to be frequently used by the working class: demobilised soldiers, prisoners, and construction and industrial workers.

== History ==
The meme was created by the Russian shock artist Anton "Chadsky" Konovalov under the pseudonym Jedem das Seine. Konovalov had previously operated several provocative groups on VK such as "Drang nach Osten" and "Anti-Gaddafi", expressing sympathy for the American-led world order, and hatred of the "Russian world". His associated picture of an anthropomorphic version of the "vatnik" jacket similar to the title character of SpongeBob SquarePants was posted on VK for the first time on 9 September 2011. In 2012, the meme became widely popular on the Internet. Chadsky created a group for the character on VK called RASHKA – THE SQUARE VATNIK. Rashka is a derogatory nickname for Russia, derived from the English pronunciation of the country's name with the Russian -k- diminutive suffix attached. Chadsky's original drawing has been reproduced and modified many times. Features that are consistently included are gray color, a red nose from drinking vodka, and a black eye, presumably from a fistfight with another vatnik.

The meme became much more widespread in society after the Russo-Ukrainian War started in 2014. We will not let the Russian vata into our homes (Note: Ukrainian: «Не пустимо в хату російську вату») was the name of a protest held as part of the "Boycott Russian Films" campaign in Ukraine in 2014. In late 2014, the comedy television show VATA TV (original: ВАТА TV) was shown in Ukraine. It was devoted to the "vata" phenomenon. It was hosted by the popular 5 Kanal host Viktor Lytovchenko.

In late 2014, Konovalov left his government job in Novorossiysk after receiving a warning that "the special services were interested" in him for his pro-Ukrainian stance and activities. Konovalov would temporarily relocate to Kaliningrad, before moving to Kyiv in Ukraine, and planning to move to Berlin at the time. Later due to financial difficulties, it was reported that Konovalov had relocated to Odesa.

In December 2014, Konovalov was a topic of outrage on the Runet for hosting an event in Kyiv named "Junta and Vata" alongside members of the ultranationalist party Svoboda, wherein he eats a cake in the shape of a baby draped in a Russian tricolour flag. Later in 2025, Konovalov would also host an art exhibition depicting Russians in cages with pieces of cake from the character Rashka distributed to visitors. As a result of this, as well as additional online posts, Konovalov was charged in absentia under hate speech legislation of the Criminal Code of Russia. In November 2016, the VKontakte page "RASHKA – THE SQUARE VATNIK" was blocked following a ruling by the Kuibyshevsky District Court of Omsk.

In February 2017, a Russian teenager from Saratov was sentenced to 160 hours of community service for espousing hateful language online, in calling for a "vatnik holocaust". The defendant pleaded guilty and stated that he regretted his actions.

Following the election of Volodymyr Zelenskyy in 2019, Oleksii Arestovych criticised his ability to govern, stating that the President acted from the mindset of "an ordinary Krivog Rog vatnik", a play on Zelenskyy's statements during the campaign, describing himself as "an ordinary guy from Krivoy Rog". Arestovych's statements would again gain attention when he became a spin doctor for the Presidential administration in 2020.

The anti-Russian internet group NAFO uses the Vatnik slang and imagery very commonly in English-language tweets and memes. When a disabled Russian T-72 was publicly displayed in Vilnius in February 2023, Lithuanian President Gitanas Nausėda emphasised using it to "see the vatniks" who came to mourn its capture.

== Reappropriation ==
The term has been "quickly reappropriated" and is used as a positive self-descriptor by some pro-government Russian bloggers. The proud name "vatnik" (Note: Russian: Гордое имя – «ватник») was one of the topics at essays and scientific works competition in the Altai State Pedagogical University, that was dedicated to the 70th anniversary of the Soviet Union victory in the Second World War in 2015.

Quilted jackets have seen a resurgence in popularity in recent years, embraced by fashion designers such as the Saint Petersburg based Vatnique. Crimean prosecutor Natalya Poklonskaya was gifted a quilted jacket following a television interview. In 2019, the Russian news network RT began selling quilted jackets as merchandise.

== Variations ==
The word also exists in Ukrainian as ватник (vatnyk), in Belarusian as ватнік (vatnik), in Latvian as (vatņiks), in Lithuanian as (vatnikas), in Czech as vaťák, and in Polish as waciak. Its plural in English is "vatniks", or less commonly, "vata", via a direct transliteration of the Russian collective ва́та.

- Vyshyvatnik (Russian: вышиватник, romanized: vyshivatnik) is an equivalent insult for an overly patriotic Ukrainian, and is a blend of "vatnik" and vyshyvanka, a traditional type of Ukrainian embroidered shirt.

== Analysis ==
Journalist Vadim Nikitin, writing for American socialist magazine Jacobin, has criticized the trope of the uneducated, working-class "vatnik" Putin supporter as classist and inaccurate, writing that it "whitewashes and elides the essential role played by the middle and upper-middle classes in bringing about and sustaining Putinism". He described the trope as the latest iteration of a long history of social elitism within Russian liberalism in which it is believed that "only a miniscule [sic] elite – the intelligentsia – was capable of awakening and stewarding the mute, slumbering masses." He compared the term to Hillary Clinton's use of the phrase "basket of deplorables" to describe some supporters of Donald Trump.

The political scientist Nerija Putinaitė states that while the term was originally used to refer to people uncritically loyal to the Russian world view, in Lithuania the term has broadened to label anyone with unpopular or dissenting views, often unrelated to Russia, such as left wing critics of neoliberal economic policies, labour law protests and teachers strikes. Putinaitė warns that this kind of labeling replaces argument with mockery, reinforces an "us and them" mindset, and stigmatizes socially weaker or marginal groups. As a result, the term harms democratic discussion by deepening social divisions and discouraging genuine dialogue.

== See also ==
- Angry patriots
- Banderite
- Little Pink (rough Chinese equivalent)
- Mankurt
- Moskal
- Orc (slang)
- Putinversteher
- Ruscism
- Russophobia
- Tankie
