= Kukuruznik =

Kukuruznik (Russian: Кукурузник) is a Russian word derived from "kukuruza", maize. It was used as a nickname for the following:

- Polikarpov Po-2, a utility aircraft used extensively in agriculture
- Antonov An-2, a purpose-built agricultural aircraft
- Nikita Khrushchev, leader of the Soviet Union, known for indiscriminately introducing maize throughout the Soviet Union

== See also ==
- Ural Airlines Flight 178
