= Voskresnik =

Voskresnik may refer to:

- Voskresnik (day), a day of volunteer unpaid work on Sunday after the October Revolution
- Voskresnik (liturgy), a Slavonic liturgical book of Eastern Christian hymns
