= Subbotnik (disambiguation) =

Subbotnik may refer to:

- Subbotnik, a volunteer workday on a Saturday in the Soviet Union
- Subbotnik Festival, an annual international music festival held in Moscow, Russia
- Subbotniks, the common name for Russian Judaizers sects

== See also ==
- Subotnick (disambiguation)
