= Boycotts of Japanese products =

Movements when Chinese or Korean consumers have stopped buying from Japan

Boycotts of Japanese products have been conducted by numerous Korean, Chinese and American civilian and governmental organizations in response to real or disputed Japanese aggression and atrocities, whether military, political or economic.

== 20th century ==
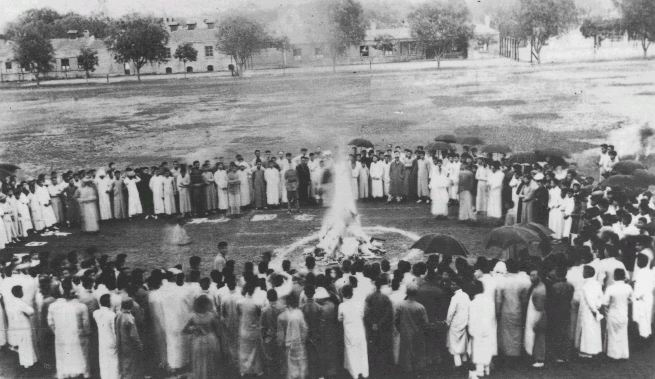
Burning of Japanese products at Tsinghua University during the May Fourth Movement

The first boycott of Japanese products in China was started 1915 as a result of public indignation at the Twenty-One Demands which Japan forced China to accept. In 1919, the students and intellectuals involved in the May Fourth Movement called for another boycott of Japanese products, developing into a mass movement across China, including general strikes.

The Jinan Incident of 1928 prompted a new boycott. This time, the Kuomintang government mobilised the Chinese population to cease economic dealings with Japan. From then on, anti-Japanese protests in China would always be accompanied with boycotts of Japanese products.

The Japanese invasion of China in 1931 and the conquest of Manchuria were roundly criticized in the United States. In addition, efforts by citizens outraged at Japanese atrocities, such as the Nanking Massacre, led to calls for American economic intervention to encourage Japan to leave China; these calls played a role in shaping American foreign policy. As more and more unfavorable reports of Japanese actions came to the attention of the American government, embargoes on oil and other supplies were placed on Japan, out of concern for the Chinese populace and for American interests in the Pacific. The American public became increasingly pro-Chinese and anti-Japanese, an example being a grassroots campaign for women to stop buying silk stockings because the material was procured from Japan through its colonies.

After World War II, the Chinese community, which was upset over various issues such as the sovereignty of Senkaku Islands, the Japanese history textbook controversies and Japanese leaders' visits to Yasukuni Shrine, would launch boycotts of Japanese products.

Taiwanese citizens started a boycott in September 1972 to protest Japan's diplomatic recognition of the People's Republic of China and twice burned Japanese products in front of the Taipei City Hall, which was coincidentally of Japanese construction.

== 21st century ==
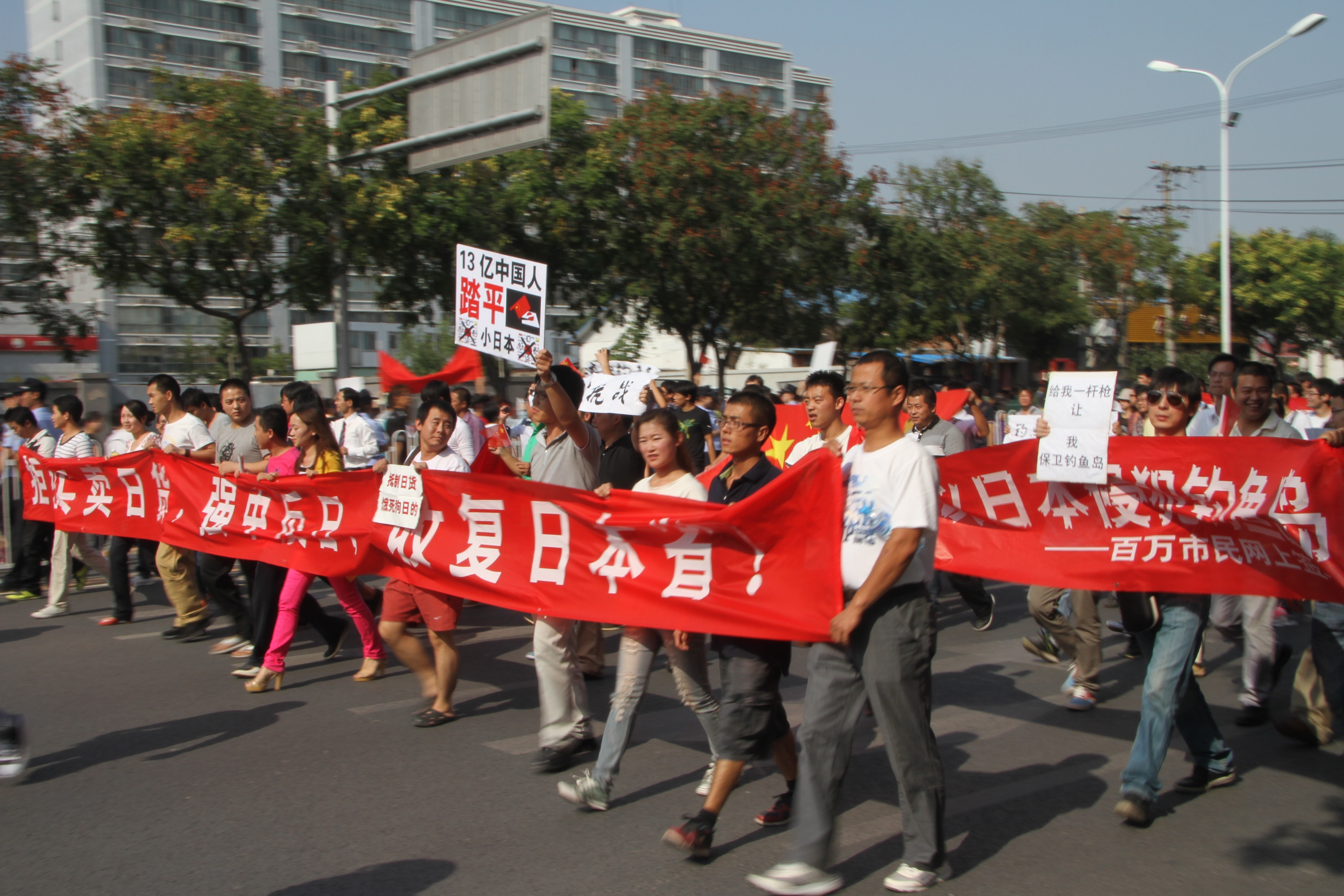
An anti-Japanese march in Beijing in 2012, with a red sheet at the front reading "refuse to buy and sell Japanese goods, make China stronger, oppose Japan and make Japan a province of China again." (拒买卖日货，强中反日，收复日本省)

In 2005, a new wave of boycotts were started in mainland China, concurrent with the anti-Japanese demonstrations in major Chinese cities at the time. However, this boycott was at best a fringe attempt, and was denounced by the mainstream population, citing that China was integrated into the world economy and a boycott of one of China's biggest trading partners would cause as much harm to China as it would to Japan. Most people were more concerned over their standards of living than redressing old grievances. The Chinese Ministry of Foreign Relations gave a similar view: That "Sino-Japanese economic cooperation developed significantly over the past decade and brought real benefits to the people of both nations. We do not wish for economic issues to be politicised."

=== Boycott in South Korea ===
In 2019, a new wave of boycotts were started in South Korea as a response to the 2019–2020 Japan–South Korea trade dispute. People participating in the movement started not buying Japanese products and services, travelling to Japan, and not watching Japanese-made films.

In March, 2019, Gyeonggi Province proposed an ordinance that would require schools to place a sticker on products made by some 284 Japanese companies (such as Nikon, Panasonic, and Yamaha which produce projectors and musical instruments for schools) that says "this product is made by a Japanese war criminal company". Of 27 members who put forward the bill, 25 belonged to the Democratic Party of Korea. It was argued by proponents that the bill was not a boycott, but that it was to give students a correct understanding of history. In Sept 2019, Busan and Seoul Metropolitan Council successfully passed a non-binding ordinances to label products from the same list of companies. In Seoul, this would apply to new products, while the Busan law applies to products that were already purchased.

== See also ==
- Do not buy Russian goods!
- Boycott Chinese products
- Great American Boycott
- Japan–South Korea trade dispute
