= Viktoria Siumar =

Ukrainian journalist and politician

- Вікторія Сюмар
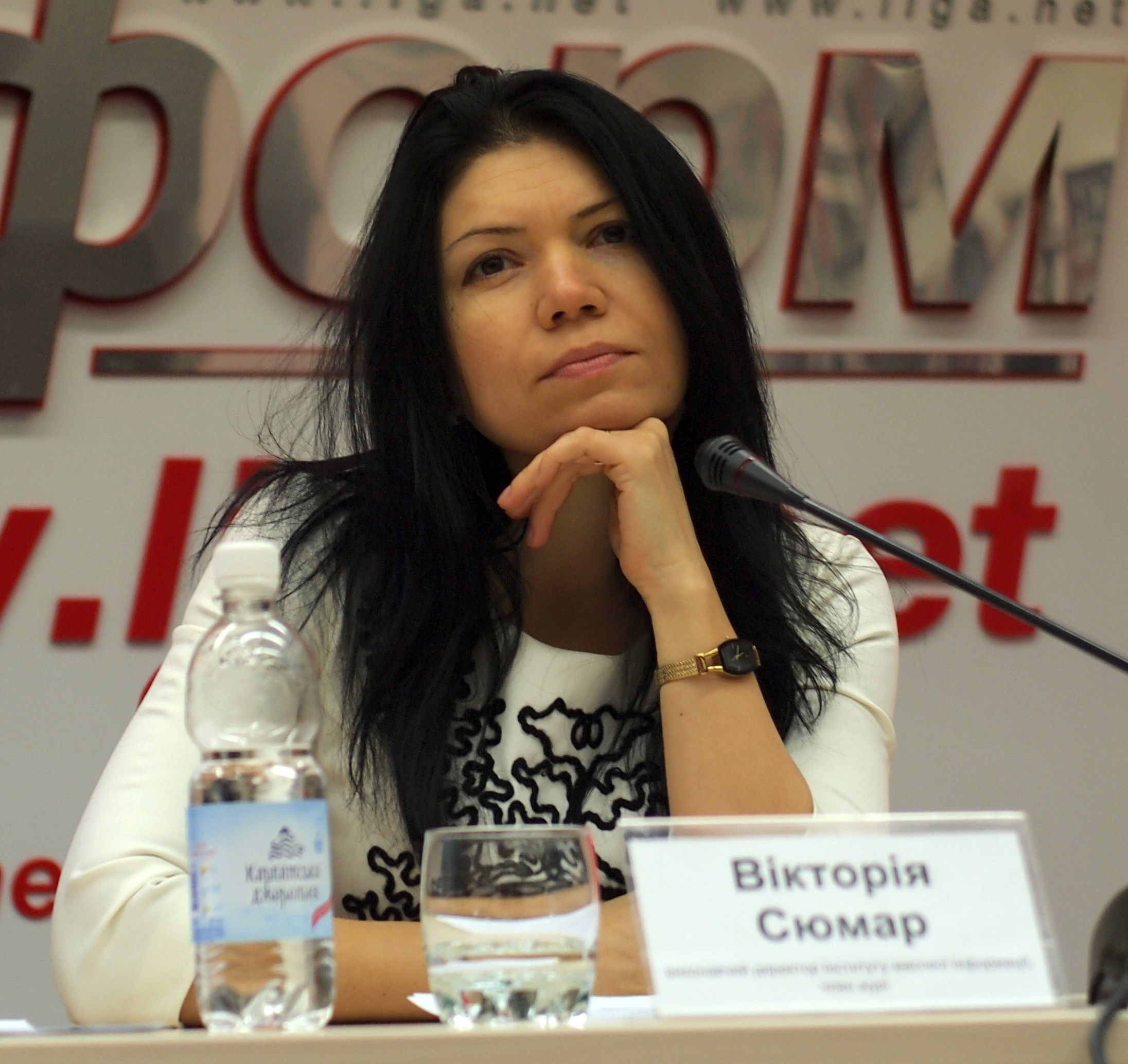
- Siumar in March 2012

People's Deputy of Ukraine
- Incumbent
- Assumed office 27 November 2014

Personal details
- Born: 23 October 1977 (age 48) Nikopol, Dnipropetrovsk Oblast, Ukrainian SSR, Soviet Union
- Party: not a full member of any party
- Other political affiliations: member of People's Front parliamentary faction
- Education: Taras Shevchenko National University of Kyiv, Historical faculty; NASU Institute of History of Ukraine

Viktoria Petrivna Siumar (Ukrainian: Вікто́рія Петрі́вна Сю́мар, born 23 October 1977) is a Ukrainian journalist and politician.

== Biography ==
Siumar formerly worked as an anchor for Hromadske Radio, as a freelance journalist for Voice of America in Ukraine, and as a lecturer at the Taras Shevchenko National University Institute of Journalism. From March to June 2014, she served as the Deputy Secretary of the National Security and Defence Council. In June 2014, Siumar was a member and potential party leader of (the party) Volia. Representing People's Front, she was elected to the Ukrainian parliament in the October 2014 Ukrainian parliamentary election. Since December 2014, she has been heading the Committee on Freedom of Speech and Information Policy.

In the July 2019 Ukrainian parliamentary election Siumar was placed sixteenth of the party list of European Solidarity. She was elected to parliament.

The information referred to in the declaration of assets, revenues, expenditures and financial liabilities is shown on the official website of the Verkhovna Rada of Ukraine : http://gapp.rada.gov.ua/declview/home/preview/17948
