= Boycotts of Chinese products =

Campaigns that advocates a boycott of products sourced from China

There have been campaigns advocating for a boycott of products made in China. Commonly cited reasons for boycotting China include the alleged low quality of products, human rights issues, territorial conflicts involving China, support for separatist movements within China, and objection to more specific matters relating to China, including the government's mismanagement of the COVID-19 pandemic.

There have been calls for a boycott of goods made in China in countries such as India, the Philippines, and Vietnam, as well as separatist movements in China itself. A full boycott of products made in China is considered to be difficult to achieve, as the country manufactures a large number of goods that are widely sold and used across the world, and also holds stakes in various non-Chinese companies.

== Causes ==
China is the second largest country in the world by population, and the third largest by territory, sharing long borders with 14 other nations. Border conflicts and disputes have occurred many times between China and their neighbours during its history.

In 1949, the Chinese Communist Party (CCP) won the Chinese Civil War, gaining control of mainland China. Since the 1980s, with the "reform and opening up", Chinese leaders have made economic development one of their first priorities. Chinese businesses often produce goods tailored to market expectations; therefore, Chinese products generally may lack quality when consumers prefer to pay a low price.

Many companies and businesses also lack capital, industry expertise, and marketing power, leading to their manufacturing of counterfeit products. Many companies produce such goods to piggyback on the popularity of legitimate companies such as Apple, Hyatt and Starbucks are copied. However, by looking at the situation in the context of history, it is often argued that this is simply a normal transition in manufacturing, and that a phase of low quality and counterfeit manufacturing is not unique to China alone, as Japan, South Korea, and Taiwan have undergone very similar economic phases. Keeping the aforementioned information in mind, with high quality goods being delivered from Chinese firms such as Huawei and Lenovo in recent years, it can be observed that the state of Chinese manufacturing quality is ostensibly trending upward in limited sectors.

The 2008 Chinese milk scandal was considered a signal of poor food safety, affecting thousands of people, and as a result, many Chinese parents do not trust Chinese milk products. In recent years, however, the Chinese government has taken many actions in order to prevent sales of substandard food.

Technology produced by Chinese companies has also been a subject of scrutiny, especially by the United States; for example, in 2018, Donald Trump, the President of the United States, signed the National Defense Authorization Act for Fiscal Year 2019 into law, containing a provision that banned Huawei and ZTE equipment from being used by the U.S. federal government, citing security concerns.

Some organisations have used the COVID-19 pandemic as part of campaigns against China; for example, the Vishva Hindu Parishad in India has called for a boycott of China in retaliation for China's allegedly being directly responsible for the severe acute respiratory syndrome coronavirus 2 virus strain and the subsequent COVID-19 pandemic.

== Boycott by country ==
=== Australia ===
Amid escalating trade tensions between Australia and China during the COVID-19 pandemic, a survey conducted by YouGov reported that 88% of Australians support relying less on Chinese imports and produce more essential products locally. In December 2020, politician Pauline Hanson called for a boycott of Chinese products and stated that China was putting its "tentacles around the world". There were calls to boycott 41 vineyards in Australia that were owned by Chinese companies, as well as Australian companies in which Chinese held stakes. These calls reportedly "triggered online abuse" against employees of such companies, and resulted in orders and bookings getting canceled.

In 2019, Australian companies Target and Cotton On Group stopped importing cotton sourced from the Chinese province of Xinjiang after reports of human rights abuse in forced labor camps came to light.

=== India ===
India and the Parliament of the Central Tibetan Administration have called for a joint campaign to boycott Chinese goods in response to border intrusion incidents perpetrated by China. Rashtriya Swayamsevak Sangh sarsanghchalak (chief) Mohan Bhagwat stated "We speak about self-dependence and standing up to China. The new government seems to be standing up to it. But where will the government draw strength from if we don't stop buying things from China?"

In 2016, China blocked the entry of India to the NSG. Besides this, China is viewed as a major roadblock by Indians towards its permanent seat in the UNSC, with China having used its veto power repeatedly to keep India out of the UNSC's permanent seats while the US, UK, France and Russia support India's entry. Meanwhile, China has large amount of investments in Pakistan and provides support for Pakistan in many international organizations, although countries including India and the USA allege Pakistan is a state sponsor of terrorism. During the conflict between the India and Pakistan in August–September 2016 after the Uri attack, Chinese support towards Pakistan led to a campaign to boycott Chinese products in India. As a consequence, sales of Chinese products dipped by about 40 percent in the period immediately after the boycott call.

In May 2020, in response to the 2020 China–India skirmishes, Indian engineer, educator and innovator Sonam Wangchuk appealed to Indians to "use your wallet power" and boycott Chinese products. He called for India to "stop using Chinese software in a week and hardware in a year". This appeal was covered by major media houses and supported by various celebrities. Soon after, the Indian government banned 59 apps that were linked to China "to counter the threat posed by these applications to the country's sovereignty and security", including TikTok, WeChat, Helo and UC Browser. Less than a month later, the Ministry of Electronics and Information Technology of the Government of India banned 47 more Chinese-origin apps and started investigating 250 more for user privacy violations. The Board of Control for Cricket in India suspended the Indian Premier League title sponsorship deal with Chinese smartphone manufacturer Vivo for one year, after India's border standoff with China.

In spite of various campaigns by notable individuals and organisations, many Chinese companies still have influence over various markets, especially relating to consumer technology and software. For example, as in June 2020, Xiaomi, Oppo, Realme, OnePlus and Vivo accounted for approximately 2 in 3 smartphone sales in India. On the other hand, Samsung and Nokia, both companies that once led the market, together accounted for about a third of smartphone sales. In spite of the campaigns, retailers have stated that the growing rhetoric is unlikely to sway consumer behaviour, especially due to alleged "value for money" in Chinese products, especially smartphones.

Chinese companies also hold minority stakes in several Indian tech companies; 18 out of 30 of India's billion-dollar startups in 2020 had raised funds from Chinese investors. Major Chinese investment firms like Alibaba Group and Tencent hold minority stakes in Indian startup companies like Byju's, Zomato, Ola Cabs and Flipkart. In spite of the Indian government recording the origin of foreign direct investment, many Chinese companies exploit loopholes by routing the investments through their non-Chinese subsidiaries; for example, Alibaba's investment in Paytm was by Alibaba Singapore Holdings Pvt. Ltd. Hence, these investments don't get recorded in India's government data as Chinese investments.

In view of these circumstances, various other issues have been pointed out. For example, B Thiagrajan, managing director of Blue Star Limited, an Indian manufacturer of air conditioners, air purifiers and water coolers said "We are not worried about finished goods. But most players across the globe import key components such as compressors from China," and added that it would take a long time to set up local supply chains, and that there were few alternatives for certain kinds of imports. Besides, boycotting popular Chinese apps such as TikTok has been suggested as a more effective alternative to boycotting physical goods in terms of value added because there are multiple alternatives.

The Confederation of All India Traders (CAIT), a Rashtriya Swayamsevak Sangh associated traders' organisation, declared in June 2020 that it will boycott 450 broad categories of commodities, which include 3,000 Chinese products.

=== Philippines ===
Many nationwide campaigns were held by different groups to boycott Chinese products. Albay Gov. Joey Salceda supported Filipinos to boycott Chinese products over the Spratly Islands dispute which was the Scarborough Shoal standoff in 2012.

=== United Kingdom ===
In May 2020, leader of the Brexit Party, Nigel Farage declared that it was "Time to stop buying all Chinese goods" and claimed that the Chinese "intend to be a bullying master of countries that have become too dependent on them." A group of lawyers and activists submitted a 60-page document urging the UK government to ban the import of all cotton from Xinjiang over concerns of "forced labour regime" in the province. A MailOnline survey conducted in June 2020 revealed that 49% of British citizens would boycott "at least some Chinese products", while two-thirds voted in favour of increasing tariffs on Chinese imports.

=== Italy ===
On 10 May 2021, after a reportage from an investigative program called "Report" on RAI 3, there was a boycott of Chinese-made products. The report claimed that thousands of Chinese-made surveillance cameras from the company Hikvision were installed in hundreds of prosecutor buildings, ministries and companies all over the country, raising concerns about Hikvision's connection with the PLA (the Chinese army). The cameras were able to talk to each other, save data and send data overseas to China when a connection was available, after further investigations the cameras were found in major airports. Dislike for China has been rising in Italy in 2021.

=== United States ===
In the United States, charges related to human rights violations (including forced labor camps), unequal treatment of women, conflicts with Hong Kong and Taiwan, and persecution of the religious in China have sparked calls for economic boycotts of the country over the years.

In 2019, the Federal Communications Commission placed China-based telecommunication equipment companies Huawei and ZTE on blacklist citing national security risks. Chinese state-owned network provider China Mobile was banned from operating in the US in 2019 while a license removal was proposed for China Telecom in 2020 due to similar concerns.

According to a survey conducted in Washington in May 2020, 40% of respondents stated that they would not buy products made in China. On an interview during the COVID-19 pandemic, Florida senator Rick Scott claimed that "the American public is going to stop doing business with China" and that they "are now totally fed up with China", accusing China of having "clearly killed Americans with their actions", referring to China's handling of the pandemic. He also said, "No one should ever buy anything from Chinese communist. We should never forget it is communist China, run by the General Secretary of the Chinese Communist Party Xi."

=== Vietnam ===
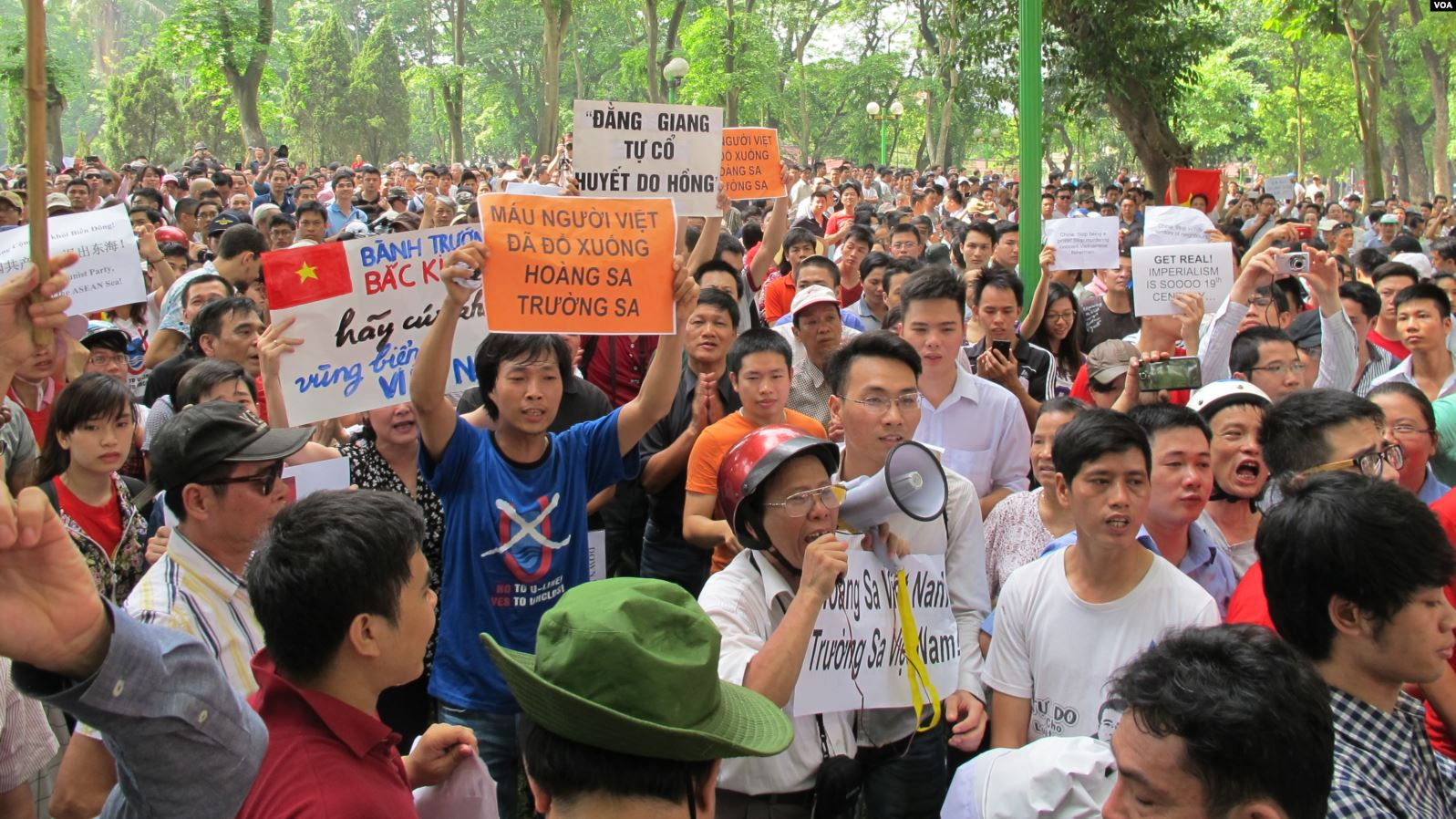
Anti-China protests in Hanoi over the Haiyang Shiyou 981 standoff.

In 2011–12, when China was increasingly aggressive in the South China Sea, many calls appeared on the Internet to boycott Chinese products. According to a reporter of Radio Free Asia, there are two main reasons that Vietnamese used to boycott Chinese products: low quality and the assertive actions of China in the disputed areas in the South China Sea. However, the public was less attentive to these calls while the Vietnamese government seemed not to want this problem might affect their relationship with China.

In 2014, when the tensions about the disputed areas in the South China Sea with China once again happened, especially the case of the Haiyang Shiyou 981 standoff, have triggered some boycott movements in this country. The usage of Made-in-Vietnam goods is an incentive method to show the patriotism over South China Sea conflicts. Vietnamese people have called for a boycott alleging low quality and lack of safety in Chinese products. An advertising campaign was used to promote patriotism with the slogan: "Vietnamese People Give Priority to Vietnamese Goods" (Vietnamese: Người Việt Nam ưu tiên dùng hàng Việt Nam).

=== Tibetan Government-in-exile ===
In 2014, Professor Thubten Jigme Norbu, brother of the 14th Dalai Lama, had called for a campaign to boycott Chinese products for seeking Tibet independence. He said: "I am confident that the campaign to boycott Made-in-China products will gain the support of freedom loving people around the world, and will eventually succeed in forcing China to respect the rights of its own people and acknowledge Tibetan independence. ... I call on all Tibetans and friends to join with us in the pure and sacred struggle to free our country."

In 2020, exiled members of the Tibetan Youth Congress (TYC) organized a movement to boycott Chinese products in McLeodganj, Dharamsala to promote awareness about the expansionist policies of China.

== See also ==
- Boycott, Divestment and Sanctions
- Chinese boycotts of Japanese products
- Do not buy Russian goods!
- Environmental tariff
- Great American Boycott
- Industrial pollution in China
