= 2005–2006 Russia–Ukraine gas dispute =

Natural gas pipelines from Russia to Europe

The 2005–06 Russia–Ukraine gas dispute was between Ukrainian state-controlled oil and gas company Naftogaz Ukrainy and Russian national gas supplier Gazprom. The disagreements concerned natural gas supplies, prices and debts. The conflict started in March 2005, ended in January 2006 and, in addition to the gas companies, involved politicians from both countries.

The conflict began when Russia claimed that Ukraine was not paying for gas and was diverting gas bound from Russia to the European Union from pipelines that crossed the country. Ukrainian officials at first denied the last accusation, but later Naftogaz admitted it used some gas intended for other European countries for domestic needs. The dispute peaked on January 1, 2006 when Russia cut off supply. The cutoff affected gas supplies to European countries that depended on Russian natural gas. On January 4, 2006 a preliminary agreement between Ukraine and Russia was achieved, the supply was restored and the situation calmed.

== Historical background ==
After the collapse of the Soviet Union, Russia began charging market prices to Ukraine for oil in 1993, but both Ukrainian gas import prices and transit fees for Russian exports to Europe were set in bilateral negotiations, well below European levels.

In 2004–2005, about 80% of Russian gas exports to the European Union passed through Ukraine. Two-thirds of Gazprom's revenue comes from the sale of gas that crosses Ukraine.

Ukraine's own gas consumption in 2005 was around 80 billion cubic metres (2.8 trillion cubic feet), of which around 20 billion cubic metres (710 billion cubic feet) were produced domestically, 36 billion cubic metres (1.3 trillion cubic feet) were bought from Turkmenistan, and 17 billion cubic metres (600 billion cubic feet) came from Russia as payment for Russian gas transit. It purchased the remaining 8 billion cubic metres (280 billion cubic feet) from Russia. Relatively cheap Russian gas, sold to Ukraine at $50 per cubic meter between 1998 and 2005, supported growth of energy-intensive industries in Ukraine, its status as one of the world's least energy-efficient countries and largest gas importers, expansion of Ukrainian debts. Eventually, Ukraine failed to pay its debts, diverted gas from the transit system; and came under Russian pressure to relinquish infrastructure in return for debt relief.

Gas trading was conducted under bilateral intergovernmental agreements providing a framework for sales, transit volumes and prices and sometimes other issues such as storage and establishment of joint production ventures. The relevant companies signed contracts in accord with the agreements, supplemented by annual refinements specifying exact prices and volumes for the following year. Gas prices and transit tariffs were set in relationship to each other. Commercial agreements and trade relations have been non-transparent. Trade was conducted by Itera, EuralTransGaz, and since 2004 by RosUkrEnergo, a company with no assets, no track record, and no transparency about its owners. RosUkrEnergo beneficiaries include well-placed officials in Russian and Ukrainian gas industries and governmental structures. RosUkrEnergo is allegedly half-owned by a business ally of Ukraine's President Viktor Yushchenko. The Ukrainian investigation into RosUkrEnergo, during Yulia Tymoshenko's previous term as prime minister, was closed after Yushchenko fired her in September 2005.

According to the contract between Gazprom and Naftogaz signed on June 21, 2002, payment was in the form of barter—up to 15% of gas pumped through the Ukrainian territory was taken by Ukraine instead of cash. This contract was supposed to be valid until the end of 2013. On August 9, 2004, the two companies signed a contract addendum setting the transit tariff at US$1.09 per 1,000 cubic meters per 100 kilometres (62 mi). This tariff was the basis for computing the amount of gas delivered in lieu of cash. The amendment fixed the gas price at $50 per 1,000 cubic meters (approximately $1.40 per million Btu), independent of European market prices. According to the addendum the price was not subject to change until the end of 2009. In 2005, Gazprom argued that this addendum was only applicable provided that the two countries sign an annual intergovernmental protocol having higher legal status for specifying the terms of gas transit. According to Gazprom, the addendum was void because the annual protocol had not been signed for 2006 under the required terms. Russia claimed that Gazprom's subsidies to the Ukrainian economy amounted to billions of dollars.

== 2005 negotiations ==
In March, Gazprom informed Ukraine that it was raising prices to market levels, charging $160 per 1,000 cubic meters (approximately $4.40 per million Btu). Ukraine's new government agreed to pay the higher prices in return for increased transit fees. Ukraine took steps to change the payments for the transition of Gazprom's gas to Europe from barter to cash. Yushchenko agreed to pay higher prices only over time, stating that Ukrainian industry would become unprofitable with gas above $90.

7.8 billion cubic metres (280 billion cubic feet) of natural gas which Gazprom had deposited in Ukrainian storage reservoirs during the previous winter had disappeared. It remained unclear if the gas had leaked away, had been stolen, or if there was another cause. In July by agreement, Gazprom, Naftogaz and RosUkrEnergo reached a preliminary agreement. Naftogaz received 2.55 billion cubic metres (90 billion cubic feet) of natural gas as partial settlement of 2005 transit services and 5.25 billion cubic metres (185 billion cubic feet) was sold by Gazprom to RosUkrEnergo who was to receive it from Naftogaz.

During the final three months of 2005, negotiations between Gazprom and Naftogaz stalled. Gazprom demanded a 2006 price of $160–230 per 1,000 cubic meters unless a Gazprom/Naftogaz consortium took over transmission. Ukraine agreed presuming it was phased in and that the maximum it was prepared to pay in 2006 was $80 per 1,000 cubic meters.

In November, Ukraine proposed to pay for gas with weapon supplies as one option. Some Ukrainian officials called for a review of the lease price Russia paid to Ukraine for keeping its Black Sea Fleet in Sevastopol, Crimea, while Russia resisted any discussions that might affect the lease.

On December 8, Russian President Vladimir Putin noted that Ukrainian consumers pay less for gas than do Russians. He claimed that Ukraine had enough money to pay market price. Putin also noted that Russia subsidized Ukraine by $1 billion a year from the Russian budget—money that Gazprom would have paid from its revenues. He also noted that 25 million Russians live below the poverty line, further questioning Ukraine's deal.

On December 13, Gazprom stated that unless an agreement were reached before January 1, 2006, it would cut Ukraine off. Gazprom also stated its readiness to create a joint venture to own and operate Ukraine's gas transit pipelines. After Ukraine rejected this proposal, Gazprom stated that the new price would have to be 220–230 per 1,000 cubic meters (~ $6.35/million Btu), claiming that this was the market price. Ukraine then requested international arbitration.

On December 15, Ukraine offered a joint-venture for selling gas in the internal Ukrainian market in exchange for gradual price increases up to 2010. Gazprom declined. On December 26, Prime Minister Yuriy Yekhanurov asserted that Ukraine had a contractual right for 15% of the gas transiting to the European Union. This statement came largely in response to the Gazprom threat to resort to the Arbitration Institute of the Stockholm Chamber of Commerce should Ukraine engage in unlawful withdrawal of Russian transit gas. Earlier, Yekhanurov announced that Ukraine could refer the case to the Institute if the compromise was not reached. On December 29, Putin offered Ukraine a $3.6 billion loan to cover the increase in gas prices. Yushchenko rejected the offer. In the last days of 2005, European countries, which had stayed out of the dispute, began advocating for a compromise. On December 31 Putin offered to postpone the price increase until April 2006 if Ukraine immediately agreed to the new prices. Ukraine did not agree.

Andrei Illarionov, then Putin's economic adviser, resigned rather than explain the price hike and other issues of Russia–Ukraine relations as liberal economic policies.

== Cut-off ==
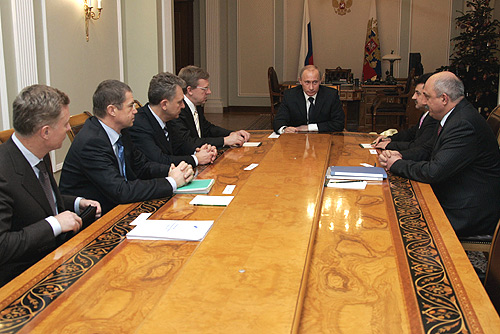
Then President of Russia Vladimir Putin at a meeting on 29 December 2005 with Alexei Kudrin (Russian Finance Minister), Viktor Khristenko (Russian Energy Minister), Alexander Medvedev (Deputy Chairman of the Gazprom board), Ivan Plachkov (Ukrainian Energy Minister) and Alexey Ivchenko (CEO of Naftogaz), in which the dispute was discussed

On January 1, 2006 Gazprom started reducing pressure in the pipeline system ahead of the deadline of the Russian ultimatum set for 10:00 MSK. At the same time Russia accused Ukraine of stealing $25 million worth of gas. Ukraine denied the allegation. On January 24, Naftogaz admitted withholding some Russian gas intended for other European countries in January 2006, but said it would still meet its contractual obligations. A spokesman for Naftogaz said the gas was needed to cope with especially cold weather.

European gas imports were declining, whether from Ukrainian expropriation or Russian undersupply. Gazprom invited the Switzerland-based goods inspection and testing company SGS to monitor the amount of gas that is entering Ukraine's pipeline network.

The EU's contract with Gazprom requires the supplier to deliver to the former USSR's border, i.e., Ukraine's western border. Therefore, if Ukraine interferes with delivery, the EU can sue Gazprom for contract violations. As soon as the supply began to fall in the EU, Gazprom was forced to return supplies to normal.

== Impact on Europe ==
Many European countries saw a drop in the supply of gas:

- Austria—Russian supplies down by around 33%
- Bosnia and Herzegovina—100 %
- Croatia—100 %
- France—25–30 %
- Germany—supplies down by an unspecified amount
- Hungary—40 %
- Italy—24 % (6% of total imports)
- (North Macedonia) Republic of Macedonia—supplies down by around 100%
- Poland—14 %
- Romania—20 %
- Serbia—100 %
- Slovakia—33 %
- Slovenia—33 % (40% of average annual gas supply).

== Agreement to end the dispute ==
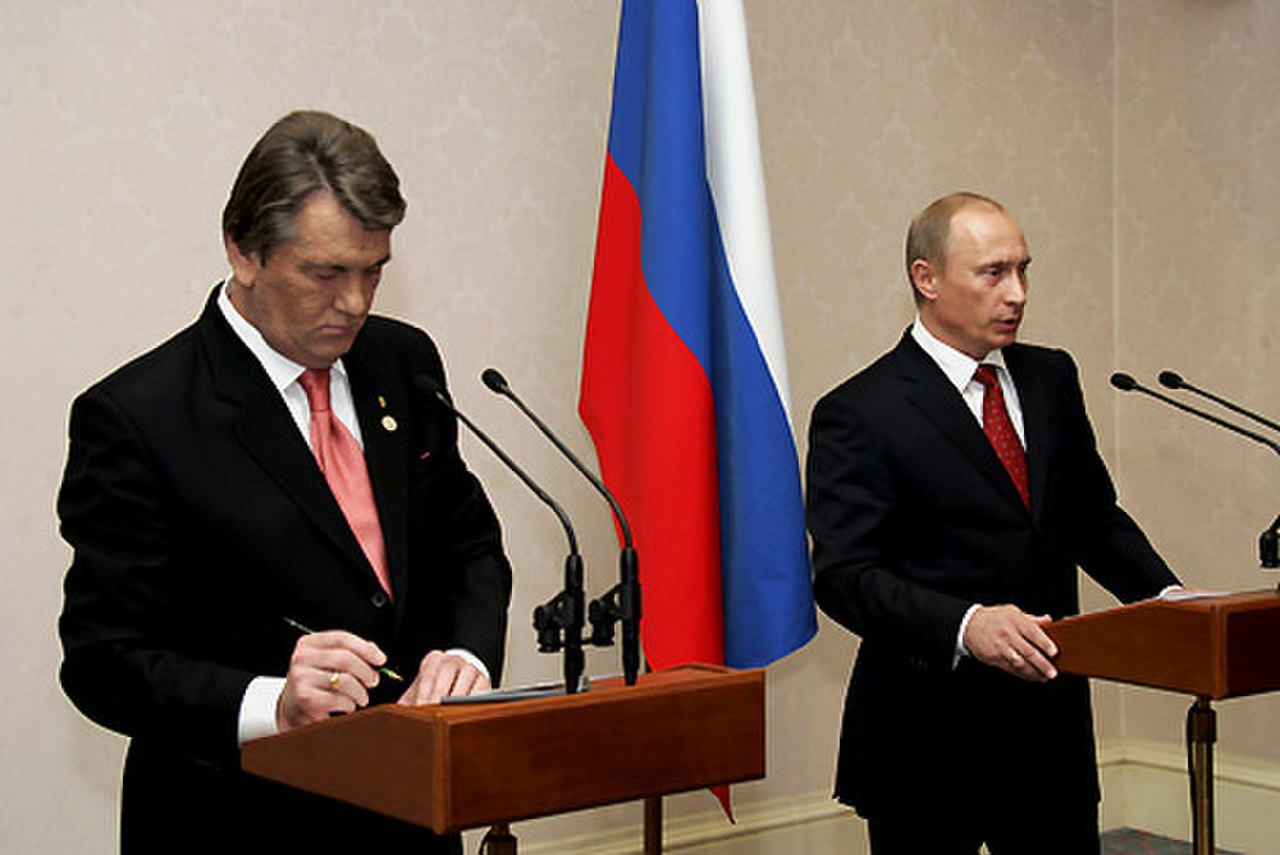
Then President of Russia Vladimir Putin and President of Ukraine Viktor Yushchenko hold a joint press conference in Astana on 11 January 2006

On January 4, Russia and Ukraine ended the dispute. A five-year contract was signed, although with prices set for six months only. According to the contract, the gas was sold not directly to Naftogaz, but to RosUkrEnergo, who paid $230 per 1,000 cubic metres. After mixing it with two thirds of cheaper supplies from Central Asia RosUkrEnergo resold it to Ukraine at a price of $95 per 1,000 cubic metres. The parties also agreed to raise the transit tariff from US$1.09 to US$1.60 per 1,000 cubic meters per 100 km. This price also held for transit of Turkmen gas through Russia to Ukraine.

The company had to buy 16 billion cubic metres (570 billion cubic feet) from Russia at $230 per 1000 cubic meters, 40 billion cubic metres (1.4 trillion cubic feet) from Turkmenistan and Kazakhstan at price of $60–65 per 1000 cubic meters, and then sell it to Ukraine at US$95 per 1000 cubic meters. Besides, RosUkrEnergo had to transport 40 billion cubic metres (1.4 trillion cubic feet) from Turkmenistan to Ukraine at price US$1.60 per 1000 cubic meters per 100 km, or $1,920 million. Total expenses become US$2,500 +US$3,800 + US$1,920 million, or US$8.2 billion. Revenues from selling the gas are just $5.5 billion.

== International reactions ==
According to the Russian news agency ITAR-TASS, economic ministers of Germany, Italy, Austria and France warned Ukraine that their nations' relations with Ukraine could be affected if it failed to deliver gas according to the contract schedule. On January 3 Russian Prime Minister Mikhail Fradkov asked the European Union to influence Ukraine to ensure gas transit from Russia to EU countries.

On January 3 and 4 Austrian Minister of Foreign Affairs Ursula Plassnik supported resumption of gas supplies by Gazprom and emphasized that a lasting solution was preferable to unilateral measures.

According to Pascal Lamy of the World Trade Organization, all Post-Soviet states that buy gas from Gazprom should pay market prices to improve the efficiency of their economies. Illarionov noted there is no such thing as a market price for gas, because Russia offers different terms for analogous countries, e.g. gas price for Ukraine is not calculated in the same way as for Germany.

== Alleged political motivation ==
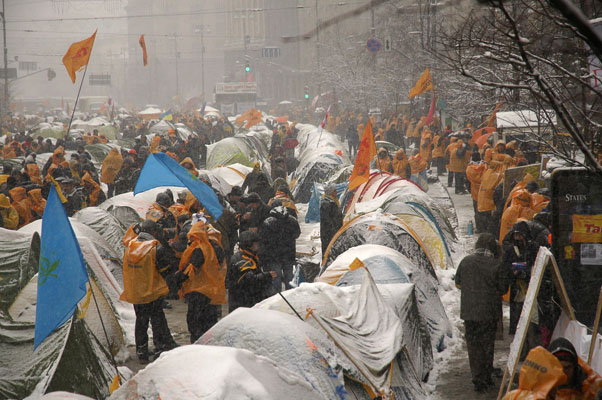
Tents in Kyiv during Ukraine's 2004 Orange Revolution

European and U.S. media cited sources who saw the conflict as punishing the new 'orange' Government of Ukraine, which was considered more pro-NATO and EU than its predecessor, despite the fact that the country paid less than (fellow post-Soviet state) Georgia and other European countries. Russian officials state that the country can no longer subsidize former Soviet republics. However, when the 'orange' Government of Ukraine was ousted later in 2006 and replaced by a new more Moscow-friendly Government led by Viktor Yanukovych, the price for 2007 still grew to $135 per 1,000 cubic meters (from $95 in 2006).

Earlier in 2005 Gazprom declined Turkmenistan's offer to buy natural gas at $58 per 1,000 cubic meters as too expensive, but in December 2005 it agreed to buy additional 30 billion cubic metres (1.1 trillion cubic feet) of gas at $65. Oil and gas prices doubled during 2005.

== Public reaction ==
Political pressure Russia to Ukraine during the gas conflict led to the emergence of a public campaign to boycott Russian goods in Ukraine. In December 2005, unknown activists in Kirovohrad distributed leaflets calling not to buy Russian goods. Then various social and political movements in Ukraine picked up the idea, which got wide publicity and support.

== See also ==
- 2009 Russia–Ukraine gas dispute
- Natural gas in Ukraine
