= Rose Rosengard Subotnik =

Rose Rosengard Subotnik (née Rosengard; born 1942) is a leading American musicologist, generally credited with introducing the writing of Theodor Adorno to English-speaking musicologists in the late 1970s.

== Early life ==
Subotnik was born in 1942 to Bruna Hazan (1909–2004) and David E. Rosengard (1910–1988) in Boston. David E. Rosengard was a math teacher who would later become the assistant superintendent of the Boston public schools. Subotnik graduated first in her class from Girls' Latin High School (1959) and then first in her class at Wellesley College (BA 1963). Upon graduation, she entered a PhD program in musicology at Columbia University (MA 1965, PhD 1973), under her advisor Edward Lippman. Her dissertation was on Albert Lortzing and the Social Analysis of German Popular Opera. While at Columbia, she also took classes with Paul Henry Lang, Jacques Barzun, and Lionel Trilling.

== Personal life ==
Rose Subotnik married Dan Subotnik in 1969. Dan Subotnik is a professor of law at Touro Law Center, and has written extensively on tax, race and gender. They have two children.

== Professional life ==
Subotnik began her teaching career as an assistant professor of musicology at the University of Chicago (1973–80). She received fellowships from the American Council of Learned Societies (1977), the John Simon Guggenheim Memorial Foundation (1977). Later, she was a visiting associate professor of music at the Graduate Center, CUNY (1986–7), joining the faculty of Brown University (1990); she was appointed full professor of music in 1993. In 2009, she won the American Musicological Society's Slim award which "recognizes an outstanding musicological article published in the previous year by a scholar beyond the early stages of her or his career" and was made an honorary member of the AMS.

Early in her career, Subotnik's academic interests focused on the German philosopher Theodor Adorno (of the Frankfurt school), as she argued that music could not be dissected and fully analyzed out of context, i.e. without understanding its place in society. In recent years, Subotnik’s interests have turned to Tin Pan Alley and American musical theatre as well as critical theory.

== Books ==
- Developing Variations: Style and Ideology in Western Music (University of Minnesota Press, 1991)
- Deconstructive Variations: Music and Reason in Western Society (University of Minnesota Press, 1995)

== Selected Additional Writings ==
- "Adorno and the New Musicology," in Adorno: A Critical Reader, ed. Nigel Gibson and Andrew Rubin (Blackwell, 2000)
- “Afterword: Towards the Next Paradigm of Musical Scholarship,” in Beyond Structural Listening: Postmodern Modes of Hearing, ed. Andrew Dell’Antonio (University of California Press, 2004)
- "Shoddy Equipment for Living?: Deconstructing the Tin Pan Alley Song," in Musicological Identities: Essays in Honor of Susan McClary, ed. Raymond Knapp, Steven Baur and Jacqueline Warwick (Ashgate, 2008)
- "How Many Ways Can You Idolize a Song?," in Idol Anxiety, ed. Josh Ellenbogen and Aaron Tugendhaft (Stanford University Press, 2011)

== See also ==
- Women in musicology
