= Embassy of Russia, Kyiv =

Diplomatic mission of Russia to Ukraine

Embassy of Russia in Kyiv
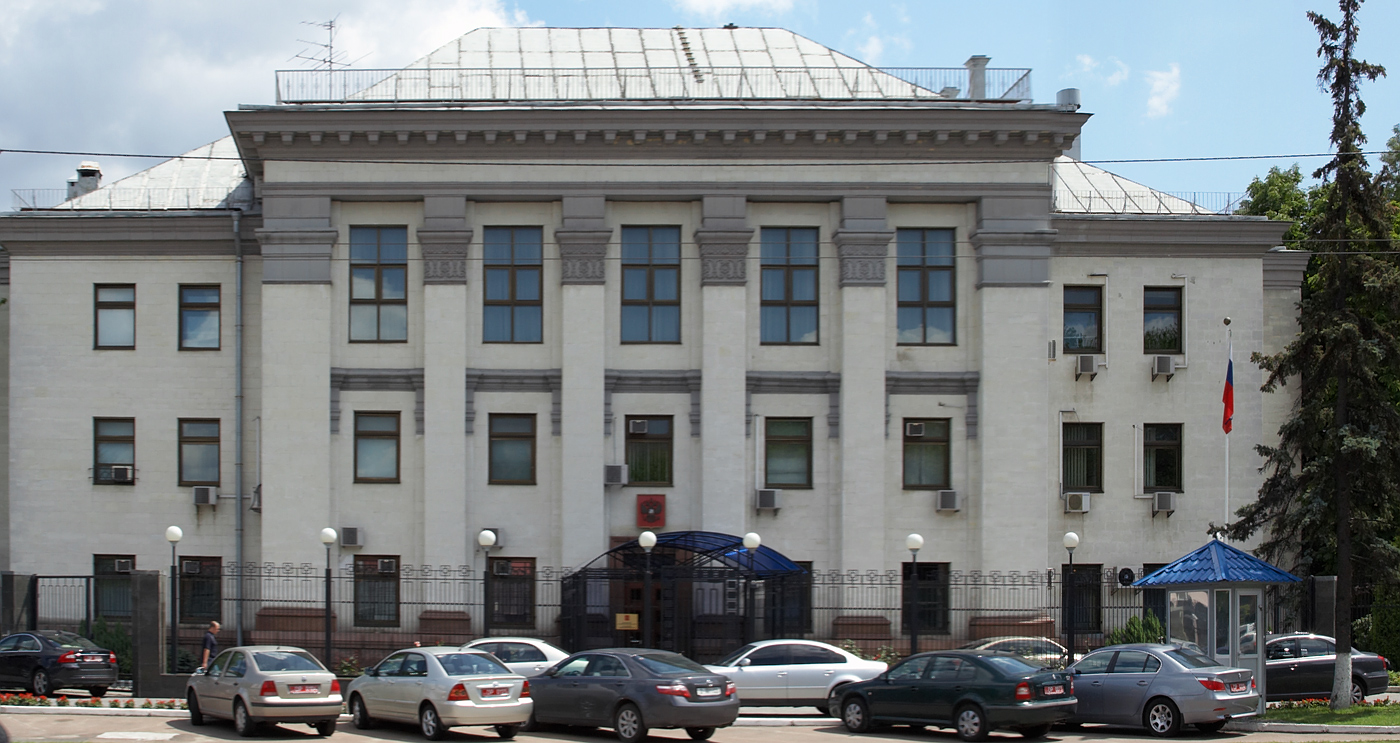
- Location: Kyiv
- Address: 27 Povitroflotskyi Prospekt, 04112 Kyiv, Ukraine
- Coordinates: 50.433601°N 30.471826°E
- Ambassador: Post vacant since 28 July 2016; Relations terminated on 24 February 2022

The Embassy of Russia in Kyiv was the diplomatic mission of Russia to Ukraine. The chancery was located at 27 Povitroflotskyi Prospekt in Ukraine's capital Kyiv.

== History ==
Following the independence of Ukraine on 24 August 1991, Russia recognized Ukraine's independence on 5 December 1991. Diplomatic relations between Ukraine and Russia were established on 14 February 1992 by the signing of the Protocol on the Establishment of Diplomatic Relations between Ukraine and the Russian Federation. On 6 August 1992, Russia opened an embassy in Kyiv.

During early March 2014, demonstrations were held outside the Russian embassy in Kyiv in response to a Russian intervention in Crimea. On 14 June 2014 between 200 and 300 protesters overturned several cars of embassy staff and replaced the Russian flag with the flag of the Ukrainian Insurgent Army in protest against Russian governmental involvement in the 2014 pro-Russian unrest in Ukraine. The protests were followed by "negotiations" (organised by the Security Service of Ukraine) between protesters and the embassy's staff. During these, the protesters demanded that the personnel of the Russian embassy "as a hotbed of anti-Ukrainian activities" should immediately leave Ukraine and that Russia should recognize that it was waging an undeclared war against Ukraine.

On 5 January 2022, 18 people — mostly the children and wives of Russian diplomats — boarded buses for a 15-hour journey to Russia, according to a Ukrainian security official. Around 30 more left in the next few days, from Kyiv and a consulate in Lviv, in western Ukraine.

On 23 February 2022, the embassy was evacuated for what were described as safety reasons. The day after, Russia launched its invasion of Ukraine, prompting Ukraine to sever all formal diplomatic relations with Russia.

On 20 April 2023, the Kyiv City Council terminated the Russian lease contract of the building. Kyiv Mayor Vitali Klitschko appealed to the Ukrainian government to return the leased property to the state.

== Previous ambassadors ==
1. Leonid Smolyakov (1991–1996)
2. Yuri Dubinin (1996–1999)
3. Ivan Aboimov (1999–2001)
4. Viktor Chernomyrdin (2001–2009)
5. Vsevolod Loskutov (2009), Chargé d'Affaires ad interim
6. Mikhail Zurabov (2009–2016)
7. Sergey L. Toropov (2016), Chargé d'Affaires ad interim
8. Aleksandr Lukashyk (2016–2022), Chargé d'Affaires ad interim
9. Vladimir Zheglov (2022), Chargé d'Affaires ad interim

== See also ==
- Russia–Ukraine relations
- Diplomatic missions in Ukraine
- Embassy of Ukraine, Moscow
