= Chainik =

Term

Chainik (East Slavic: чайник, "teakettle", "teapot") is a term that implies both ignorance and a certain amount of willingness to learn (as well as a propensity to cause disaster), but does not necessarily imply as little experience or short exposure time as newbie and is not as derogatory as luser. Both a novice user and someone using a computer system for a long time without any understanding of the internals can be referred to as chainiks.

It is a widespread term in Russian hackish, often used in an English context by Russian-speaking hackers especially in Israel (e.g. "Our new colleague is a complete chainik"). FidoNet discussion groups often had a "chainik" subsection for newbies and old chainiks (e.g. SU.CHAINIK, RU.LINUX.CHAINIK). Public projects often have a chainik mailing list to keep the chainiks out the developers' and experienced users' discussions. Today, the word is slowly slipping into mainstream Russian due to the Russian translation of the popular For Dummies series which uses "chainik" for "dummy".

Term can also apply to novice mountaineers, backpackers, drivers, etc., with such usage predating the usage in computing context.

Some suggest the term is derived from a Russian folk custom to make a gift of a hollow thing – e.g., a pitted pumpkin, a kettle, or a teapot – to unsuccessful matchmakers of an aspiring groom rejected by a bride. The unlucky groom was mockingly called chainik. Over time the term entered other usages for unlucky, inept, or newbie people.
