= Against degradation of education =

Civil campaign "Against degradation of education" Ukrainian: Громадянська кампанія "Проти деградації освіти" Russian: Гражданская кампания "Против деградации образования"
- Date: 2010-2013
- Location: Ukraine, mainly Kyiv
- Caused by: registration of draft laws #7486-1, 9655, 1187 and 2060a in Verkhovna Rada and attempts to adopt them
- Goals: prevent adoption of draft laws #7486-1, 9655, 1187 and 2060a
- Methods: protests, strikes, press conferences
- Result: 2010-2013: all efforts of government to adopt these laws ended in failure; 2014: adoption of law #1187-2 which was developed by civil activists

Parties
Government authorities: Ministry of Education and Science of Ukraine; Cabinet of Ministers of Ukraine; Political parties: Party of Regions; Communist Party of Ukraine; Also: titushky	Civil organizations: Vidsich; Direct Action; Foundation of Regional Initiatives; Ukrainian Association of Student Self-government; other; Also: students; citizens

Lead figures
Dmytro Tabachnyk (Minister of Education); Yevgen Sulima (deputy Minister of Education); Mykola Azarov (Prime Minister); Oleksandr Yefremov (leader of Party of Regions); Maxim Luczky (Chairman of Committee of the Verkhovna Rada on science and education, 2007-2012); Sergiy Kivalov (MP from Party of Regions); Grigoriy Kalietnik (MP from Party of Regions); Mykola Soroka (MP from Party of Regions); Ihor Kalietnik (MP from Communist Party)	

“Against Degradation of Education” was a 2010 to 2013 campaign of the Ukrainian student movements including the social activist group Vidsich and the syndicalist trade union Direct Action to prevent the adoption of President Viktor Yanukovych’s education reform in Ukraine, which was criticised as reducing the civil liberties of students and allowing for endemic corruption to take root. After June 2013, it shifted to a campaign in support of "EIE protection". It was later subsumed into the Euromaidan movement, which installed a new government that passed new education reform supported by the Vidsich in 2014.

== Reasons ==
On November 8, 2010, the Ministry of Education and Science of Ukraine published a new edition of the draft law "On higher education". Concern is growing among students and civil activists because this draft law provides a number of rules, which tends to strengthen corruption in higher education, increase the commercialization of education, restrict student government. In particular, the new draft law, compared to current law #2984-14, allowed to indefinitely increase fees for contract students during the period of study, abolished the guarantee of acceptance to the first course on a free basis for distance learning (part-time), evening and external learning students, abolished the minimum limit of funding for training and ability to combine forms of study, declined funding for free education by 42% and contained many confusing and legally incorrect statements.

== Course of events ==
=== 2010 ===
On November 8, the Ukrainian Ministry of Education and Science (MES) sent copies of the draft law "On higher education" to all of its departments and the head of every university, effectively releasing the bill to the public. The MES stated it would request its passage in the Verkhovna Rada, and explained why it believed the law would improve the education system. Subsequently, on December 22, Oleksandr Yefremov and Maxim Luczky registered the draft law "On higher education" #7486-1 in Verkhovna Rada.

=== 2011 ===
- January 20 - activists of Kyiv-Mohyla Academy hold a press conference against the draft law "On higher education" #7486-1, according to which the status of Kyiv-Mohyla Academy will change from university to college.
- January 31 - protests against draft law "On higher education" #7486-1 took place in many cities of Ukraine, among which were Kyiv, Kharkiv, Odesa, Donetsk, Zaporizhzhia, Zhytomyr and Khmelnytskyi. In Kyiv protests took place near the building of Committees of the Verkhovna Rada. Participants made paper planes of their conspectus and launched them, "armed" with pencils and chanted slogans.
- February 1 - the draft law "On higher education" #7486-1 was included in the agenda of Verkhovna Rada.
- February 10 - activists of the campaign announced their demands in the press center of news agency LIGABusinessInform. They were supported by Igor Likarchuk, ex-director of Ukrainian Center for Educational Quality Assessment. One of the coauthors of the draft law Yuriy Miroshnichenko thanked students for criticisms and promised the participants to consider their positions. Student activists promised to strengthen protests in case of dissatisfaction of their demands.
- February 16 - student activists hold the press conference right on the pavement outside Verkhovna Rada, where the meeting of the committee on education took place. Participants took paintings and drawing made by themselves in their hands and also were doing ordinary students activities - read, took notes, solved tasks. They stated that in case this draft law is adopted they will lose their opportunity to have education. No decisions were approved by the committee this day.
- February 28 - the second all-Ukrainian protest against the draft law was held. Students, teachers, pupils and their parents protested in Kyiv, Donetsk, Khmelnitsky and Simferopol. In Kyiv participants meet near Arsenalna metro station and went to the building of Committees of the Verkhovna Rada, where, through a provocation, there was a clash in which Berkut (special police force) intervened. As it could make an impression of disunity of students, the students from different sides of the police cordon hugged each other to seal their unity. After the end of the protest, provocators followed participants to the Square of Contracts and attacked them and pedestrians near the building of Kyiv-Mohyla Academy. It resulted in creating of expert working group of MES, which included several representatives of students, to make changes to the draft law.
- March 10 - after continuous mass protests the draft law "On higher education" #7486-1 was withdrawn. Immediately after that appeared the information that the new draft law "On education" is being prepared by Dmytro Tabachnyk and MES.
- March 17 - the press conference "MES frames students? Risks of the draft law "On higher education"" took palace in the building of Kyiv-Mohyla Academy, which was organized by "antidegradants". The reason was the new nearly identical to previous draft law. During the work of the expert working group of MES, included several representatives of students, it became clear that the demands of students are not taken into account and ministry officials do not want any dialogue or compromise.
- March 28 - Vidsich starts a serie of actions near local universities in Lviv titled "Higher education - obstacle race". Students were offered to play the game "to go all the way to their higher education, overcoming obstacles made by MES". The goal of actions was to show all negative sides of the draft law "On higher education" and legislative policy of the Ministry. This day actions took place near Ivan Franko University and Lviv Polytechnic University.
- March 30 - the third "Higher education - obstacle race" action took place near Agricultural Academy in Dubliany not far from Lviv.
- March 31 - the fourth "Higher education - obstacle race" action took place near Ukrainian National Forestry University in Lviv.
- April 13 - a protest with 3 to 4 thousand students participating took place near Lviv Regional State Administration during which student announce their demands and claim that "Education protects freedom better than armed troops" (phrase of Edward Everett). Protest started near Ivan Franko University and continued with the walk to Administration. Participants also demanded the resignation of Dmytro Tabachnyk, his deputy Yevhen Sulima and top management of MES.
- May 13 - representatives of students left the working group of MES because all their demands were ignored.
- May 17 - press conference took place near Taras Shevchenko National University of Kyiv. Activists announced that even after talks with students the draft law "On higher education" still contains rules violating the rights of students and teachers and also announced a nationwide strike on May 25.
- May 25 - nationwide strike took place in 20 cities of Ukraine. European Students' Union and "Street University" of Saint Petersburg expressed support to protesters. In Kyiv hired young people (a.k.a. titushky) came to the Presidential Administration of Ukraine in advance to prevent the protest to take place there. Students controlled by MES met to express their support to the draft law "On higher education". Shortly after that Dmytro Tabachnyk announced in a press conference that all demands of students were taken into account, which was not true.
- June 21 - The press conference in the form of theatrical play took place near the Cabinet of Ministers with students and teachers participating. The reason for it was the information that executive authorities were going to adopt the law on June 23 violating the procedure. Students announced that they are ready to continue their protests in September and demanded the resignation of MES top management. Action was also a part of "AntiTabachnik campaign". On the same day, student organizations controlled by MES held their own press conference where they urged support for the draft law.
- September 1 - Vidsich activists held an action called "Tabachnyks reforms are like tits on a goat" in eight cities of Ukraine. Its main idea was to emphasize unfulfilled promises of Minister Dmytro Tabachnyk, his lies and official incompetence, particularly about the draft law "On higher education". In Kyiv students took a self-made barrel to the Presidential Administration which symbolized "empty" promises of the Minister. In Lviv the symbolic memorial to the Minister-goat was established on the Market Square. In Vinnitsa participants jumped over gymnastics buck (in Ukrainian language it is called "gymnastics goat"). In Donetsk participants were showing "ministerial kitchen", which gets "every kind of junk". In Lutsk students showed "construction goat" (scaffolding) which can not hold a thing.
- September 22 - "The Forum of Ministers of Education of European countries "The school of 21st century: Kyiv initiatives" began in Kyiv. In contrast to it activists of Direct Action started their own forum "The other side of education". Demands of protesters were: prevent the introduction of paid services and increasing of education fee, scholarships at the subsistence level, free choice of subjects and anytime access to dormitories, etc., mainly to prevent the adoption of the odious draft law "On higher education", which also was noted during the alternative public event. The court, because of the Forum of Ministers of Education, prohibited all action city center, but Sofiivska square was absent from the list of places where actions are prohibited. Students met on Mikhaylivska square and after a short argument with the bailiff went to the Sofiivska square but a clash with police started on their way. During that, an activist of Direct Action was arrested and put into a police van. After that most of the participants left this place. Several participants went to the van to find out on what basis the arrest was made. A policeman from Berkut (special police force) got out of the van and started pushing people, arrested another activist from Vidsich and put him in the van. At the same time, the second clash with police happened on the crossroads of Volodymyrsky lane and Lesser Zhytomyrska street during which another two activists of Direct Action were arrested. Arrested activists were treated brutally and one of them was beaten. All arrested activists were taken to Shevchenkivsky police precinct #4 where they were released with no charges. Later the spokesman of Kyiv police announced that activists were not arrested but invited for a talk.
- September 23 - the Forum of Ministers of Education and "The other side of education" are still going on. Public actions were not prohibited in this day, but anyway police blocked the way to the European Square for activists. Students started sitting protest right near the police cordon. For obscure reasons some people begin to run away from the cordon and police surrounds activists for the next 2 hours, during which negotiation was held between organizers of actions and commanders of police with MPs participating in this negotiation. It resulted in the police finally letting activists go to the European Square and finish the action. After action activists tried to enter Institutska street where the Forum of Ministers of Education was taking place, but police did not let them do it. After the end of the forum, it became clear that most of the European ministers ignored it.
- October 19 - students held a round table (press conference) "Pseudo referendum of Tabachnyk: another fake from worthless "reformator"" during which activists warned about "referendum" on the draft law "On higher education" organized by student organizations controlled by MES which will take place on October 24. Activists urged to boycott this "referendum" because of its unrepresentativeness, manipulations and lies.
- October 24 - the "referendum" took place in many Ukrainian universities. Apart from this poll can not be called a referendum there were no independent control over the vote count, question in the ballots contained false statements and were manipulatively formed. Due to this activists decided to hold actions near universities where referendum will take place to explain to students the essence of the event and the pro-government draft law "On higher education". In Kyiv near Kyiv National Economic University and Borys Grinchenko Kyiv University a man in Tabachnyk mask offered students to play shell game (symbolically to play with Ukrainian education) and always won. Near both universities, activists were attacked by anonymous people who introduced themselves as "security guards". In Rivne activists of Direct Action and Foundation of Regional Initiatives were holding a protest action near the National University of Water Management and Nature Resources Use. They were strongly counteracted by the pro-rector and police. In Donetsk, the same organizations were giving out "cheat sheets" (leaflets explaining the rules of the draft law mentioned in ballots) near Donetsk National Technical University.
- October 28 - during the Third Ukrainian Congress of Educators, which took place in the National Aviation University in Kyiv, students addressed the delegates asking Congress not to approve MESs education policy. An appeal was published on the Internet and leaflets with it were given to delegates to the congress.
- November 16 - in Kyiv near the main office of Party of Regions activists of Vidsich held an exhibition of "weapons" that they can use against the government if it will allow the adoption of laws that reduce citizen rights, social protection and other. Activists emphasized preventing of adoption of the draft law "On higher education". The petition was given to representatives of the government party.
- November 17 - students made a flashmob. They lined up in a queue to give a written complaint about imitating support of the draft law "On higher education" by students. The argument started between students and the head of the department of higher education Yaroslav Bolyubash. Police did not let students enter MES, so they pinned their complaints to the fence near the MES building.
- December 28 - Cabinet of Ministers registered another draft law "On higher education" #9655 in Verkhovna Rada
- December 30 - Lesya Orobets and Arseniy Yatsenyuk registered an alternative draft law "On higher education" #9655-1 developed by the parliamentary opposition.

=== 2012 ===
- January 6 - Yuriy Miroshnichenko (the representative of the President of Ukraine in Verkhovna Rada) registered another alternative draft law "On higher education" #9655-2.
- January 10 - due to the registration of the draft law "On higher education" #9655 students, despite holidays, met near the building of Committees of the Verkhovna Rada to prevent inclusion of this draft law to the agenda of Verkhovna Rada. Students held a theatrical play in which Did Moroz (Ukrainian analogue of Santa Claus) in a mask of Maxim Luczky took a gift - a crate with the draft law which then suddenly exploded. Activists decided to "give this gift back to its creators". Students started entering the Committees building but security did not let them enter. Police tried to pull students out one by one. After that Luczky went out, the discussion started, in which he used the old and memorized by heart pseudo arguments. Students rejected to believe him. It resulted in that three representatives of students were allowed to be present at the committee meeting. No decisions about draft law "On higher education" were approved this day. Later the conclusion of the Main Scientific Expert Department of the Verkhovna Rada on the draft law "On higher education" came - it was negative.
- January 11 - three versions of the draft law "On higher education" (#9655, #9655-1, #9655-2) were included in the agenda of Verkhovna Rada. But later they were postponed to the next session.
- January 17 - one of the coauthors of the draft law "On higher education" #9655 and the head of the department of higher education Yaroslav Bolyubash held a press conference "Three draft laws on higher education: what is next?" in the "UNIAN" press center. Understanding that these questions will not be objectively discussed, activists at the same time held their own press conference "What will students expect from year 2012" near the building of "UNIAN".
- January 24 - a meeting of Prime Minister of Ukraine Mykola Azarov with representatives of higher educational institutions to discuss draft law #9655 without the participation of MES began in club of Cabinet of Ministers. Representatives of students were invited to meetings, but much fewer representatives were let to enter than it was declared, which caused a spontaneous protest. Police tried to stop this protest. Mykola Azarov allowed one more representative to enter, but another one who exited to help handle the situation was not allowed to return. The meeting resulted in creating the working group on the revision of the draft law "On higher education", which included representatives of protesters. The rector of Kyiv Polytechnic Institute Mykhailo Zghurovskyi was appointed the chairman of the group.
- January 30 - activists of the campaign published their advice on how to make the draft law better.
- February 2–17 - the working group on the revision of the draft law "On higher education" is working overtime and without days off in Kyiv Polytechnic Institute building. Approximately 60 people from 30 organizations and institutions took part in this work. The group received more than 3000 propositions, all of which were reviewed and processed. In the beginning, the group was divided into 4 subgroups: education, science, management and students issues. In the end they started to work together on all of these issues. All decisions were approved by consensus. The result of this work was the new text of the draft law which considered all propositions and composed of all best from #9655-1 and #9655-2. They recommended Mykola Azarov withdraw draft law #9655. Yuriy Miroshnichenko announced that he intends to withdraw his draft law #9655-2. Also the former opponent of student protesters the coordinator of MES-controlled public initiative "Students protection" Andriy Chernykh also supported the newly made version of the draft law.
- February 21 - the second meeting took park in club of Cabinet of Ministers during which the new draft law was approved and sent back to the group to legal revision for two weeks.
- February 25 - the Second All-Ukrainian Student Conferention of MES-controlled student organizations, which always supported draft laws of the ministry, took place in Mykolaiv. Kateryna Chepura was a representative of the working group on the revision of the draft law "On higher education". Participants of the conferention demonstrated complete ignorance of issued which had to be discussed. No clear decisions were approved.
- March 6 - the last meeting of the working group was held before the draft law was transferred to the Cabinet of Ministers for review.
- March 7 - the draft law developed by the working group was transferred to the Cabinet of Ministers for review and further registration in Verkhovna Rada.
- March 14 - the forum "The youth of the capital: the realities of today, the prospects of tomorrow" took place in the building of the Federation of Trade Unions of Ukraine in Kyiv, where education and the draft law "On higher education" were discussed. Activists of the campaign reminded that there still is a risk of old versions of the draft law to be adopted.
- March 27 - the round table "The legislative support for reform of higher education in Ukraine" took place in the building of news agency "Ukrinform". The reform of education, primarily through adoption of the draft law "On higher education", was actively discussed.
- April 25 - on the meeting of the Cabinet of Ministers Mykola Azarov announced that he made the final choice in favor of the draft law developed by the working group. The new working group, which included representatives of both public and government, was created at the meeting. Mykhailo Zghurovskyi was appointed chairman of the group again.
- May 10 - the meeting of the new working group was held, after which amended draft law was transferred to the Cabinet of Ministers.
- May 18 - the deputy Minister of Education Yevgen Sulima announced that MES will not put up with amendments of draft law #9655 made by working group.
- May 28 - activist expressed their concern about the recent actions of Yevgen Sulima and MES.
- June 1 - Mykola Azarov expressed his hope that the draft law "On higher education" will be adopted by Verkhovna Rada in 2012. At the request of members of the working group Mykola Azarov gave them time to review the document on June 11.
- December 3 - the Cabinet of Ministers approved the new version of the draft law "On higher education". Its text was never published.
- December 28 - activists of campaign published results of the year, where explained advances of the draft law "On higher education" developed by working group. On the same day the draft law "On higher education" #1187 by Sergiy Kivalov, Grigoriy Kalietnik and Mykola Soroka (pro-government MPs) was registered in Verkhovna Rada.
- December 29 - the newly registered draft law was criticised by the "Students protection" coordinator Andriy Chernykh.

=== 2013 ===
- January 11 - internet newspaper "Texty" published the text of draft law "On higher education" which had to be registered in Verkhovna Rada by Cabinet of Ministers on January 14. On the same day the draft law "On higher education" #1187-1 by Arseniy Yatsenyuk, Vitali Klitschko, Oleh Tyahnybok, Liliya Hrynevych, Lesya Orobets, Rostyslav Pavlenko, Pavlo Rozenko, Oleksandr Sych and Iryna Farion (parliamentary opposition) was registered.
- January 14 - activists announced that the text of draft law "On higher education" developed by the working group at the beginning of 2012 was completely rewritten after reviews in ministers and it is more like the previous version developed by MES. They announced that they are ready to resume the campaign in case of promotion and adoption of the remade draft law.
- January 21 - Viktor Baloha registered the draft law "On higher education" #1187-2 developed by the working group with no changes.
- February 7 - activists of campaign held a protest action "Shell game" during which in the form of performance they demonstrated that Mykola Azarov framed students as he promised to promote the draft law "On higher education" developed by the working group, but instead of that he started promoting the draft law "On higher education" #1187 which was hardly different from #7486-1 one promoted by Dmytro Tabachnyk earlier.
- February 27 - activists of campaign held an action near the building of Committees of the Verkhovna Rada demanding not to adopt the draft law "On higher education" #1187. Organizers made a performance during which they collected wishes of present students in ceramic piggy banks symbolising three MPs who registered the draft law. Later three representatives of students took part in the meeting of the committee. On this meeting representatives of parliamentary opposition announced that they will not vote for draft law #1187 but will vote for #1187-1 or #1187-2.
- March 6 - activists made picketing of MES demanding not to interfere in students life. In particular, activists mentioned the recent attempted raid on the Student Council of Kyiv when unknown people fictitiously elected Artem Nikiforov a chairman, in spite Oksana Dyachenko was genuinely elected on the same day. Titushky also came there. MES invited both sides for discussion of the issue.
- March 11 - Committee of the Verkhovna Rada on science and education recommended to accept as basic one of the alternative draft laws (#1187-1 or #1187-2) and asked the Main Committee to prepare for it fot the second reading.
- March 28 - a round table "Consequences of possible decrease of external independent evaluation role in entering higher educational institutions" took place in the building of publisher "Smoloskyp". Pupils from different cities of Ukraine took part in it. The criticised new rules introduced by draft law #1187.
- May 22 - during the presentation of three draft laws to MPs and the academic community the Chairman of Committee of the Verkhovna Rada on science and education Liliya Hrynevych announced that opposition understands the impossibility of adoption of draft law #1187-1 in the current Verkhovna Rada, so, for the future of education, it agrees to support a draft law #1187-2 similar by concept to one developed by the opposition. She also called Party of Regions to do the same for the future of higher education. Committee recommended accepting as basic the draft law #1187-2.
- June 3 - "Campaign to protect EIE (External independent evaluation)" started.
- June 6 - activists of the campaign held an action "Education higher and higher" in Lviv trying to draw attention to the situation in higher education. Participants demanded that Dmytro Tabachnyk held fair and transparent elections of the next rector of Ivan Franko University of Lviv. Also, they emphasized on risks of the adoption of draft law #1187.
- September 1 - activist of campaign held an action in a form of a theatrical play in Kyiv to draw attention to the risks of draft laws #1187 and #2060а. The plot of the action was that draft law authors and Dmytro Tabachnyk tried to give pupil, student and teacher "gifts" that symbolised bribery, increasing the amount of fees for education, reducing the number of students who receive scholarships and reducing the autonomy of universities.

== Campaign to protect EIE ==
This civil campaign started on June 3, 2013, to protect External independent evaluation from canceling or considerable decrease of its role. It was started by civil movement Vidsich as a part of "Against degradation of education" as a response to registration of draft law on amending the law of Ukraine "On higher education" #2060а on May 18, 2013. During it activists mostly were distributing leaflets near higher educational institutions, in which were described consequences EIE from the adoption of the draft law "On higher education" #2060а and #1187. There were not a lot of incidents. In Vinnytsia near Vinnytsia National Agrarian University activists and journalists were constantly attacked by "Voluntary people's squad". Grigoriy Kalietnik, a coauthor of the draft law "On higher education" #1187, was a rector at that time.

== Results ==
All attempts to adopt draft laws, against which students protested, failed.

On April 8, 2014, Verkhovna Rada voted in the first reading for draft law "On higher education" #1187-2 developed by working group of Mykhailo Zghurovskyi. After that voting for a draft law in the second reading was groundlessly delayed. Students held several actions demanding that draft law be adopted sooner. On July 1 the draft law was adopted in the second reading and on August 1 was signed by the President. And finally, it came into force on September 6, 2014.

== Links ==
- Against degradation of education on Facebook
