= Kateryna Chepura =

Ukrainian director and activist

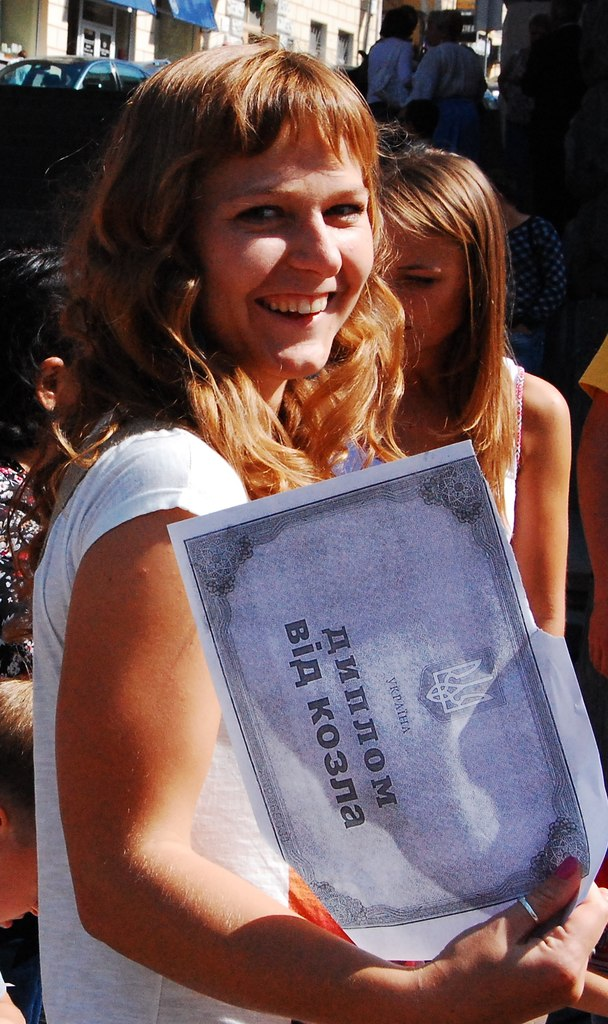
- At the action against Dmytro Tabachnyk, 2012
- Born: Kateryna Petrivna Chepura; December 23, 1986; Kyiv, Ukrainian SSR, Soviet Union
- Occupations: Theatrical director, Social Activist
- Years active: since 2004
- Spouse: Artur Pereverzev

Katerýna Petrívna Chepúra (Ukrainian: Катерина Петрівна Чепура, born December 23, 1986, Kyiv) is a Ukrainian theatrical director and social activist.

== Biography ==
Kateryna studied at school number 265 in Kyiv. In 2009, she finished directing and choreography studies at Kyiv National University of Culture and Arts and received a director's degree.

In 2008, Kateryna Chepura organized and managed a drama play called "Between the Two Forces" by Volodymyr Vynnychenko as her graduate project. The play received recognition and was performed at various stages for several years (10th show — in November 2010). During this time, it has been viewed by numerous Ukrainian intellectuals and activists. The actor and art director of the Ivan Franko National Academic Drama Theater Bohdan Stupka, after watching this play, offered an internship opportunity to Kateryna.

In 2010, Kateryna Chepura started her internship at the Ivan Franko National Academic Drama Theater, and in 2011, she began to work as a director in the theater. Since 2010, she organized two performances based on Volodymyr Vynnychenko's plays "A Way to Beauty" and "Natus" on the small stage and the children's musical "Cinderella" on a large stage. In 2011, "A Way to Beauty" play was nominated for a theater award called "Kyiv's Pectoral" a "Best directing debut" nomination.

In September 2012, after Bohdan Stupka death, Kateryna was fired from the theater.

== Social activism ==
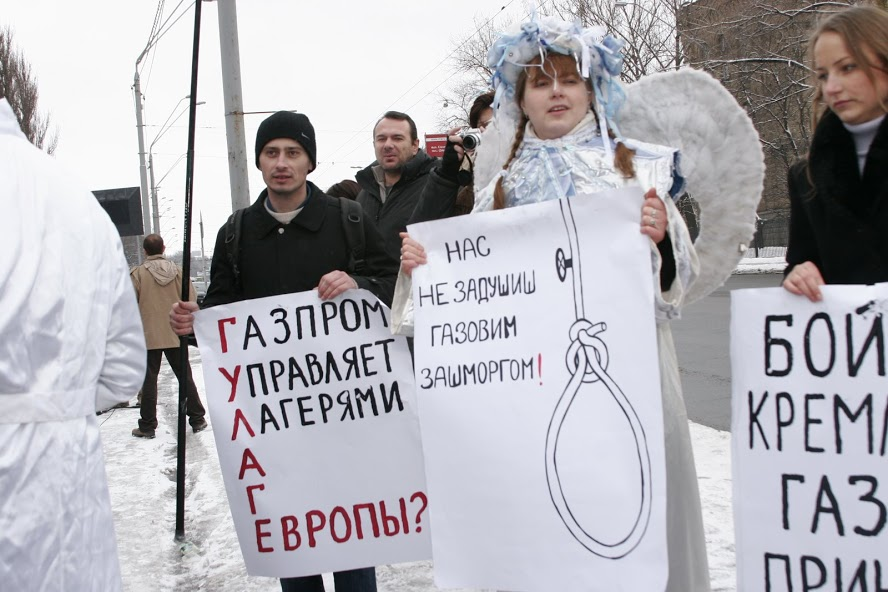
"Remember about the Gas — Do not buy Russian goods!" campaign, 2009

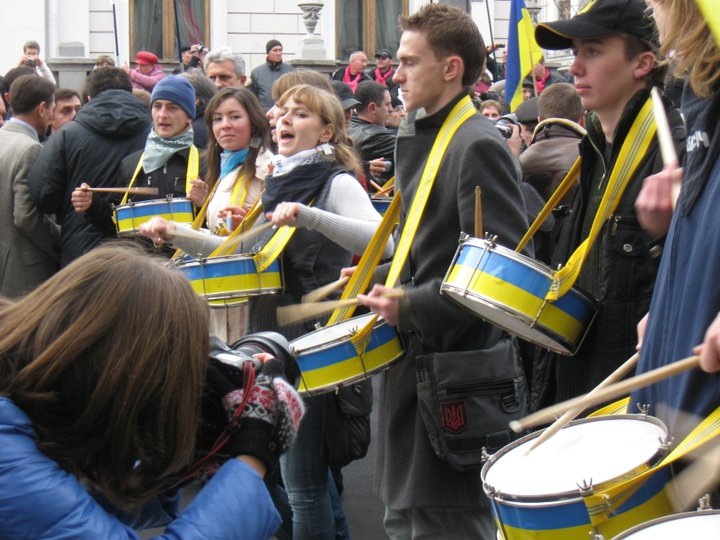
At the action of the "Tax Maidan", 2010

Kateryna Chepura was involved in social activities since she was 17 years old. Since 2004, she participated in the "PORA" (black) and after in "Alliance Maidan". Since 2010, she is an activist Civic movement "Vidsich".

=== Campaign "Against education degradation" ===
January 24, 2012 — picket by the Civic movement "Vidsich" as part of the campaign "Against education degradation" took place at the club of Cabinet of Ministers of Ukraine, during the meeting of Prime Minister Mykola Azarov with public and academic community members in terms of discussion of government bill number 9655 "On Higher Education". By request of protesters, Kateryna Chepura was allowed to participate in the discussion as a representative of students' interests. Although most participants approved the final discussion paper and stated that it is ready for approval by the Verkhovna Rada, after hearing the activist's requirements, Mykola Azarov still decided to create a work group to resolve "controversial norms" in the bill. The work group was formed, including Kateryna Chepura. Later, the activist was accused of unauthorized organization of a mass meeting that took place at the Club of Cabinet of Ministers of Ukraine on January 24. April 4, 2012 — court session on Kateryna Chepura case in Pechersk Court of Kyiv. After 40-minutes session, the court closed the case due to the absence of evidence.

=== Campaign "Revenge for division of Ukraine" ===
Kateryna Chepura was actively participating in the "Revenge for division of Ukraine" campaign in 2012. At June 18, police attempted to illegally detain Kateryna and other activists. In Novohrad-Volynskyi, protocol on administrative offense was unlawfully drawn up under police supervision but it didn't have any continuation.

On August 3, Kateryna, with other 4 activists, was detained by police in Sevastopol. Law enforcement officials explained their actions by saying that activists organized this peaceful event without notification of the authorities. In the police office, activists were accused of violation of the Code of Ukraine on Administrative Offences, in particular for violation of election campaign rules. Later, after the activists' release, it became known that the police committed protocol change, including the protocol of Kateryna Chepura.

On August 5, Kateryna Chepura and another activist were unlawfully detained by police in Simferopol. Activists were accused of violation of the Code of Ukraine on Administrative Offences, in particular for violation of election campaign rules. The court found the activists guilty despite the numerous mistakes in the protocol. Activists rejected their guilt and it was interpreted by the judge as an attempt to evade responsibility. Later, it became known that the police committed forgery.

On August 8, Kateryna Chepura with 6 activists was unlawfully detained by police in Donetsk. Police used brute physical force against the activist. Protocol on violation of the Code of Ukraine on Administrative Offences was drawn up against Kateryna and other activists.

September 15, when distributing leaflets as a part of campaign in Kyiv, Kateryna and two other activists were beaten and detained by Solomyanskyi district police and unknown people in civilian clothes. At the police department Kateryna started to feel very bad, so ambulance was called to help her. Protocol on violation of Code of Ukraine on Administrative Offences, in particular on "persistent disobedience to police officers" was drawn up against activists. Later they were also accused in "violation of election campaign rules". All courts cases were won by Kateryna Chepura and other activists.

On October 17, activists were distributing campaign leaflets in Korostyshiv during a concert of Honored Artist of Ukraine Oleh Havrylyuk in the local House of Culture. Journalists of 5 Kanal were not allowed to enter the hall, after what they wrote a statement to police about obstruction to journalistic activities and also provided further explanation. Activist Kateryna Chepura witnessed the incident and also was taking part in providing information to police. After these events, police started to investigate "Vidsich" leaflets distribution campaigns that was announced on 5 Kanal journalist Oksana Trokoz Facebook page. She started receiving questions about Kateryna Chepura and also she was told that there are criminal proceedings against "Vidsich". December 11, police interrogated Oksana Trokoz again and continued to ask about Kateryna Chepura. The journalist was provided with an order for covert investigation (search) actions.

=== Euromaidan ===
During and after Euromaidan, Kateryna Chepura was chotova (platoon commander) of "Women chota" (Women platoon) that was a part of the 16th sotnia of Self-Defense of the Maidan in Kyiv.

== Theatrical activity ==
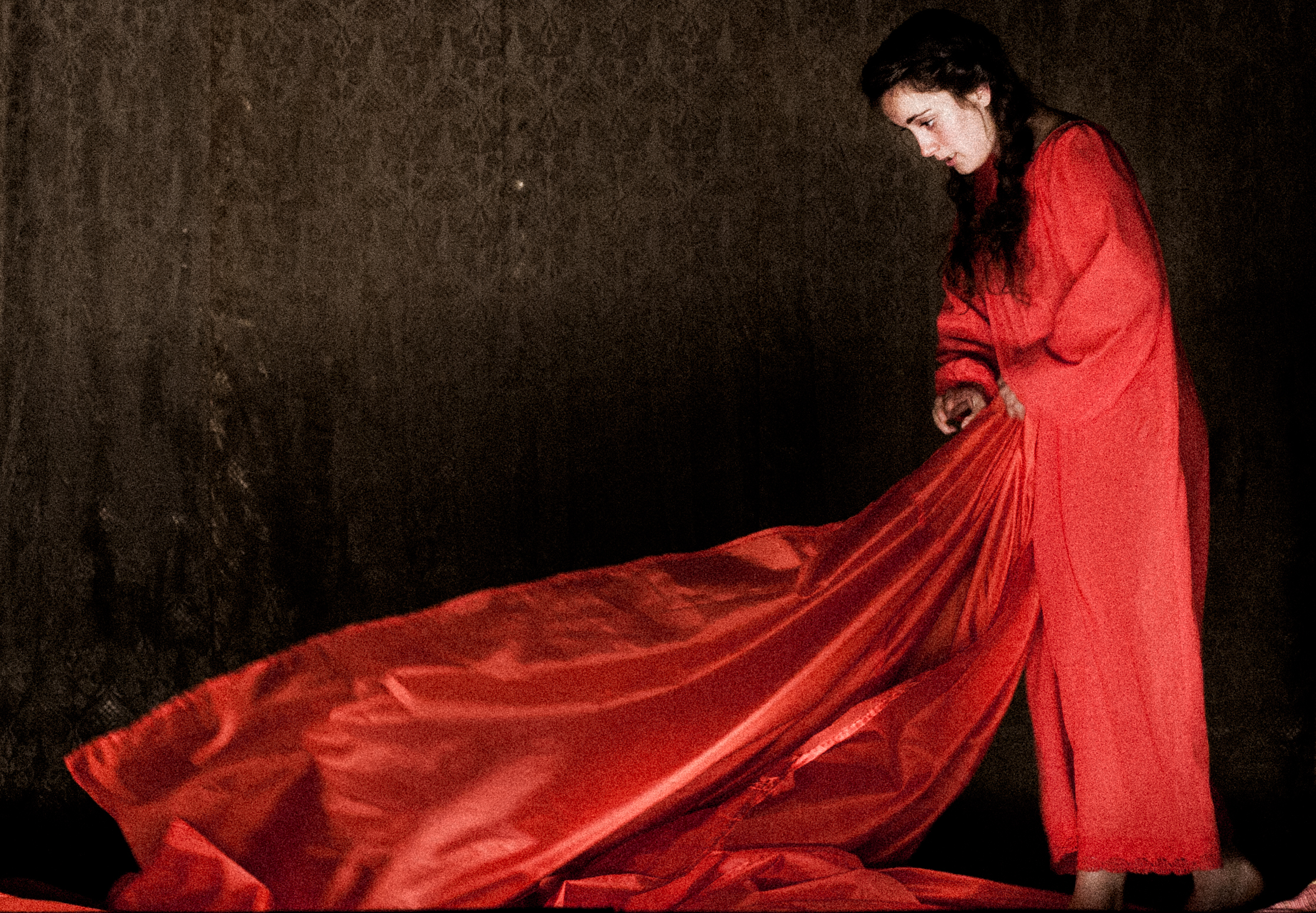
At the premiere of performance "Kateryna", 2015

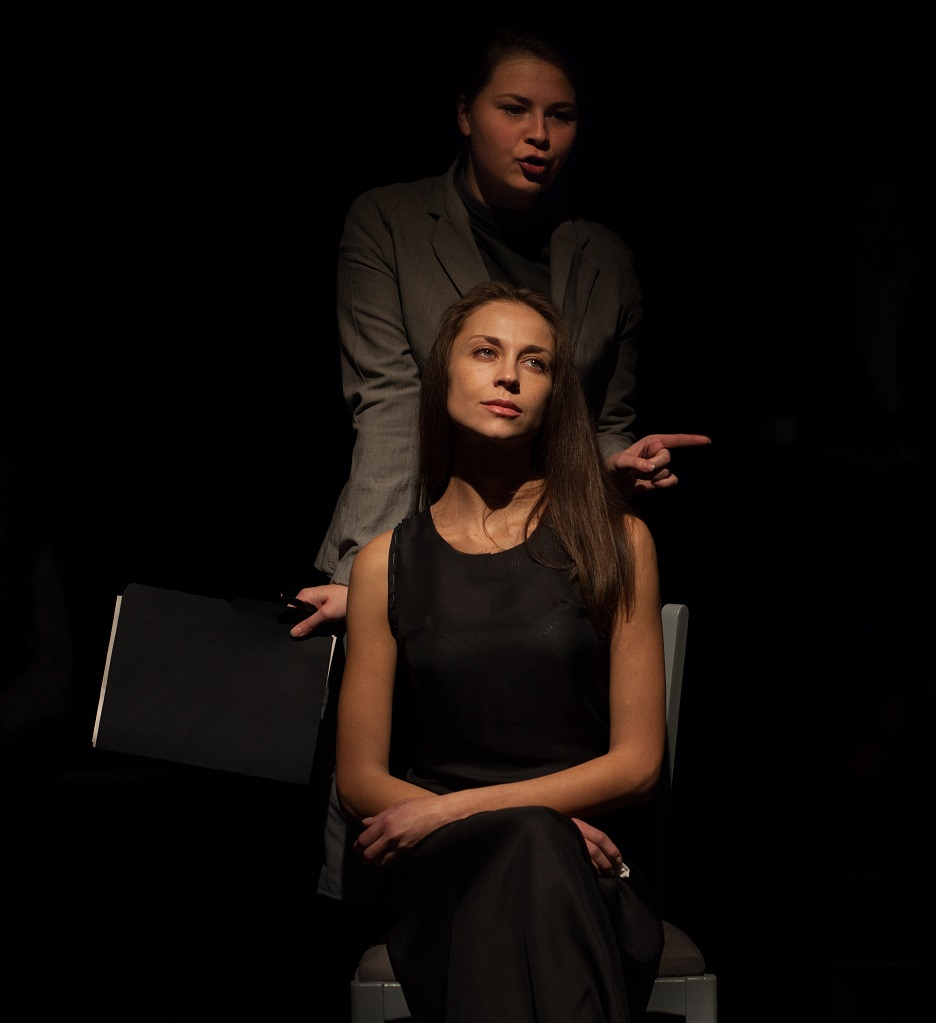
At the pre-premiere of performance "Night of January 16th", 2016

=== Directing ===
Kateryna Chepura is director-producer of theatrical performances, mainly based on plays of Ukrainian writers.

- At different stages:
  - "Between the Two Forces" (based on Volodymyr Vynnychenko).
- As a director-producerin the Ivan Franko National Academic Drama Theater:
  - "A Way to Beauty" (based on Volodymyr Vynnychenko, premiere — April 10, 2010);
  - "Cinderella" (musical-tale, art director — Honored Artist Petro Ilchenko);
  - "Natus" (based on Volodymyr Vynnychenko, premiere — April 1, 2012).
- As the director-producer in Kyiv-Mohyla Theatre Centre "Pasika":
  - "Boyarynya" (based on Lesia Ukrainka, premiere — October 6, 2013).
  - "Kateryna" (based on Taras Shevchenko, premiere — August 23, 2015, on the 2nd festival "She.Fest" in Moryntsi).
- At stage of The Moscow Drama Theater under the direction of Armen Dzhigarkhanyan:
  - The play "The Devil's School" (based on French dramatist Eric-Emmanuel Schmitt; presentation at the Second International Festival of Arts in Moscow — February 26, 2014).

=== Art Director ===
Kateryna often appears as an art director of her theatrical performances. For example, she was an art director and costume designer for plays "Natus" and "A Way to Beauty".

== Family ==
Kateryna is married since 2013. Her husband is Arthur Pereverzev.
