= Pora =

Pora may refer to:

== People ==
- Rizky Pora (born 1989), Indonesian football player
- Rodney Pora, rugby player
- Teina Pora, New Zealander

== Places ==
- Pora (river), Italy
- Monte Pora, Italy
- Ponta Porã, Brazil

== Other ==
- PORA, Ukrainian civic youth organization
- PORA (Russian youth group)
