= Porra (disambiguation) =

Porra may refer to:

- Fried dough similar to churro
- Pedro Rivera (footballer) (born 1976)
- Lauri Porra (born 1977), Finnish musician
- Maurice Porra (1906‒50), French rugby player

== See also ==
- Pora (disambiguation)
