= Tax Maidan =

2010–2011 protest against tax reform in Ukraine

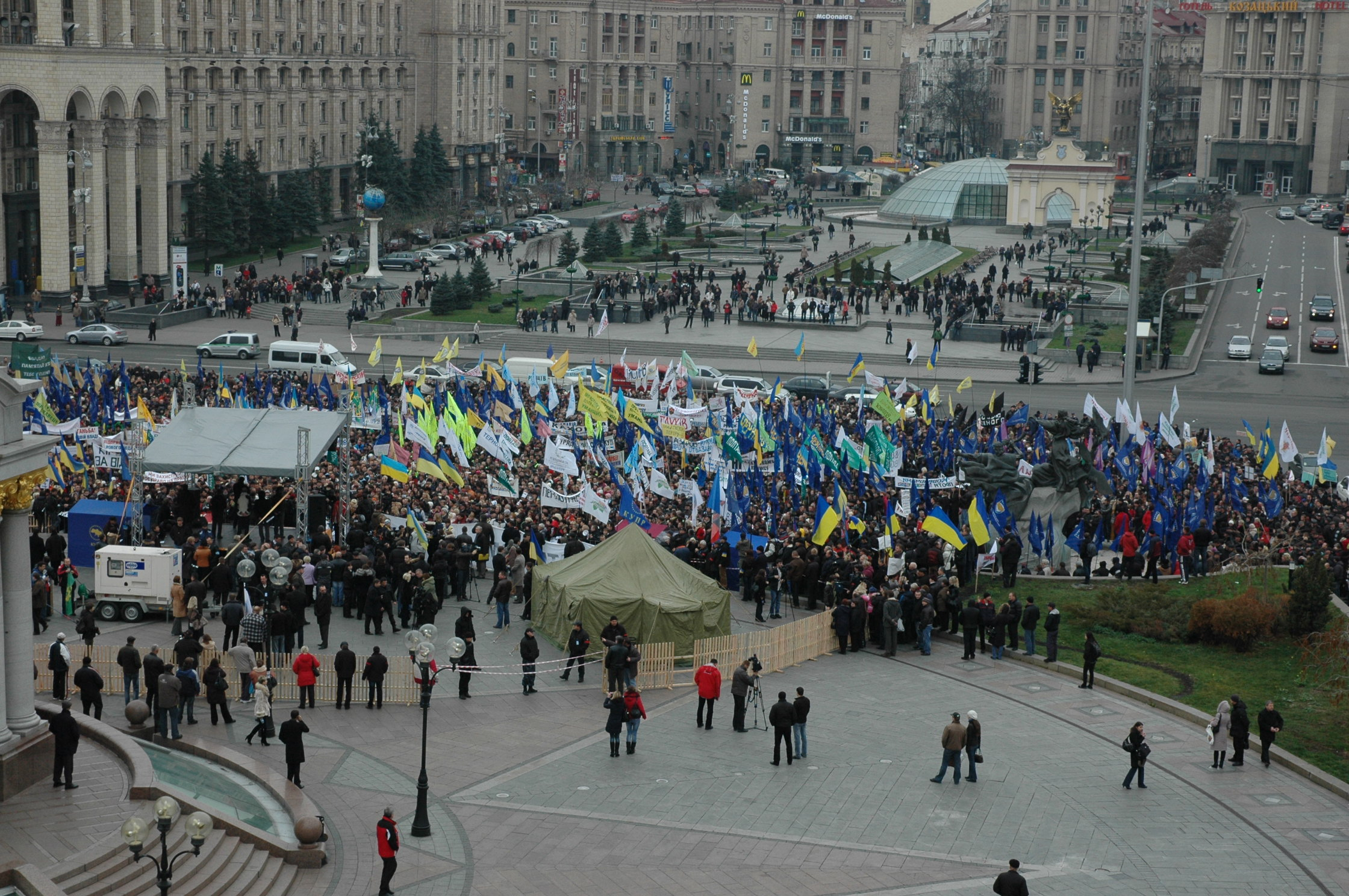
- Protests at Maidan Nezalezhnosti, 29 November
- Date: 21 November 2010 – January 2011
- Location: Maidan Nezalezhnosti, Kyiv, Ukraine
- Caused by: Proposed tax reforms by the first Azarov government
- Goals: Cancellation of the tax reforms; Protection of small businesses; Resignation of the first Azarov government; Snap parliamentary elections
- Result: Government victory: Protests forcefully dispersed; Azarov–Tihipko Code passed in 2011; Criminal cases opened against activists

Parties
Spilna Sprava; Confederation of Free Trade Unions of Ukraine; Vidsich; Yulia Tymoshenko Bloc	Government of Ukraine; Titushky

Lead figures
Volodymyr Dorosh; Mykhailo Volynets; Mykhaylo Svystovych; Oksana Prodan	Viktor Yanukovych; Mykola Azarov; Serhiy Tihipko

The Tax Maidan (Ukrainian: Податковий майдан, romanised: Podatkovyi maidan) was a 2010–2011 protest against a proposal by the first Azarov government to reform the tax system of Ukraine by eliminating a number of tax exemptions provided to small businesses. The protesters, a coalition of trade unions, small businesses and groups in opposition to Viktor Yanukovych, argued that the tax reforms would harm small businesses and sought to force the government's resignation, as well as snap parliamentary elections. Supporters of the Tax Code, such as prime minister Mykola Azarov, argued that the Tax Code would decrease taxation and improve the economy. The protests were ultimately dispersed by the Militsiya and titushky on 3 December, with some protests continuing until January 2011.

== Background ==
Following the dissolution of the Soviet Union, small- and medium-sized enterprises have made up the largest portion of Ukraine's labour market. Post-communist Ukrainian governments have pursued policies in favour of larger enterprises, including by law enforcement harassment of small- and medium-sized enterprises and preferential treatment of large companies. Human rights activist Yevhen Zakharov argues that employee-employer relationships under large corporations "are often similar to feudal relations", and the Ukrainian government, particularly during the presidency of Leonid Kuchma, encouraged rent-seeking by big business and collusion between the Ukrainian state and large-scale enterprises.

Most small- and medium-sized enterprises in early post-Soviet Ukraine primarily worked in the shadow economy due to high taxation. In an attempt to counteract this, Kuchma introduced the Single Tax system in 1998, reducing taxes and simplifying tax procedures on small businesses as part of a drive to increase tax contributions and economic growth. Larger enterprises also used loopholes in the Single Tax to avoid taxation, including by registering staff as owners of small businesses or formally separating parts of their companies into small businesses.

=== Azarov–Tihipko Code ===
After his election in 2010, president Viktor Yanukovych proposed to reform the Tax Code of Ukraine, particularly the Single Tax, in order to reduce abuse of the Single Tax. The first Azarov government introduced the proposed reform on 4 September 2010, with prime minister Mykola Azarov claiming that more than 5,000 proposals were considered and that a group of business owners, those paying the Single Tax, representatives of the public and taxation experts had been consulted prior to the presentation of the new Tax Code. The reformed Tax Code proposed by the first Azarov government became popularly known as the Azarov–Tihipko Code (Ukrainian: Кодекс Азарова-Тігіпка, romanised: Kodeks Azarova-Tihipka, abbreviated KAT) after its authors, Azarov and deputy prime minister for economic affairs Serhiy Tihipko.

Azarov pledged that the revised Tax Code would be the "most liberal in Europe", and that tax rates in the new code would be lower than any other European state as a result of eliminating a significant number of taxes. He further declared that the new tax code would reduce income taxes from 25% to 19%, with further gradual reductions resulting in a rate of 16% by 2014, as well as lower taxation on foreign investment and light industry.

Economist Michał Kozak describes the reforms to the Tax Code as favouring the Ukrainian oligarchs. The Azarov–Tihipko Code was condemned by opposition politicians, with the Communist Party of Ukraine initiating procedures in the Verkhovna Rada (Ukrainian parliament) to remove Tihipko as minister. People's Deputy from the Communist Party Leonid Hrach publicly floated a motion of no confidence in the Azarov government, describing its reforms as destructive to the middle class. Serhiy Teryokhin of the Yulia Tymoshenko Bloc said of the code:

Це Податковий кодекс обговорювався паном Колесніковим, паном Клюєвим, паном Азаровим та представниками великого бізнесу десь у кабінеті на Грушевського. Решта – це антураж.

[This Tax Code was discussed by Mr. Kolesnikov, by Mr. Klyuyev, by Mr. Azarov and by representatives of big business at some office on Hrushevsky. Everything else is an illusion.]

== Protests ==
On 20 November 2010, a council of small- and medium-sized entrepreneurs gathered in Vinnytsia, where they together resolved to coordinate protests against the Azarov–Tihipko Code. The Tax Maidan began on 21 November 2010, the day before the sixth anniversary of the Orange Revolution, with a group of small business owners travelling to Kyiv from the city of Cherkasy. 30 buses holding protesters arrived; organisers told BBC News Ukrainian that an additional 140 had departed from Cherkasy before being stopped by the State Automobile Inspectorate.

At the first day of protests, a tent city was formed at Kyiv's Maidan Nezalezhnosti. In spite of statements by protest organiser Alla Alieksientseva against the involvement of political forces in the protests, the Tax Maidan received the backing of the Yulia Tymoshenko Bloc. People's Deputy and Confederation of Free Trade Unions of Ukraine chairman Mykhailo Volynets spoke to protesters at the tent city, as did ex-Tymoshenko Bloc deputy Oleh Liashko, who joined protesters in singing Razom nas bahato. In addition to preventing the passage of the Azarov–Tihipko Code and increased protections for small businesses, protesters also sought the resignation of Azarov's government and snap parliamentary elections.

Negotiations between protesters (represented by Volynets, Oksana Prodan and Mykhaylo Svystovych, among others) and the government (represented by minister of finance Fedir Yaroshenko) resulted in Yaroshenko agreeing to support a veto the Tax Code on 28 November. In spite of this, the protesters vowed to continue until a conclusive deal that included Azarov's veto of the code, and called for a one-day general strike to be held on 29 November.

The protests were partially coordinated on Twitter, with supporters using the hashtag #kat_ua to share information and organise protests via mobile phones. The Spilna Sprava group formed from small- and medium-sized enterprises during the protests. A council was established to ensure the protests' coordination, including anti-Yanukovych group Vidsich, trade unions (particularly the Confederation of Free Trade Unions of Ukraine, chaired by Volynets) and small businesses. The Yulia Tymoshenko Bloc also contributed to the protests, with Volodymyr Yavorivsky and Natalia Korolevska overseeing coordination efforts. The alliance donated gloves and socks to the protesters.

The European Union response to the Tax Maidan was limited, in contrast to their previous response to the 2004 Orange Revolution and their later response to the 2014 Euromaidan protests. Political scientist Ostap Kushnir argues that this was caused by a lack of interest in Ukraine due to the Great Recession and the Euro area crisis, as well as the comparatively small size of the protests.

By January 2011, the protests dispersed. The total size of the largest protests is disputed; academics Olga Onuch and Gwendolyn Sasse record a peak size of 6,000–10,000, while think tank Chatham House claims a larger figure of 90,000. After the dispersal of the Tax Maidan, the organisers stated that new protests would come in the spring.

== Government response and dispersal ==
Tihipko reacted angrily to the Tax Maidan, saying of the protesters:

I hate the proletariat. ... The idea that we should be listening to ordinary people and taking their opinion into account before amending the Tax Code is absurd.

On 26 November, after a ceremony commemmorating Holodomor Memorial Day, Yanukovych and Azarov travelled to Maidan Nezalezhnosti, where Yanukovych promised to veto the Azarov–Tihipko Code and raised the potential of firing individuals involved in its drafting. These promises were rejected by the coordinators of the protests, who vowed to continue until snap elections were held. The Administrative Court of Kyiv imposed a ban on public events across Kyiv on 27 November, lasting until 3 December.

On 2 December, the Militsiya law enforcement service was deployed around the tent city on Maidan Nezalezhnosti. Oleksandr Danyliuk, one of the coordinators of the protests, cautioned that a violent dispersal would soon begin, and at 4:00 on the morning of 3 December the protest was violently dispersed, with members of the Militsiya attacking the tent city with batons. The Militsiya were also joined by individuals from outside of Kyiv, who attacked protesters.

Yanukovych initially made repeated promises in media interviews not to launch criminal prosecutions of activists involved in the protests. Criminal proceedings were launched against activists a few weeks after the end of the protests, with charges of deliberately destroying property by erecting a tent city on Maidan Nezalezhnosti. Within a year of the protests, the Azarov–Tihipko Code was reintroduced in the Verkhovna Rada, where it passed without significant opposition before subsequently being signed into law by Yanukovych.
