= Vidsich =

Ukrainian political organization, 2010-

- Civic movement "Vidsich"
- Громадянський рух "Відсіч"
- Logo of Vidsich. Motto is Time to rebuff.
- Founded: 20 February 2010
- Key people: Without leaders
- Website: vidsich.info

The сivic movement "Vidsich" (Ukrainian: Відсіч, lit. 'Rebuff') is an active Ukrainian nonviolent social movement created in 2010 as a reaction to the policies of then President of Ukraine Victor Yanukovych and the "pro-Russian" tendencies associated with his administration. During his administration, Vidsich focused on protesting against Yanukovych's increasing authoritarianism as well as the policies his government enacted. During Euromaidan, Vidsich became one of the movement's leading groups.

As of 2022, Vidsich focuses on protecting human rights, civil liberties and constitutional freedoms. Since the Revolution of Dignity, the movement has also advocated for boycotts of Russian products and the promotion of Ukrainian culture.

Vidsich aims to unite activists who are convinced that people cannot be neutral with regard to the political and social situation in Ukraine. Vidsich's aim is in creating a strong national movement which can protect the interests of Ukrainians and Ukraine in general.

== Founding ==
After Victor Yanukovich won the 2010 presidential elections, citizens who supported his opposition, including many who had previously taken part in protests and campaigns, decided to gather and discuss the likely changes to the social and political situation in Ukraine in light of the handover of power.

This conference took place in Kyiv on 20 February 2010. This date is considered to be the Vidsich founding date as the conference led to decisions in favour of further self-organization and activity, with participants sketching out the principles and directions for the future of the nascent movement. In attendance were participants of previous opposition movements ("Granite revolution", "Ukraine without Kuchma" movement, civic committee "Za pravdu!" ("For truth"), civic campaigns "Pora!" ("It's time"), etc.), and other opposition-supporting members of Ukrainian society.

== Principles of the movement ==
- Nonviolence
- Absence of leaders
- Openness
- No party affiliation / Non-partisan
- Consensus decision-making
- Sacrificion
- Copyleft

== Actions and protest campaigns ==
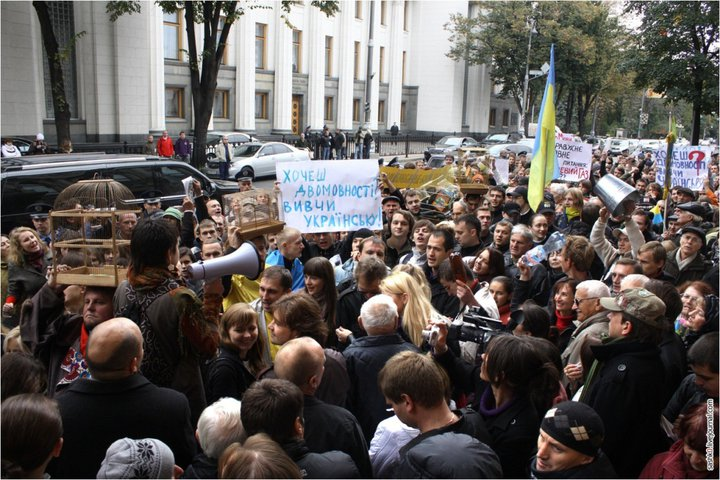
December 2010 Vidsich protest in support of their "Start the work, stop the talk!" campaign.

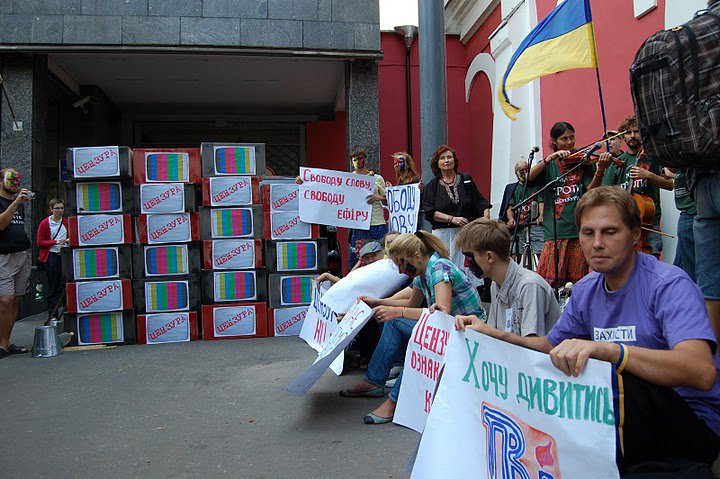
2010 Vidsich protest in support of independent Ukrainian television channels.

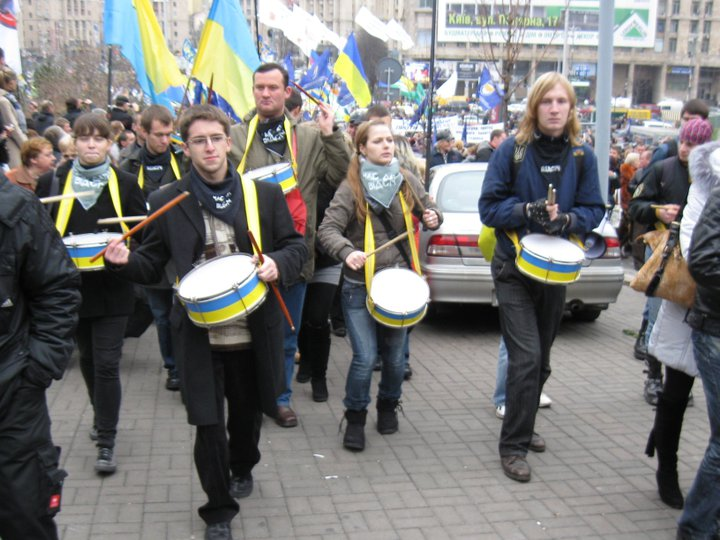
Vidsich demonstration against new Tax code in 2010.

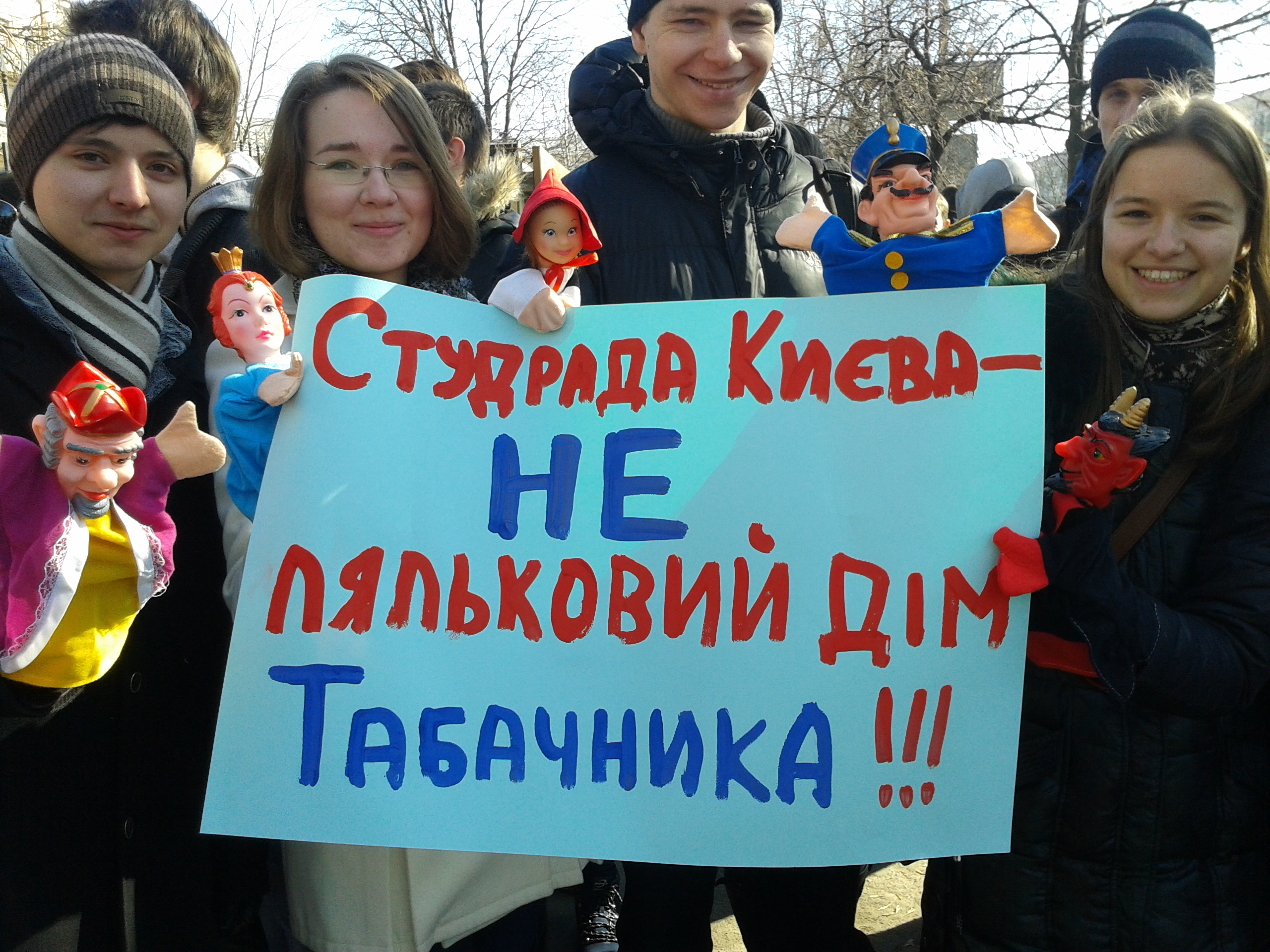
On action against raiding Kyiv Student Council by representatives of Dmytro Tabachnyk. Kyiv. 6 April 2013

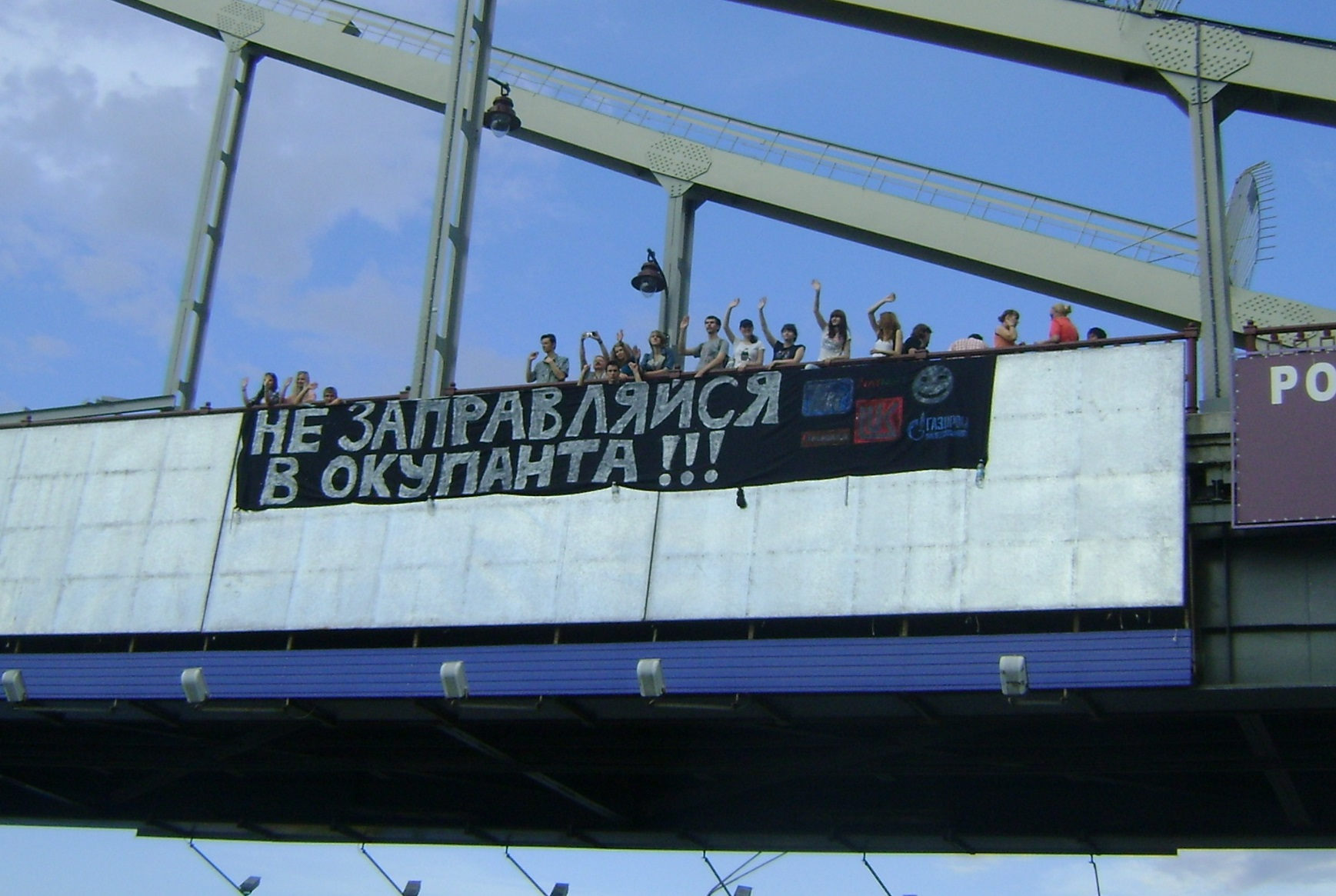
The action of putting up a banner calling not to buy Russian gasoline. Kyiv. 29 May 2014

From the March 2010, the civic movement "Vidsich" took part in hundreds of events (mostly street actions, warning strikes, sit down strikes, public hearings, round tables) in many cities of Ukraine, made either by ourselves, either in cooperation with other organizations.

Examples include:

- "Campaign Against Tabachnyk" / "Anti-Tobacco Campaign" (Ukrainian: АнтиТабачна кампанія, Russian: АнтиТабачная кампания) – aimed to protect Ukrainian education and science from the decisions made by the Minister of Education and Science Dmytro Tabachnyk, who had generated controversy amongst pro-European Ukrainians by having a history of making anti-Ukrainian, chauvinistic, pro-Russian, xenophobic statements.
- The campaign "No to Police State" (Ukrainian: Ні поліцейській державі, Russian: Нет полицейскому государству) – demanded impartial investigation and worthy punishment of those, as well as an identification and prosecution of those guilty in the case of the student Ihor Indylo's death, in other cases and against police abuse. The campaign also sought to protest against Yanukovych's increasing authoritanism.
- A campaign against the "2450" bill, which would significantly decrease the freedom of peaceful assembly, and for protection of the right to peaceful protest. The campaign also held solidarity actions with the 2011–2013 Russian anti-Putin protestors, and Belarusian anti-Lukashenko protestors, who aimed for the right to peaceful assembly in their countries.
- The campaign "Start the work, stop the talk!" (Ukrainian: Займіться ділом, а не язиком!, Russian: Займитесь делом, а не языком!) – which sought to prevent the new legislation "On languages in Ukraine" #1015-3, "On the Principles of State Language Policy" #9073 and its modifications (main: Legislation on languages in Ukraine), which would have prioritised the Russian language in Ukraine over Ukrainian for the first time since 1991, instead of the two languages having previously been equal in status. Activists argued this would ignite a "language" conflict and reduce the status of the Ukrainian language in the public space and in the lives of Ukrainians.
  - The campaign "Revenge for division of Ukraine" aimed at preventing the adoption of the Law "On the Principles of State Language Policy" (Bill No. 9073, Law No. 5029-VI) and later the elimination of its negative effects. It consisted of bringing down the poll numbers of the political parties and MPs who voted for this law and other persons who contributed to the adoption of this law.
- The campaign "Against degradation of education" (Ukrainian: Проти деградації освіти, Russian: Против деградации образования) - sought to prevent the adoption of the Bill "On Higher Education"" (#7486-1, #9655 and else), which would have lowered the civil liberties of students, as well as reducing their social protection. Vidsich also argued the law allowed for corruption in educational facilities.
  - Advocacy of External independent testing (EIT) – against the adoption of draft laws No. 1187 and No. 2060а minimizing the significance and function of EIT.
- The organisation of protests against the new Tax Code, which forced the government to cancel its immediate adoption (it was adopted later with revisions) as well as refuse the idea of swift embranchment of the Housing, Labour, and Pension Codes.
- Calling for action against censorship and for freedom of speech, which became a particularly divisive issue during Yanukovych's presidency. In particular – against frequency lowering for channels "5" and "TVi", "STB", and for commemorating the memory of dead journalists since Ukrainian independence.
- Campaign for commemoration of the famine genocide Holodomor victims of 1932–1933, promotion of rename the toponyms, which cares the names of organizers and executors of genocide.
- Campaign "Do not buy Russian goods!" is a campaign to boycott Russian goods after the trade export blockade against Ukraine by Russia, started in August 2013; later – in response to the military invasion of Russia in Ukraine, started in March 2014.
  - Campaign "Boycott Russian Films". At the end of September 2014 the campaign on Russian cinema boycott started spreading. Particularly it is about boycott of films and serials, produced in Russia and broadcast on Ukrainian television and shown in the cinemas – first of all those, in which Russian security structures are popularized or signs of ukrainophobia are present. Activists also called to boycott Russian actors and directors, who supported Vladimir Putin's policy concerning warfare in Ukraine in 2014. During September activists conducted several monitorings on presence of Russian content in the Ukrainian television.
- Participation in "Euromaidan", including the organization of student strikes and campaign of boycott Party of Regions. During Euromaidan "Vidsich" in Kyiv formed a sotnia joined to Self-Defense of the Maidan, where received the 16th number.
- Events organized for raising funds, gathering of products, equipment etc. for Ukrainian military forces (particularly – for 95th OAMBr) that are fighting in the east of Ukraine. Also – demand actions for: returning control of eastern Ukraine and Crimea; setting requirements to the Ukrainian government to provide all necessary items and services for Ukrainian military forces;
- "Stop "Ze" Revanch" campaign against Volodymyr Zelenskyy, then a candidate in the 2019 Ukrainian presidential election. Consisted mainly of mass spreading of leaflets, stickers and other materials with information criticising the candidate.
- "Red Lines" campaign. Activists drew some "red lines" for the new Ukrainian government (in particular for president, Parliament and executive branch) which it should not cross. In case the government do cross those lines, activists promise it will face an immediate resistance and protests from the civil society. Those "red" lines are divided into six topics: Ukrainization, European-Atlantic integration, decommunization, Armed Forces, relations with Russia, territorial structure and integrity. Any steps to revert or sabotage Ukrainization, European-Atlantic integration, decommunization or reforms in Armed Forces, to restore good relations with Russia, to rearrange territorial structure or to violate territorial integrity will be considered as crossing the red lines. The campaign started with a performance near the building of the Office of the President of Ukraine on 4 July 2019. From that moment activists are reporting about their spreading of leaflets about red lines, (Note: Vidsich in Facebook, 7 July 2019) (Note: Vidsich in Facebook, 9 July 2019) and also about spreading leaflets against the TV presenter and, at the moment, parliamentary candidate in electoral district 94 from the party Servant of the People Oleksandr Dubinsky, who was claimed by activists to have crossed the red lines long ago. (Note: Vidsich in Facebook, 8 July 2019) Later, Vidsich also started spreading leaflets against other parliamentary candidates, who in their opinion have crossed the red lines: Maksim Lutsky, candidate in electoral district 222 from Opposition Platform – For Life; (Note: Vidsich in Facebook, 17 July 2019) Vitaly Zhuravsky, self-nominated candidate from electoral district 66; (Note: idsich in Facebook (videostream), 18 July 2019) (Note: Vidsich in Facebook, 19 July 2019) Serhiy Leshchenko, self-nominated candidate from electoral district 220 (Note: Vidsich in Facebook, 19 July 2019) (Note: Vidsich in Facebook, 18 July 2019) (Note: Vidsich in Facebook, 19 July 2019) and Opposition Platform – For Life in general. (Note: Vidsich in Facebook, 23 July 2019)

Also, CM "Vidsich" was an organizer or a participant in actions: of solidarity actions with Gorky park defenders; against Black Sea fleet of Russian Federation being on Ukraine's territory; for defending Ukrainian translations of the foreign movies; against persecution of historians and history rewriting; for promotions of state symbols; "Easter together" (students of the south and east of Ukraine staying in the families of their age-mates in the city of Lviv); Against museum throw-away from Lavra; "Ukrainian broadcast – on air!"; against the Mazepa street renaming; in memory of 66 anniversary of the Crimean Tatars deportation; "Ruined Khreshchatyk – we remember!"; "Doughnuts for Donetsk region people" (Ukrainian: Пампухи для донеччан); collection of signatures for restoration of traffic of some suburban trains, and actions against the made-up ticket deficit in cash desks of Ukrzaliznytsya (Ukrainian railroads); students "arms" demonstration; creative action of protest against "tour" bill #8757 and other activities.

== Notable activists ==
- Mykhaylo Svystovych
- Kateryna Chepura
- Yulia Mykytenko

== See also ==
- Solidarity (Polish trade union)
- Otpor!
- Pora!
