= Mykhaylo Svystovych =

Ukrainian activist, journalist, and economist

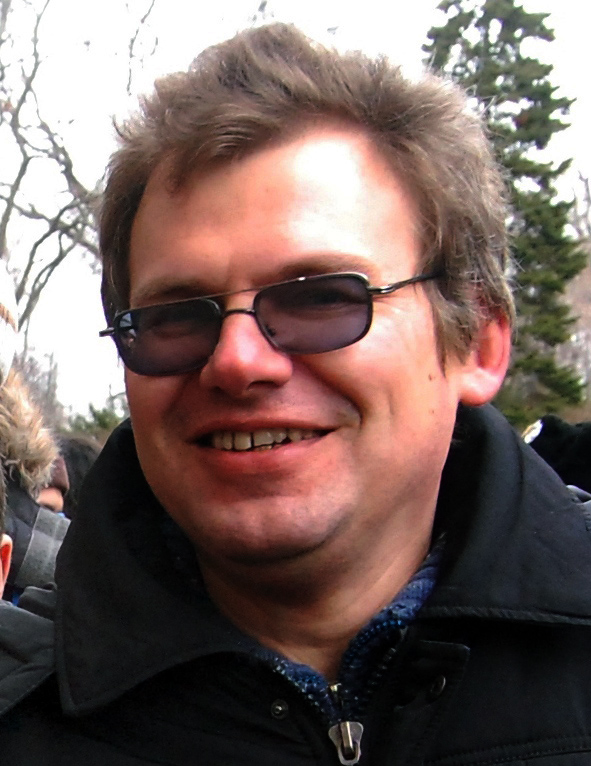
- Svystovych, 2011
- Born: Mykhaylo Bohdanovych Svystovych; December 11, 1968 (age 57); Pervomaisk, Mykolaiv region, Ukraine
- Occupations: Social activist, economist
- Years active: From 1988
- Known for: "Ukraine without Kuchma", "Pora!" (black), "Vidsich"

Mykhaylo Bohdanovych Svystovych (Ukrainian: Михайло Богданович Свистович; born December 11, 1968) is a Ukrainian social activist and member of "Vidsich" civil movement, editor of "Maidan" magazine and economist.

== Biography ==
Mykhaylo Svystovych was born in Pervomaisk in Mykolaiv Oblast. Shortly after his birth the family moved to Mykolayiv. When he was studying in fourth grade of school, Mykhaylo read a book about Native Americans and became interested in indigenous people of America. At age 14, he concluded that fate of the Ukrainian people is very similar to the fate of Indians who were placed into reservations. Since then, Mykhaylo began to speak only Ukrainian language, despite the fact that the most people who surrounded him in Mykolayiv were speaking Russian.

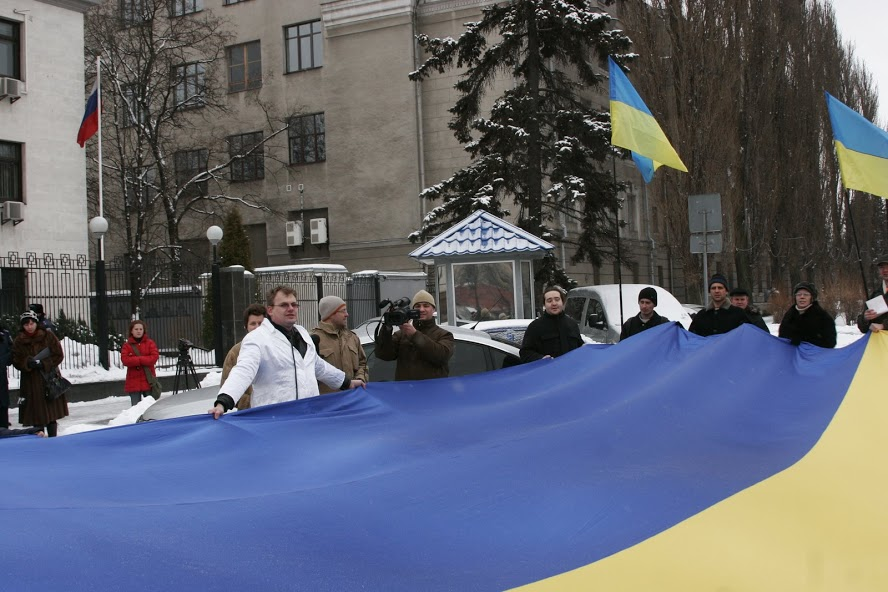
Mykhaylo Svystovych is taking part in "Remember about the Gas — Do not buy Russian goods!" campaign at January 17, 2009

After finishing school, Svystovych entered the Taras Shevchenko University of Kyiv on the faculty of economics.

In 1987 he joined the environmental protection squad called "Lenin Watch" (sector of fight against poaching), then — Taras Shevchenko Ukrainian language organization and also People's Movement of Ukraine.

He is one of the founders of the Ukrainian Students Union (USS) that conducted the student hunger strikes in 1990, member of "Revolution on Granite". During the "August Coup" he was organizing protests, later he joined the Ukrainian Republican Party, which was later renamed to the URP "Sobor".

1993 — worked in financial department of the state administration of Moscow district of Kyiv.

Since 1996 – worked as a deputy head of currency department of "Gradobank".

Since 1997 – worked as a head of currency operations Joint Stock Commercial Bank "Alliance".

In December 2000, after the death of his friend Georgiy Gongadze, he left his job at the bank and intensified his efforts in civic and community activities. He was one of the initiators of the movement "Ukraine without Kuchma" and was a member of the committee "For Truth!".

MykhayloSvystovych is one of the founders of the All-Ukrainian civil campaign "Pora!" (black). During its activity, shortly before the Orange Revolution he suffered persecution by the Ukrainian authorities. Security Service of Ukraine called him for interrogation and conducted searches in his apartment.

He was a member of the Public Council of The Ministry of Internal Affairs of Ukraine.

Since 2010, Mykhaylo Svystovychis activist of civic movement "Vidsich".

== Political activity ==
Has no affiliation with any political party; at the 2006 elections he was elected as a deputy of the Kyiv Oblast regional council as a part of the list of Yulia Tymoshenko Bloc.

== Private life ==
Mykhaylo Svystovych is married (second marriage) with Myroslava Svystovych; he has 3 children, two of them in his second marriage: his eldest son is Yaroslav, and his youngest daughter is Lada. Svystovych family is living in apartment in the Irpin city near Kyiv.

His wife, Myroslava, was Irpin Mayor in 2006–2007.
