= Liliya Hrynevych =

Ukrainian educator and politician

Liliia Hrynevych
- Лілія Гриневич
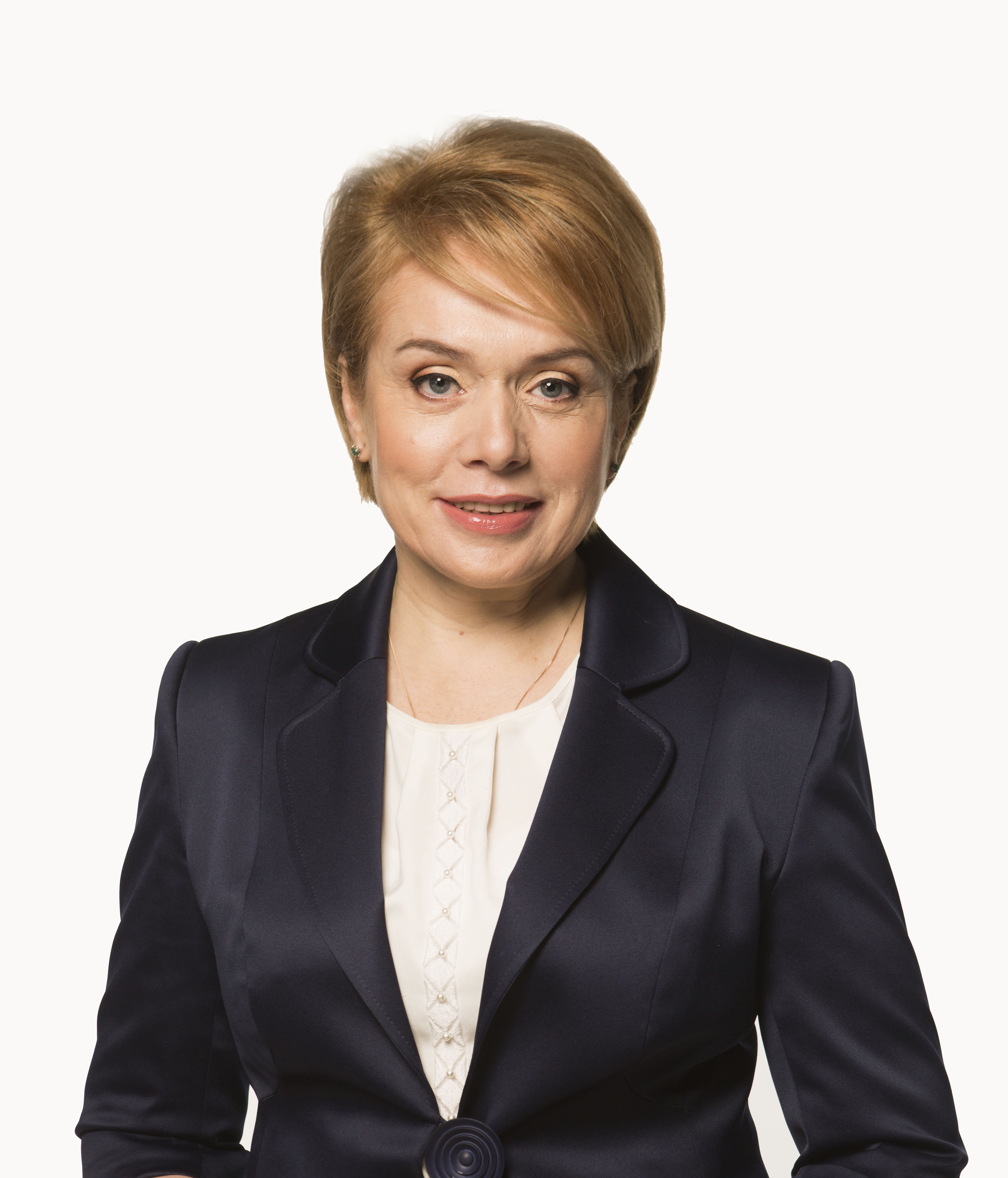

Minister of Education and Science
- In office 14 April 2016 – 29 August 2019
- Prime Minister: Volodymyr Groysman
- Deputy: Maksym Strikha
- Preceded by: Serhiy Kvit
- Succeeded by: Hanna Novosad

People's Deputy of Ukraine

7th convocation
- In office December 12, 2012 – November 27, 2014
- Constituency: Independent, No.14

8th convocation
- In office November 27, 2014 – December 2, 2014
- Constituency: People's Front, No.9

Personal details
- Born: 13 May 1965 (age 61) Lviv, Ukrainian SSR, Soviet Union
- Party: People's Front
- Education: Lviv University
- Awards: Order of Princess Olga, Badge of the Ministry of Education and Science of Ukraine "Excellence in Education"
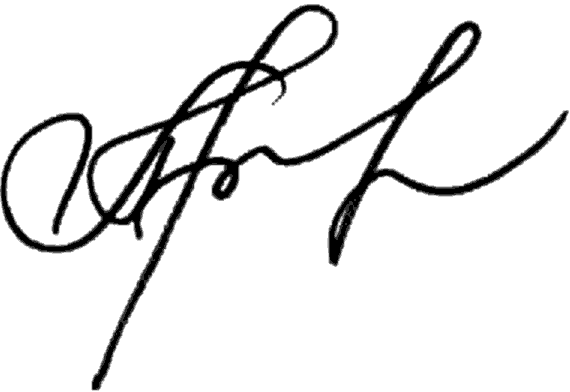
- Signature

Liliia Mykhailivna Hrynevych (Ukrainian: Лілія Михайлівна Гриневич, born 13 May 1965) is a Ukrainian educator, politician and civil servant, a Member of the Parliaments of the 7th and 8th Convocation from December 2012 to April 2016. From April 2016 to August 2019 —the Minister of Education and Science of Ukraine; the first woman-Minister of Education and Science in the period of the Ukrainian independence. She has a PhD in education.

From 2006 to 2009, Hrynevych headed the Kyiv City State Administration's education department. Representing Fatherland, she was elected to the 7 convocation of Verkhovna Rada during the 2012 Ukrainian parliamentary election. Placing 9th on the party list of People's Front, she was re-elected in the 2014 parliamentary election.She served as the chair of the Parliamentary Committee for Science and Education for two terms (7 and 8 convocations of Verkhovna Rada).

For many years, 1987 to 2002, she worked in secondary education in Ukraine as a teacher, deputy headmistress and headmistress in a number of Lviv schools. She was one of the founders of the Ukrainian Centre for Educational Quality Assessment, of which she was the Director from February to August 2006, focusing her efforts on the development of External Independent Assessment at a national level. Her political career began with the political party "Front for Change", as an advisor to party leader Arseniy Yatsenyuk on education. In 2012 she was elected as an MP to the Ukrainian Parliament leading the Parliamentary Committee for Science and Education, of which she was the Head until 2016. She has been awarded a Commander of the Order of Princess Olha degree, and has been awarded an "Excellence in Education of Ukraine" medal. She is an Honorary Senator of the Ukrainian Catholic University.

== Life story ==
=== Early years ===
Born into a family of teachers, Liliia was 17 years old when she entered Ivan Franko State University of Lviv.She graduated from university in 1987 with the qualification “Biochemist. Lecturer”. Liliia Hrynevych worked as a laboratory assistant from August to November 1987 in the Department of Biochemistry. Later she worked for some time as a tutor during the day in Lviv school No. 70, until in 1988 she was transferred to Lviv school No. 7 as a biology teacher, where she worked in this capacity until 1992.

Career in Education

In 1992 after the independence of Ukraine, Liliia Hrynevych worked in Lviv at school No. 7, where she was transferred from her role as a biology teacher to that of deputy Headmistress in national education. Liliia was awarded another degree in 1993 with the qualification “Economist-manager” from the Interdisciplinary Institute for professional training and development at Lviv Polytechnic State University. Liliia researched problems in reforming education systems at internship programs in Warsaw University and Columbia University. In 1994 she moved to Lviv specialized school No. 53, where she worked as deputy director for educational work, while undertaking an intensive course in the study of English. After four years she was transferred to another specialized school in the same city, No. 28, to take on the role of Headmistress, while undertaking an intensive course in the study of German. In this role, the future Minister worked until 2002. In 2002 Liliia Hrynevych relocated to Kyiv, where she worked at the Krok City Institute of Economics and Law as a senior lecturer in the Department of Management. At the same time, Liliia took on a part-time role as Director of the Renaissance International Fund Centre for Technology in Testing. She participated in the creation of the Ukrainian Centre for Educational Quality Assessment, which she headed during February to August 2006. During her work at the centre, Liliia Hrynevych was deeply involved in the development of External Independent Testing of pupils and applicants to higher education. The result was the introduction of External Independent Testing (EIT) at a nationwide level. In 2005 Liliia Hrynevych presented the thesis on "Trends in Decentralization of Basic Education Management in Modern Poland" and obtained PhD in Pedagogy, specialty 13.00.01 – General Pedagogy and History of Pedagogy.

- During 2006-2009 worked as Head of the Department of Education and Science at Kyiv City State Administration. * 2008-2012 – Lecturer at the Institute of Leadership in Educational Legislation and Policy at Borys Grinchenko Kyiv University, Senior Researcher at the Institute of Pedagogical and Adult Education of the National Academy of Educational Sciences of Ukraine.
- 2012-2016 – Member of Parliament of Ukraine of VII-VIII convocations, Chairman of the Committee on Science and Education.
- 2016-2019 Minister of Education and Science of Ukraine.
- Since November 2019-July 2024 – Vice-Rector for Academic and International Affairs of Borys Grinchenko Kyiv University.
- Since August 2024-till now – Vice-Rector for Academic Affairs of V.N.Karazin Kharkiv National University.

== MP activity ==
7th convocation of Parliament

At the time of the Parliamentary Elections in 2012 she was studying as a doctoral student at the Institute of Teacher Education and Adult Education of the National Academy of Pedagogical Science of Ukraine. In autumn 2012, following the elections to the Verkhovna Rada (Ukrainian Parliament), Liliia Mikhaylivna Hrynevych was elected an MP of Ukraine to the 7th convocation as No. 14 in the list of the United All-Ukrainian “Batkivshchina” (Fatherland) Party.

In December of that year, after election to Parliament, she Headed the Committee on Science and Education. After her appointment to this position Liliia Hrynevych defined the key tasks in this role as: ensuring fair and equitable access to higher education, increased access to education and improvements in its quality. In particular, improving legislation on these matters. At that time a new version of the law on higher education in Ukraine was being drafted. On 15 June 2013, after the amalgamation of the Front for Change and Batkivshchina parties, she became one of the deputy leaders of the new Batkivshchina Party. That same year Liliia joined several newly created parliamentary groups and associations. In particular, parliamentary groups on interparliamentary relations with countries such as Israel, Italy, Canada, South Korea, Poland, Russia, Singapore, the United States, Turkey, Hungary, and Finland.

In 2013 the creation of a Parliamentary Commission for Future Affairs was proposed. The task before this committee, as it was seen, should have been in helping MPs to consider issues related to forecasts and future plans, identify priority areas for technological innovation and innovative development of the nation, process models for future development, and to analyse various government programs.During this convocation of the Parliament of Ukraine, on 22 April 2015, a temporary Commission of the Parliament of Ukraine of the issues of the Future was created. 228 MPs were in favour of this Regulation No. 2219 on the second reading. Liliia Hrynevych was on the commission.

8th Convocation of Parliament'

During the early parliamentary elections in 2014, Liliia Hrynevych was elected to Parliament on the lists of "Government Party in Power" and "People's Front", headed at that time by Arseniy Yatsenyuk. Liliia Hrynevych ran on a multi-mandate platform, and was ranked ninth in the list of the party[8]. In the 8th convocation Parliament (Verkhovna Rada of Ukraine), Liliia Hrynevych continued working as a Chair of the Parliament Committee on Science and Education on developing legislative initiatives that enabled reforms in the national system of education including the academic research field. Liliia Hrynevych co-chaired an Equal Opportunities inter-factional union created in the 8th convocation Parliament in December 2014. Liliia H. was a co-author of the Draft Law on Amendments to Legal Acts of Ukraine, in particular, a gender equality legislative initiative on equal rights and opportunities for women and men in the election process. On 14 April 2016, the Verkhovna Rada Parliament of Ukraine appointed a new Cabinet of Ministers of Ukraine, which included Liliia Hrynevych designated as Minister of Education and Science of Ukraine.

Hrynevych took part in the July 2019 Ukrainian parliamentary election with the party Ukrainian Strategy. But in the election this party did get not enough votes to clear the 5% election threshold and thus won no parliamentary seats.

=== Legislative contributions ===
Liliia Hrynevych has initiated three fundamental reforms in the education and social-humanitarian spheres: the External Independent Testing, the new Law of Ukraine "On Higher Education", aimed at reforming the national tertiary education and "New Ukrainian School" – a reform of the general secondary education defined by the Law of Ukraine "On education". Implementation of External Independent Testing has led to equal access to education for everyone as well as a reduction in corruption in education in Ukraine. The Higher Education Law of Ukraine in 2014 established many innovations in higher education in Ukraine. In particular, this autonomy of universities, increased roles for student unions, changes in educational levels and academic degrees according to international practice, a new classification of universities, and new financing higher education.

The main developers of higher education reform in Ukraine in general and the Higher Education law have been, in addition to Liliia Hrynevych as the Chairman of Parliamentary Committee of Ukraine on Science and Education considered to be key include the former Minister of Education and Science of Ukraine, Serhiy Kvit, and the developer of the first draft of the new law, Member of the National Academy of Science of Ukraine and Rector of Kyiv Polytechnic Institute, Mykhailo Zghurovskyi. Liliia Hrynevych initiated changes to the science management system, enshrined in the Law on Scientific and Technical Activities, which was supported by 235 parliamentarians in November 2015. The Law, in particular, defines legal, administrative and financial foundations for developments in the Scientific and Technical sphere. The Law also establishes the National Council for Science and Technology Development and the National Research Fund. The drafting and adoption of the Law on Education made it possible to launch 'The New Ukrainian School', the reform of general secondary education. It was under the chairmanship of Liliia Hrynevych, that the draft Committee prepared the Draft Law on Education and sent it to the Parliament for re-reading in 2016. In 2017 the document was finalized and adopted in the second reading. Among other achievements - the adoption of amendments to the Budget Code, and changes related to the organization of inclusive education.

During her tenure during the 7th convocation, Liliia Hrynevych introduced 110 Bills and resolutions, 14 of which have entered into force, and submitted 23 parliamentary inquiries. The total includes 261 amendments to Bills, of which 244 have been adopted. During her tenure during the 8th convocation Liliia Hrynevych has introduced 82 bills and resolutions, 37 of which have entered into force, and submitted 10 parliamentary inquiries. The total included 52 amendments to Bills of which 34 have been adopted.

== Activity as Minister of Education and Science of Ukraine (April 2016 – August 2019) ==
Development of the education system was a priority of Volodymyr Groysman's government. Over the three years of Liliia Hrynevych's work in the Government, the consolidated budget for education increased from UAH 129.4 billion to UAH 246 billion. Particular attention was paid to rising the salaries in the education sector. From 2016 to 2019, teacher salaries increased by over 80%. In pre-school education, the priority was to eliminate the waiting lists for enrolment to kindergartens. Co-operation with local authorities made it possible to shorten the waiting lists from 96,000 seats in 2016 to 33,600 in 2019.

Liliia Hrynevych led "The New Ukrainian School" (NUS) - a large-scale reform in general secondary education. Liliia Hrynevych was a co-author of the New Ukrainian School Concept, which defined the principles and objectives of the reform.

In December 2016, the Government approved the Policy Proposal to reform the general secondary education. The reform aimed at transition from a "knowledge only school" to a "school of competencies", that is the ability to use the obtained knowledge to solve practical problems and form value-based relationships.

Minister Liliia Hrynevych suggested implementing the NUS reform in three directions: updating the education content; targeted teacher training; updating the educational environment (purchase of mobile desks, new equipment and training materials).

The preparation and implementation of the reform began in 2017 with 100 schools in Ukraine starting to pilot the new programs. The State Standard for Primary Education was approved In February 2018, and in September that year, all first-graders in the country began the school year in the updated learning environment with the teachers using modern teaching methods according to the new State Standard.

Within the framework of the reform, nearly 50,000 elementary school teachers, more than 11,000 Principals and Deputy Heads of educational institutions took the online and face-to-face in-service training course in blended mode.

In 2018, a voluntary teacher certification was introduced aiming to identify teachers with a high professional level, innovative teaching methods and ability to share their experience. The certified teachers are paid a 20% bonus. The pilot certification started in 2019.

The Government subsidized the refurbishment of schools and renovation of the educational environment. The state investments in school infrastructure in 2017 amounted to UAH 1 009.5 mln, in 2018 - UAH 2 509 mln, and in 2019 – UAH 3 886.3 mln.

The funds were allocated to the priority areas such as elementary school classroom transformation, equipment for the science and mathematics classrooms, the Ukrainian language classrooms in minority language schools, school sports complexes, equipment for the computer classes and the Internet access.

The learning conditions for the students in rural areas was a special concern for the Ministry. To improve these, a hub school network was created in May 2019. 785 hub schools and 1,272 hub school branches were established to build up the network in Ukraine. The hub schools and their branches were assigned a priority of establishing modern science, mathematics and computer classes, and transportation of the children from remote villages by school buses.

The Coordination Council was established to promote collaboration between the local executive and self-governing bodies and ensure a more effective co-operation between the regional state administrations, local communities and other agencies in the course of the NUS implementation.

Liliia Hrynevychformed an ecosystem of organizations with shared concepts of the reform ideas on the partnership pedagogy, lifelong learning, competency-based and learner-centered approaches to learning and teaching, etc. A number of non-governmental organizations, including EdCamp Ukraine, EdEra, Ukrainian Step by Step Foundation (USSF), Osvitoria, Smart Osvita, BatkiSOS and others, joined this ecosystem.

To implement the reform, Minister Liliia Hrynevych build up cooperative relationships with international partners. In particular, the large-scale Finnish-Ukrainian project "Learning together" attracted €6 million to assist the implementation of the NUS reform priorities.

The Memorandum signed between the Ministry of Education and Science and the LEGO Foundation, made it possible to provide every Ukrainian first-grader and every class with free Lego kits to support introduction of the game – and activity-based learning into the educational process.

An important area of the Ministry of Education and Science activity was development of inclusive education carried out in cooperation with Maryna Poroshenko, the Head of the Poroshenko Charitable Foundation. Between 2016 and 2018, the number of children with special educational needs who enrolled in secondary schools increased from 2 720 to 12 000. Inclusive Resource Centers were set up to assist parents and teachers in creating an individual development program for each child with special educational needs.

As Minister, Liliia Hrynevych launched an active anti-bullying campaign. The campaign found its support in the Law passed by the Parliament. The Law provides for counteracting bullying and introduces administrative penalties for bullying during the educational process. Additionally, the new Law on Education introduces the Institute of Educational Ombudsmen to ensure the students', educators', and scholars' rights.

The Law on Education adopted in September 2017 laid down the main provisions of the educational reform. The adoption of the Law was followed by an extensive discussions of Article 7, which specifies the state language in the education system. The state leaders of Romania and Hungary claimed the language article of the Law restricted the rights of the national minorities in Ukraine.

Ukraine addressed the European Commission for Democracy through Law (Venice Commission) and asked for its Opinion. In December 2017, when the Venice Commission was considering the legitimacy of Article 7, Liliia Hrynevychprovided convincing arguments and successfully defended the article "Language of Education". In July 2019, the Constitutional Court of Ukraine recognized the constitutionality of the Law on Education.

Pursuant to the Law on Education, the State Service for Education Quality (SSEQ)was established in 2017, which is responsible for upholding the state education standards and ensuring the proper education quality under the decentralized conditions. The basic principle of its activity is to assist educational institutions, management, teachers in improving the quality of their activities as well as the quality of the student learning outcomes.

Modernization of vocational education became an important priority of the Ministry's activities under the guidance of Liliia Hrynevych. The implementation of the investment program in 2016-2018 made it possible to create 100 training and practical centers for the most acute professions, where students can learn to work with modern materials, equipment and technologies.

The Agreement on financing the EU4Skills Project: Best Skills for Modern Ukraine was signed between Ukraine and the European Commission In 2018. The project attracted EUR 58 million in total and aims to create a network of Professional Excellence Centers, including purchase of new equipment, professional development of masters and teachers, development of new curricula and standards for students.

During her time in office, Minister Liliia Hrynevychmodernised the system of admission to higher education institutions. The admission is based on external independent testing (ZNO) results and the entire procedure is carried out online on the principle 'an offer goes to the best candidate'. A mandatory standard entrance exam is introduced as secondary admission criteria for the Law and International Law courses. The National Agency for Higher Education Quality Assurance, was established. Higher education competency based standards were developed for 266 specialisms.

Minister Liliia Hrynevychpaid special attention to the research development at university. For the first time the government funded a program aimed to create centers for collective use of research equipment at higher education institutions. Establishment of eight centers at Ukrainian universities was funded by the state budget in 2018. In 2019, university research received its first basic funding.

Liliia Hrynevychinitiated transformation of the scientific research management and financing system. In 2017–2018, the budgetary funding of science and research managed by the Ministry increased by 69%. The National Council for Science and TechnologyDevelopment began its work which made impact on the policy-making in the area.

The Ukrainian National Research Foundation was launched to be at the forefront of the new funding system, in particular in provision of research grants.

In 2017, the Ministry of Education and Science first financed the access of the Ukrainian universities and research institutions to Scopus and the Web of Science. In 2019 these scientometric bases were available for all state budgeted universities and scientific institutions at the state budget costs.

Starting in 2018, the Antarctic research at "Akademik Vernadsky", a Ukrainian polar station, intensified. The National Antarctic Scientific Center headed by Evgen Dykyi, a marine ecology researcher and Ukrainian activist, renewed its full membership in the Scientific Committee on Antarctic Research, modernized the station, provided high-quality Internet and communication; Ukrainian women joined the expedition for the first time in 20 years on the mainland.

The National Qualification Agency, a collegial body for implementation of the state qualification policy, was established to ensure development of the National Qualification System and compliance of the learning outcomes with the relevant education levels, qualifications and the modern market requirements.

== Personal life ==
As described by Liliia herself, she met her future husband Mykhaylo during their student years, when Liliia was involved in student activities. In particular, she sang in the 'Cheremosh' student group.

She speaks English and Polish.

According to politrada.com, Liliia Hryevych is most closely associated with Arseniy Yatsenyuk.[36] .Liliia Hrynevych began her political career when she joined the "Front for Change" party, which for a short time had her on the Board of the party. She coordinated the direction of the "Knowledge Society" part of a project called "Government of Change" for this party, on behalf of party leader Arseniy Yatsenyuk, for whom she was the adviser on Education Affairs for "Front for Change".

== Awards and honours ==
- Badge "Excellence in Education of Ukraine";
- Badge "Excellence in Capital Education";
- Honorary Diploma of the Verkhovna Rada of Ukraine "For Merit to the Ukrainian people";
- Order of Princess Olga 3rd Class "for significant personal contribution to the development of national science, strengthening of scientific and technical potential of Ukraine, diligent work and high professionalism";
- Honorary Professor at Borys Grinchenko Kyiv University "for active civic position, personal contribution to the development of the University, creation of a holistic system of training and professional development of academic staff in Kyiv";
- Honorary Senator at the Ukrainian Catholic University.
