= Oksana Prodan =

Ukrainian politician

- Оксана Продан
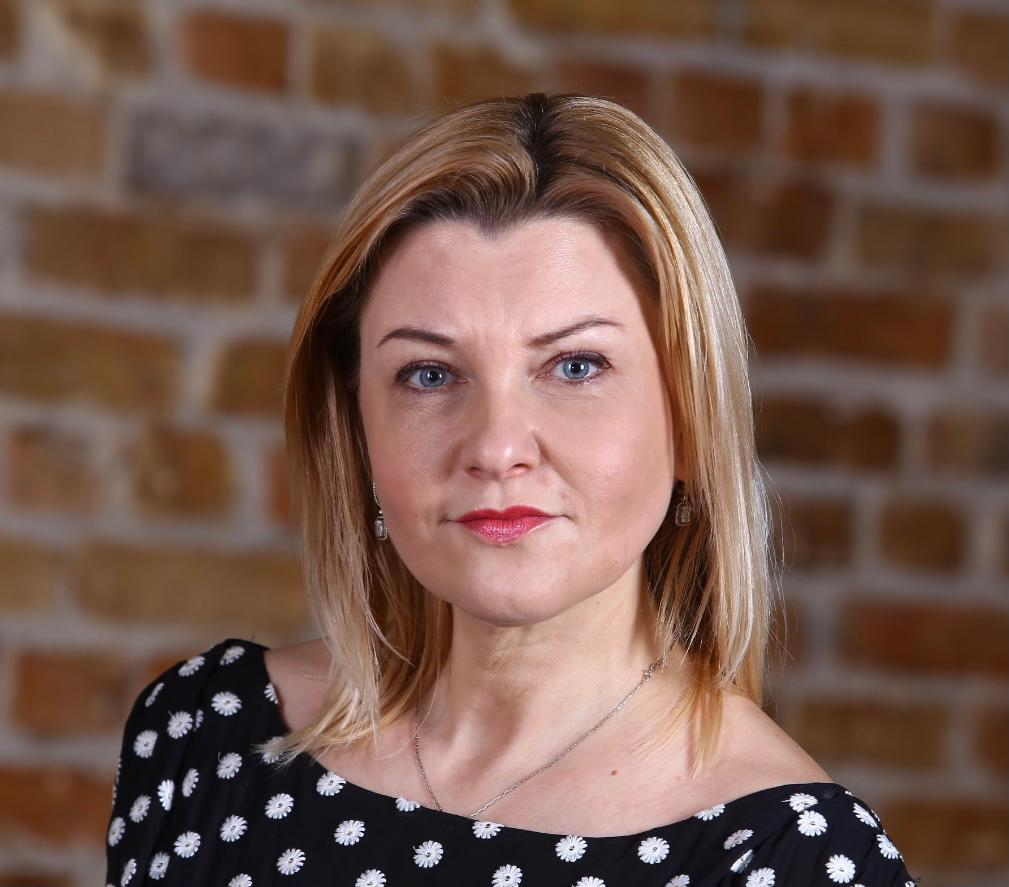
- Prodan in 2021

People's Deputy of Ukraine
- In office 12 December 2012 – 29 August 2019
- Constituency: UDAR, No. 4 (2012–2014); Petro Poroshenko Bloc, No. 15 (2014–2019)

Personal details
- Born: 16 April 1974 (age 52) Chernivtsi, Ukrainian SSR, Soviet Union
- Education: Chernivtsi University

Oksana Petrivna Prodan (Ukrainian: Окса́на Петрі́вна Про́дан; née Polishchuk; born 16 April 1974) is a Ukrainian politician who served as a People's Deputy of Ukraine from 2012 to 2019, first as a member of the Ukrainian Democratic Alliance for Reform and then as a member of the Petro Poroshenko Bloc. During the presidency of Viktor Yanukovych, she was one of the leaders of the 2010 Tax Maidan protests against the Tax Code of Ukraine.

== Early life and career ==
Her father is Petro Polishchuk, Honored Transport Worker of Ukraine, an entrepreneur in the field of passenger transportation, co-founder of Ukrtrans-Chernivtsi.

In 1996 Prodan obtained a degree in International Economics at Chernivtsi State University. In 2000 she graduated from the Institute of Statistics, Accounting and Auditing majoring in "Audit" and receiving the "A" auditor certificate. In 2002 she gained a degree in Law at Chernivtsi University.

She started her career in the real economy sector as an economist at Ukrtrans-Chernivtsi Ltd. In 2003, she headed the company SP Trans. In 2004, she was appointed Deputy Director of Ukrtrans-Chernivtsi. She has been working as a lawyer since 2008.

Oksana Prodan is married with two daughters. Her husband Vasyl Prodan is a well-known businessman in Chernivtsi, a deputy of Chernivtsi City Council from the faction "Ridne Misto" who was elected secretary of Chernivtsi City Council in November 2017

== Social activity ==
Prodan has been a member of the Public Council at the State Customs Service of Ukraine since March 2005. From March 2005 to July 2005 she served as Secretary of the Council of Importers within the Government of Ukraine. From July 2005 to July 2006 she was Deputy Chair of the Council on Foreign Economic Activity within the Government of Ukraine.

From 2007 to 2012, Prodan was Judge of the Court of Arbitration of the Ukrainian Public Organization "Association of Experts in the Agricultural Sector "TreteyskaInitsiatyva (Arbitration Initiative)".

She served as Chairperson of the Council of Entrepreneurs under the Cabinet of Ministers of Ukraine from 11 June 2008 to 17 May 2010. During Prodan's leadership, the mechanism of formation of the council was changed. The Council began including not only representatives of Ukrainian associations but also representatives of public councils under central executive authorities and regional councils of entrepreneurs. During this period, the council focused its activity on deregulation issues, creating conditions for entrepreneurship, promoting the development of small and medium-sized businesses. In 2010, following the appointment of Prime Minister Mykola Azarov, the Government of Ukraine cancelled the election of the Chairperson of the Council of Entrepreneurs, relieving Prodan of her duties.

She was Chairwoman of the Committee for the Protection of Entrepreneurs under the opposition government from 27 May 2010 to December 2011.

After the Verkhovna Rada (Ukrainian parliament) passed the Tax Code proposed by the Cabinet, which destroyed the simplified taxation system, Prodan was one of the leaders of the Tax Maidan protests, and joined the National Coordination Council of Entrepreneurs of the Tax Maidan.

During the Tax Maidan, together with like-minded people and other organizers of the protest action, she created the Fortetsya Ukrainian Association for Small and Medium-Sized Business aiming to protect the interests of entrepreneurship and develop and implement effective economic policies in the country.

== Political activity ==
In the 2012 Ukrainian parliamentary election, Prodan ran for parliament as a party list candidate of the Ukrainian Democratic Alliance for Reform, led by Vitali Klychko. She was the fourth on the party's electoral list.

In the 7th Ukrainian Verkhovna Rada, Prodan became a member of the Committee on Tax and Customs Policy holding the position of first deputy. During her work in the Verkhovna Rada, Oksana Prodan authored and co-authored 44 bills and 525 amendments to the bills. The privileges of deputies were discontinued with her support, the utilization fee and excise tax for car customization were abolished, European food production rules were adopted, which protect villagers from officials, ensure product quality and create opportunities for export to the EU.

In the 2014 Ukrainian parliamentary election, Prodan was once again a successful candidate. Following the signing of the political agreement between UDAR and the Petro Poroshenko Bloc, Prodan was placed 15th on the latter party's list. In the Verkhovna Rada, she headed the deputy group "UDAR", which included 33 deputies of Ukraine of the 7th convocation.

Since 2015, Oksana Prodan has been the representative of the Chairperson of the Association of Ukrainian Cities Vitaly Klychko in the Verkhovna Rada of Ukraine.

In the 8th Ukrainian Verkhovna Rada, Prodan became a member of the Committee on Tax and Customs Policy where she continued to deal with the issues on legislative support for economic reforms. In addition, in the 8th Verkhovna Rada, Prodan headed the inter-factional deputy group "Bukovina". The accomplishments of "Bukovina" include the introduction of a customs experiment for road works, assistance in the allocation of ₴700 million to repair the roads of the Carpathian Euroregion and the establishment of an Austrian consulate in Chernivtsi. Oksana Prodan also became a co-chair of the inter-factional deputy group "For the Rights of Energy Consumers", which united 71 deputies in order to create competitive conditions in the energy markets. She was a member of parliamentary groups on inter-parliamentary relations with Israel, France, Georgia, USA, Romania, Moldova, and Bangladesh.

She participated in the competition for the position of Head of the State Fiscal Service of Ukraine. Despite the support of Prodan's candidacy by a considerable number of experts and public figures, Roman Nasirov was elected Head of the State Fiscal Service of Ukraine. The organization of the competition provoked many complaints, and Oksana Prodan herself accused Prime Minister Arseniy Yatsenyuk of unwillingness to change the existing corruption and punitive model of the SFS.

During her work in the 8th Verkhovna Rada, Prodan initiated 144 bills, of which 29 became law. In addition, she introduced 1,776 amendments to 115 bills, prepared 57 requests and more than 1,800 appeals. The public association OPORA added Oksana Prodan to the list of five most efficient People's Deputies by number of bills passed. The list of her achievements includes the protection of property rights through the adoption of the systemic Law on Anti-Raiding, simplification of export of goods and services of national producers, reduction of the SSC (single social contribution) rate, maintaining a simplified system of taxation, financing the repair of highways in Bukovina, the introduction of personal liability of fiscal service workers for taxpayers' damage, implementation of European e-commerce rules, preservation of non-profit status of the housing cooperatives and religious organizations.

The Ukrainian publication "Novoye Vremia" included Prodan in the top 100 most successful women in Ukraine. The magazine "Focus" included Oksana Prodan in the ranking of the 100 most influential women of Ukraine from 2013 to 2021.

=== Since leaving the Verkhovna Rada ===
In 2019, Prodan was an UDAR party leader.

Іn 2020, Prodan headed the election headquarters of Kyiv City Council candidate Vitali Klychko and the UDAR election headquarters in the next local elections, in which Klychko was elected mayor of Kyiv in the first round and the UDAR party scored 19.98%.

Since 2020, Prodan is a Municipal Advisor to Klychko in his capacity as Head of the Association of Ukrainian Cities.
