= Borys Grinchenko Kyiv Metropolitan University =

Public university in Kyiv, Ukraine

Coordinates: 50.5136°N 30.6581°E

- Київський столичний університет імені Бориса Грінченка
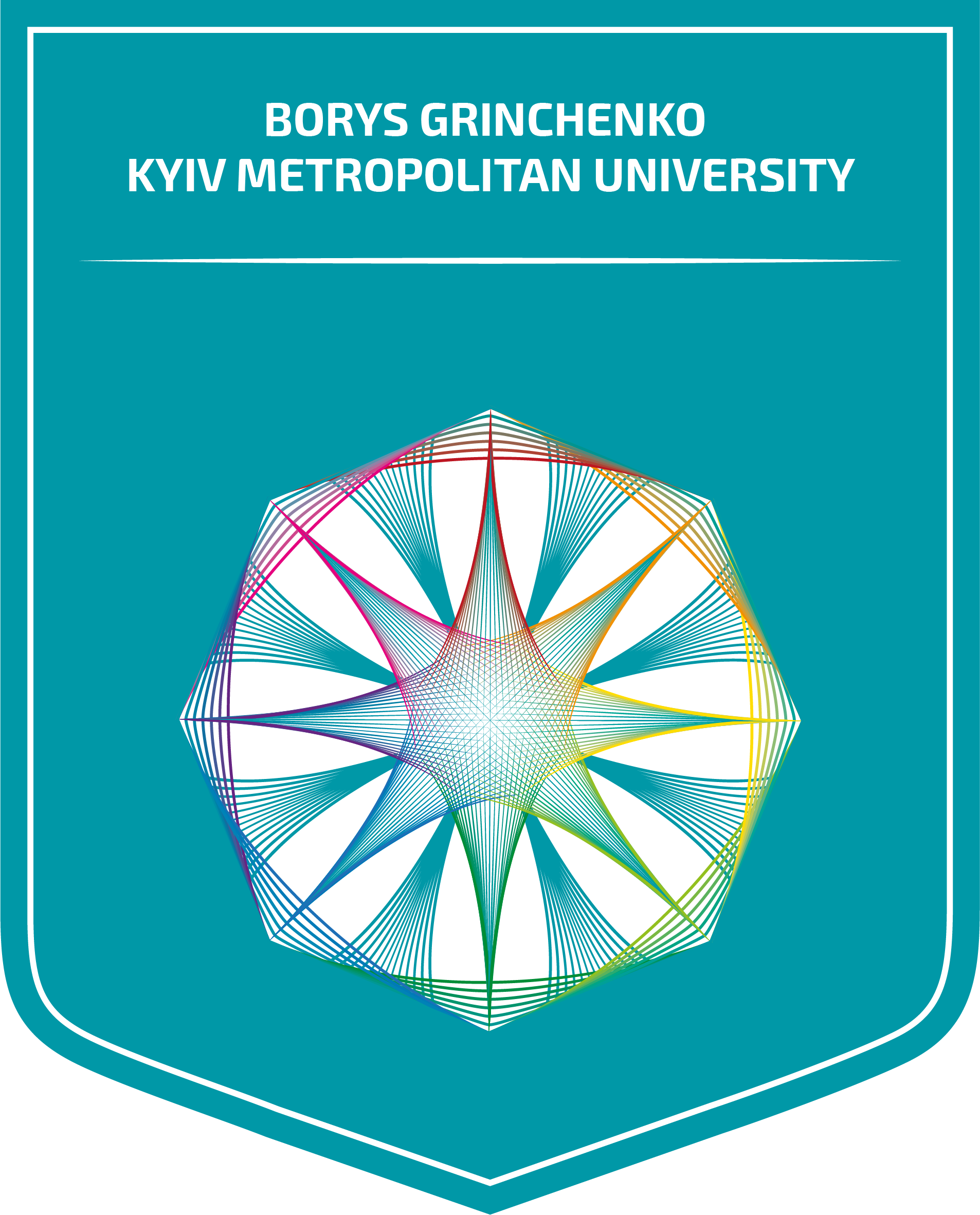
- University small coat of arms
- Motto: Прагнемо досконалості!
- Motto in English: Striving for excellence!
- Type: Public
- Established: 1903
- Rector: Victor Ogneviuk
- Location: 18/2 Bulvarno-Kudriavska Str, Kyiv, Ukraine, 04053, Kyiv, Ukraine
- Website: kubg.edu.ua

Borys Grinchenko Kyiv Metropolitan University (Ukrainian: Київський столичний університет імені Бориса Грінченка) is a higher education institution. The university was established by Kyiv municipal council through reorganization of Kyiv regional Teachers Training Institute named after Borys Hrinchenko. The university is communal property.

According to the decision of Kyiv municipal council of 8 October 2009 Kyiv Municipal Pedagogical University named after Borys Grinchenko was renamed Borys Grinchenko Kyiv University and its status changed. The university was transformed from a pedagogical profile to a multi-profile classic educational institution. This enabled it to expand its activities and have more majors, ensuring full satisfaction of educational requirements of Kyiv dwellers, meeting the needs of Kyiv and its region. In implementing these tasks the university's activity is aimed at achieving high standards and becoming a European-level institution.

Since January 1, 2024, Borys Grinchenko Kyiv University has officially added the word "metropolitan" to its name and changed its logo. The university received its new name due to the merger of two institutions. On June 23, 2022, Borys Grinchenko Kyiv University and Kyiv Academy of Arts were united into a single institution under the new name Borys Grinchenko Kyiv Metropolitan University.

The university consists of 13 faculties and one university college with more than 9,000 students. There are 35 operating departments. The scientific-pedagogical staff includes 49 PhDs, 184 EdSs, and 434 teachers. The university offers 55 masters and 49 bachelor level programmes. Each year around 7000 teachers and school principals enhance their skills and gain qualifications at the university. The university gives PhD training.

== Structure ==
=== There are 13 faculties at the institution of higher education ===
- Faculty of Economics and Management
- Faculty of Journalism
- Faculty of Health, Physical Education and Sports
- Faculty of Information Technologies and Mathematics
- Faculty of Musical Art and Choreography
- Faculty of Fine Arts and Design
- Faculty of Pedagogical Education
- Faculty of Law and International Relations
- Faculty of Psychology, Social Work and Special Education
- Faculty of Romance and Germanic Philology
- Faculty of Social Sciences and Humanities
- Faculty of Oriental Languages
- Faculty of Ukrainian Philology, Culture and Art

=== The university also comprises ===
- Institute of In-Service Training
- Applied College “Universum”
- Doctoral School
- “New Generation” Distance School

== University management ==
- Victor Ogneviuk (1959-2022) — rector, Doctor of Philosophy, professor, the full member of the National Academy of Educational Sciences of Ukraine;
- Nataliya Vinnikova – Doctor of Philology, Professor – Vice-Rector for Research;
- Oleksiy Zhiltsov – Candidate of Pedagogical Sciences, Professor – Vice-Rector for Scientific-Methodical and Educational Work;
- Oleksandr Turuntsev – Vice-Rector for Organizational, Administrative and Economic Work;
- Natalia Morze – Doctor of Pedagogical Sciences, professor, Academician of the Academy of Sciences of the Higher School of Ukraine since 2010, Corresponding Member of the National Academy of Pedagogical Sciences of Ukraine since 2010 – Vice-Rector for Informatization of Educational, Scientific and Administrative Activities (until 2019);
- Olena Bondareva – Ukrainian scientist, writer, Doctor of Philology, professor, Member of the National Writers' Union of Ukraine, the National Theater Actors' Union of Ukraine – Vice-Rector for Scientific and Methodological Work and Leadership Development (until 2020);
- Lilia Hrynevych — Ukrainian educator, politician and civil servant, People's Deputy of Ukraine of the 7th and 8th convocations, Minister of Education and Science of Ukraine in the government of Volodymyr Groysman. Member of the People's Front political party. Candidate of Sciences — Vice-Rector for Scientific and Pedagogical and International Activities (from 5 November 2019);
- Kostyantyn Batsak — Vice-Rector for Scientific and Methodological, Social and Humanitarian Work and Leadership (since 2020).
- Volodymyr Ohryzko — Vice-Rector for International Relations (since 2022)
- Leonid Yemets — Vice-Rector for Scientific and Methodological work, Relations with State Authorities and Local Government.

== History ==
- The university history began in 1874 with the establishment of Pedagogical courses for teacher training in Kyiv.
- In 1919 Borys Grinchenko Pedagogical Institute began operating, to be later reorganized into Kyiv Pedagogical Courses named after Borys Hrinchenko. These courses assimilated a few other similar pedagogical courses, which led to the foundation of Kyiv Teacher Training Institute in 1939.
- In 1993 Kyiv Teacher Training Institute was given the name of Borys Hrinchenko. It was providing in-service training for teachers of Kyiv schools.
- In 2002 it was reorganized into Kyiv Municipal Pedagogical University named after Borys Hrinchenko, and it started offering degrees in teaching.
- In 2007 a new era began in the university's development. A new rector, Viktor Ogneviuk, has made a commitment to transform the university, making it a modern, dynamic and European-oriented educational institution. On 8 October 2008, the university was renamed into Borys Grinchenko Kyiv University, becoming a classical university and having offer different majors, not only teacher training. This has allowed to enrol more students and increase diversity.
- September 2008 – University Academic Council developed and approved the Concept of University Development for 2008–2012.
- 1 January 2008 – Institute of Psychology and Social Pedagogy, Humanitarian Institute, Institute of Pre-School, Elementary and Art Education, university college were established and included into the university structure
- 20 May 2008 – a new university building opened its doors for the University academics and students.
- 1 September 2008 – Institute of Leadership, Education Legislation and Politics started its work in the structure of the university.
- 2008–2009 academic years – ten specialties (majors) got the highest (IVth) accreditation level
- 8 October 2009 – Kyiv Municipal Pedagogical University named after B.D. Grinchenko was renamed into Borys Grinchenko Kyiv University.
- 2010 – Six institutes (Humanitarian, Pedagogic, Arts, Leadership and Social Sciences, Psychology and Social Pedagogy, In-Service Training) and a University College, as well as scientific and methodological centres and research laboratories have been functioning.
- 2010 – Borys Grinchenko Museum was opened.
- June 2010 – university obtained the highest (IVth) accreditation level
- 1 September 2010 – number of students is six thousand. University trains specialists in 7 Junior Specialists programs, 12 Bachelor programs, 11 Master's programs.
- September 2010 – Viktor Ogneviuk, the rector, signed the University Magna Charta in Bologna, Italy
- 2010–2011 – University started the social project "With Kyiv and for Kyiv"
- 22 August 2011 – a monument to Borys Grinchenko was opened for the charitable contributions of academics, students and education employees with the support of Kyiv.City Council
- 14–17 June 2011 in Malmo, Sweden, the General Assembly of European Association for the Education of Adults (EAEA) approved the application form of Borys Grinchenko Kyiv University as an Associate Member of EAEA.
- 26 June 2012 – University held the seventh place in the official ranking of Ukrainian classic universities.
- 28 August 2012 – University Academic Council renamed the Institute of Leadership and Social Sciences into the Institute of Society
- 1 September 2012 – number of University students is more than 7 thousand. University trains specialists in 12 Junior Specialist programs, 34 Bachelor programs, 18 Master's programs and 18 PhD programs.
- 1 October 2012 – Center of Practical Students Training was opened for the students specialized in Elementary Education and Pre-School Education headed by Tamara Proshkuratova, the Hero of Ukraine, Honorable teacher with a 25-year teaching history.
- 15 November 2012 – Viktor Ogneviuk was re-elected for the second term as the Rector of Borys Grinchenko Kyiv University.
- 19 November 2012 – University became the member of the International Association of the Universities.
- 25 January 2013 — the last EUA Council has approved Borys Grinchenko Kyiv University application for an individual associate membership in Istanbul.
- 27 October 2016 at the meeting of the Academic Council of the University was signed the Declaration of Academic Integrity and the Declaration of Compliance with the Code of Corporate Culture of the University.
- 2017 — the university switched to the New Education Strategy.
- 2018 — the university football team won bronze at the European Student Games in Coimbra (Portugal).

== Education and research base ==
In December 2007, two reading rooms for students, graduates and teachers were opened. The funds of the university library increased significantly (360 thousand copies). New major steps were made in the fields of information studies: information computer center was launched, as well as four computer labs and laboratory of innovative technologies studies.

Each year on 9 December the university celebrates Borys Grinchenko's birthday, and this is the Day of the University.

Actual science issues of university activity are discussed by the Academic Board of the university, as well as by student scientific society.

To improve the professional skills of the faculty scientific-methodological seminar regularly operates.

The collection of scientific works Teacher Education: Theory and Practice. Psychology. Pedagogy is being published by the university since 2001. It is included into the list of scientific professional publications by the State Accreditation Commission of Ukraine.

Scientific research work is carried out in a spirit of cooperation and fruitful contacts with the National Academy of Pedagogical Science of Ukraine and its research institutions. A respective cooperation agreement was signed in 2007.

In 2007 postgraduate major 13.00.04 Theory and Methods of Professional Education permanently opened.

The Student Scientific Society works at the university. The magazine of the student’s research papers Scientific studies of the Grinchenko students has been published since 2007; the best scientific works of future teachers are published there.

The university is a signatory of the Magna Charta Universitatum; a member of the International University Association; and the European Association for the Education of Adults.

Grinchenko University cooperating with educational institutions of Belarus, Bulgaria, China, Finland, France, Israel, Germany, Greece, Italy, Kazakhstan, Latvia, Lithuania, Paraguay, Poland, Portugal, Slovakia, Spain, Switzerland, Turkey, USA.

The university is a member of international projects supported by the European Commission: Seventh Framework Programme on "International Research Network for study and development of new tools and methods for advanced pedagogical science in the field of ICT instruments, e-learning and intercultural competences (IRNet)"; TEMPUS on the themes: "Development of Embedded System Courses with implementation of Innovative Virtual approaches for integration of Research, Education and Production in Ukraine, Georgia, Armenia (DESIRE)"; "Education for Leadership, Intelligence, and Talent Encouraging (ELITE)".

The university has its original image and is an integral part of Kyiv city education.

Borys Grinchenko Kyiv University has a structure that includes:

- general departments of educational, scientific and methodical nature (centers, laboratories);
- general departments of administrative character (departments, accounting);
- library;
- 1 institute;
- 13 faculties;
- 1 college.

The distributed campus structure includes

- Administrative building (at 18/2 Bulvarno-Kudriavska street);
- Academic buildings (at 17 Tychyny ave., 13b L. Lukyanenka str., 16 Kadeniuk ave., 18 /2 I. Shamo blvd., )
- Dormitories (2 Starosilska str., 18 /2 I. Shamo blvd.)

== International cooperation ==
The university is a signatory to the Magna Charta Universitatum; member of the International Association of Universities, the European Association of Universities, the European Association of Adult Education.

The university cooperates with educational institutions in the US, Belarus, Bulgaria, China, France, Israel, Germany, Italy, Kazakhstan, Latvia, Lithuania, Poland, Portugal, Slovakia, Spain, Switzerland, Turkey, Greece, Cyprus, Paraguay, and the Czech Republic.

Borys Grinchenko Kyiv University interacts with the World Bank, the British Council, the USETI Alliance. The university is a participant in international projects supported by the European Commission: the Seventh Framework Program on "International Research Network for the Study and Development of New Technologies and Methods for Innovative Pedagogy in ICT, e-Learning and Intercultural Competences (IRNet)", TEMPUS program on the topics: "Development of a system of embedded courses through innovative virtual approaches for the integration of research, education and production in Ukraine, Georgia, Armenia (Desire)", "Education for leadership, intelligence and talent (ELITE)".

== See also ==
- Open access in Ukraine
