= PORA (Russian youth group) =

Russian political organization

PORA (Russian: ПОРА!), meaning IT'S TIME! in Ukrainian and Russian, is a Russian civic youth organization that mirrors the Ukrainian civic youth organization of the same name.

The organization was created in December 2004 in order to harness the experience of successful democratic revolutions in Serbia (overthrow of Slobodan Milošević), Georgia (Rose Revolution), and Ukraine (Orange Revolution). At a March 2005 press conference Kyiv (Ukraine), the leaders announced their intention to back former Prime Minister Mikhail Kasyanov in the 2008 Russian presidential elections as Russia's version of (Orange Revolution winner) Viktor Yushchenko. Kasyanov had, they admitted at this press conference, still to be approached on this question. The organization held its press conference in Kyiv "because opposition forces cannot operate openly in Russia". Group leaders admit in March 2005 to having contacts with Boris Berezovsky because they share "similar views about the state of affairs in our country [Russia]". In April 2005 the organization was headed by Andrei Sidelnikov. By then the group held press conferences in Russia. In December 2007 Sidelnikov (at the time leader of PORA) applied for political asylum in the United Kingdom because he was "very afraid about my life in Russia". Sidelnikov had been arrested in Russia on arrival in Moscow before a The Other Russia rally on 15 April 2007. In July 2008 Sidelnikov was granted political asylum by Britain.
