= External independent evaluation =

Examinations for admission to universities in Ukraine

Ukrainian Center for Educational Quality Assessment

External independent evaluation or External independent testing (EIT, external testing, ET) is a set of complex organizational procedures (mainly testing) aimed to determine the level of academic performance of secondary schools during their graduates' admission to higher education in Ukraine. The purpose of EIE is improving public education and implementation of Ukraine's constitutional rights to equal access to quality education, monitoring of compliance with the State Standard of secondary education and the analysis of the education system, as well as predicting its development. The results of external testing results are counted as results of both the State's Final Attestation and entrance examinations to higher educational institutions. EIE is carried out by the Ukrainian Center for Educational Quality Assessment in partnership with local education authorities, the Regional Institute of Postgraduate Education, and educational institutions.

Some tests can be conducted in a minority language: Polish, Hungarian, Russian, "Moldovan"/Romanian or Crimean Tatar.

== History ==
Subject		2004	2005	2006	2007	2008	2009	2010	2011	2012	2013	2014	2015	2016	2017	2018	2019	2020	2021
Ukrainian language																			
Ukrainian literature																			
History of Ukraine																			
Mathematics																			
Physics																			
Chemistry																			
Biology																			
Geography																			
Foreign language	English, German, French or Spanish																		
Foreign language	Russian																		
World Literature																			
World History																			
Economics																			
Law																			
Notes — was not conducted; — conducted selectively; — for all university entrants

=== 1993 ===
Ukraine has made an attempt to introduce testing of secondary schools. Due to a number of factors, such an attempt failed.

=== 2002 ===
Center for Testing Technology International "Renaissance" in cooperation with the Ministry of Education and Science of Ukraine conducted 200 tests, which was attended by first-year students in higher education. The purpose of this project - test and development of technology management.

=== 2003 ===
Center for Testing Technology International "Renaissance" in cooperation with the Ministry of Education have tested in mathematics and history 3121 670 graduate schools of Ukraine. Four universities have started to count the test results as preliminary tests. At the request of students in secondary schools test results rank as a state final certification.

=== 2004 ===
Center for Testing Technologies International "Renaissance" in cooperation with the Ministry of Education tested 4485 high school graduates bridge Kyiv, Donetsk, Lviv, Kharkiv, Odessa of math, Ukrainian language, history, economy.

The 31 higher educational institutions were decisions on admission test results as preliminary tests.

25 August adopted Resolution Ukraine Cabinet of Ministers "Some aspects of the introduction of external assessment and monitoring of the quality of education." This document provides: held in 2006, the testing technology EIT educational achievements of graduates of general secondary education, in 2007 – 2008 years - make the introduction of UPE educational achievements of graduates who wish to join Universities.

=== 2005 ===
President Viktor Yushchenko decree on July 4 instructed Ministry of Education and Science of Ukraine for 2005 – 2006 years to make the transition to conduct preliminary tests to higher education institutions by EIT.

Cabinet of Ministers of Ukraine in law No. 1312 on December 31 was established Ukrainian Center for Educational Quality Assessment and found that UPE schools dosyahen graduates of general secondary education, who found bazhannnya join Universities is a state final certification and introductory trial to these institutions.

Being tested 10,030 students from 1567 schools in Ukraine.

=== 2006 ===
In the State Budget of Ukraine | State Budget of Ukraine in 2006, the first provided the funds for implementation of UPE and monitoring the quality of education.

Begins its activity Ukrainian Center for Educational Quality Assessment. Created 8 regional centers otsnyuvannya quality education.

Being tested 41,818 secondary school graduates, which involved 6 300 instructors, 700 examiners.

=== 2007 ===
After 2005, all university, subordinated to the Ministry of Education and Science of Ukraine rank the results of external testing.

2007 external testing was performed as the test with Ukrainian language, math, History (History of Ukraine and World History).

External independent evaluation Chemistry, biology, Physics was carried out only for school leavers Kharkiv district.

Testing of the Ukrainian language took place on 21 April, chemistry, physics and biology - April 26, math and history - April 28.

=== 2008 ===
Since 2008, external independent evaluation is a prerequisite of entry to higher education. 2008 independent external evaluation is carried out with such items:

- Ukrainian language and literature;
- History of Ukraine (from ancient times to the present);
- World History (from ancient times to the present );
- Foreign Literature;
- Chemistry;
- Physics;
- Biology;
- Mathematics;
- Economic fundamentals;
- Basics of jurisprudence;
- Geography.

After the arrival of the new Minister of Education and Science Ivan Vakarchuk appropriate order number from the 1171 25 December 2008 was determined Ukrainian language as a single, which can make the external evaluation, and those who studied minority languages (Russian, Polish, Hungarian, Crimean, "Moldovan"/Romanian) will be given a short vocabulary of terms translated into Ukrainian. This caused outrage and concern among minority groups, including Russian and Hungarian Ukraine. In the Crimea there were mass protests for the right to make tests online. This position was supported by some officials of Ukraine, Chairman of the Supreme Council of Crimea Anatoliy Hrytsenko sent a written request to the Ministry of Education of Ukraine to Crimea testing was conducted online.

In general, under the substantive session of the external evaluation, which lasted from April 22 to June 4 was written 997 000 897 tests. To test participants working 4600 test points, which housed 81,000 audiences. The average turnout for testing was 76%.

=== 2009 ===
1 November 2008 university announced for EIT certificate required for admission to certain areas of training. Drawing substantive session SET cut in two weeks, so it went on May 6 to 5 June 2009, you can register with 1 December 2008 year. In addition, that year was reduced to eight the number of items from which the testing was conducted in foreign literature, basic economy, basic law, world history was excluded. Instead, graduates were able to pass the tests in foreign Language English, German, Spanish or French. Graduates could choose not to lease 3 and up to five items EIT. Testing of the Ukrainian language and literature continue left compulsory for all graduates. Starting this year, the submission of applications to the university can be monitored online vstup.info. Also in 2009, the possibility remains up tests six languages national minorities of Ukraine. Preparation courses at universities no longer allow non-competition entrance in university.

=== 2010 ===
This year, ending several years of transition period during which the test could pass one of seven languages. A decree to improve instruction in Ukrainian national minorities in schools, so EIT for the first time held merely Ukrainian. To ensure the rights of national minorities will be provided dictionary and the translation of key terms that will be used in the tests. However, Crimean parliament are June 18, 2008, the turned to Supreme Soviet and Cabinet of Ministers with a request to conduct an independent external testing Crimea school graduates enrolled in languages of national minorities in these languages also after 2009 year. However, the decision of the Ministry remains unchanged. The main testing session will be held in June (2 to 23). Graduated Every school should be tested in the Ukrainian language and literature, and the choice of math or history.

- 2, 3, 4 June: Ukrainian language and literature
- June 7: Foreign Language
- June 9: Biology
- 11 June: Geography
- 14, 15 June: Mathematics
- 17, 18 June: History of Ukraine
- 21 June: Chemistry
- 23 June: Physics

=== 2011 ===
In 2011, an external evaluation for those wishing to become university students conducted the following subjects: Ukrainian language and literature, history of Ukraine, mathematics, biology, geography, physics, chemistry, Russian language, one foreign language (optional): English, German, French, Spanish.

The external evaluation of the Ukrainian language and literature is required for all applicants.

The results of the external assessment will be counted as entrance examinations to higher educational institutions for education and professional training programs vocational and Bachelor (and Master of Medical and Veterinary Medical direction) .

Tests for external assessment of Ukraine's history, mathematics, biology, geography, physics, chemistry will be translated in Crimean Tatar, Polish, Russian, "Moldovan"/Romanian, Hungarian.
November 10, 2011 began a registration trial testing EIT, which lasted until 10 December 2011 inclusive.

- 2 and 3 June: Ukrainian language and literature;
- June 6: foreign languages (English, German, French, Spanish);
- 8 June: Mathematics;
- 10 June: Russian;
- 14 June: Biology;
- 16 June: History of Ukraine;
- 20 June: Physics;
- 22 June: geography;
- June 24: chemistry.

=== 2012 ===
In 2012, in the subjects, which carries EIT added world history. In addition, the maximum number of items that sit on EIT applicants dropped to four. No other significant changes have occurred, remains binding assembly assessment of applicants Ukrainian language and literature. Other items depend on the chosen specialty. It should also be noted that due to the conduct of Euro 2012 in Poland and Ukraine SET 2012 held about a month before usual.

- 15 May: Chemistry;
- 17 May: Russian;
- 19 May: geography;
- May 21: May 22: Mathematics;
- 24 May: World History;
- 26 May: foreign languages (English, German, French, Spanish);
- May 28, May 29: Ukrainian language and literature;
- May 31, June 1: History of Ukraine;
- June 5: Physics;
- 7 June: Biology.
- 4–11 July: makeup session EIT.

=== 2013 ===
August 13, 2012 it was announced that the list of items for compiling external evaluation to be completed world literature.

- 3 June: Chemical
- 5, 6 June: Ukrainian language and literature;
- June 8: foreign languages (English, German, French, Spanish);
- 10 June: Russian;
- 12, 13 June: Mathematics;
- 15 June: geography;
- 17 June: World History;
- 19, 20 June: History of Ukraine;
- 22 June: Physics;
- 25 June: Biology;
- 27 June: World Literature.
- 4–11 July: makeup session EIT.

=== 2014 ===
- 3 June: foreign languages (English, German, French, Spanish);
- 5, 6 June: Ukrainian language and literature;
- 10 June: Russian;
- 12 June: Mathematics;
- 14 June: geography;
- 16 June: Biology;
- 18 June: Physics;
- 20 June: History of Ukraine;
- 23 June: Chemistry;
- 25 June: World History;
- 27 June: World Literature.
- 4–11 July: makeup session EIT.

=== 2022 ===
Due to Russia's full-scale invasion of Ukraine, a bachelor's degree entrance test was introduced in 2022 in the form of the National Multisubject Test (NMT).

The test took place in June 2022 in the form of online testing in three subjects (Ukrainian language, mathematics, and history of Ukraine).

== Weaknesses ==
- Despite the obligatory identification with a government ID, this protection was ineffective in preventing impersonation during examination. For example, in 2008, a student from the University of Lviv agreed to take the Ukrainian language and literature test for a different student in one of Dnipro's schools for a fee;
- Annual changes to the rules of admission to universities;
- Possible presence of errors in the tests themselves that potentially leads to students losing points. This is remediated by the appealing mechanism;
- Possible interference of the Head of Ukrainian Center for Educational Quality Assessment in determining the results of the examination.
- External independent evaluation is not held in some administrative units which forces some students to travel long distances in order to take the test.

== Benefits ==
- Equal access to education for all, regardless of financial means;
- Objectivity: tests are checked by examiners with no connection to the testees. Some subjectivity may arise when evaluating responses to questions with open answers;
- Lowering local corruption risks;
- Stricter adherence to the European standards.

== See also ==
- State final certification (SFC)
- Unified entrance exam (UEE)
- Unified professional entrance exam (UPEE)
- Unified state qualification exam (USQE)
