= PORA =

Community and political organization in Ukraine

- Пора!
- Formation: 2004; 22 years ago
- Type: Civic youth organization and political party
- Headquarters: Kyiv, Ukraine
- Region served: Ukraine
- Members: 10,000 (2004)
- Formerly called: Oberih

Pora! (Ukrainian: Пора!), meaning "It's time!" in Ukrainian, is a civic youth organization (Black Pora!) and political party in Ukraine (Yellow Pora!) espousing nonviolent resistance and advocating increased national democracy. The group was established in 2004 (as only a civic youth organization) to coordinate young people's opposition to the Kuchma government in opposition to what they claimed was the authoritarian governing style of Ukraine's president Leonid Kuchma. International and U.S. government involvement in its seed funding is contested. After the Orange Revolution Pora! split up in two different entities, Black Pora! (since 2006 OPORA) and Yellow Pora!

== The civic youth organization ==
Pora! was inspired and partly trained by members of the Serbian Otpor movement which helped bring down President Slobodan Milošević, and is also allied to related movements throughout Eastern Europe, including Kmara in the republic of Georgia (itself partly responsible for the downfall of President Eduard Shevardnadze), Zubr in Belarus (opposing President Alexander Lukashenko), Oborona in Russia, and MJAFT! in Albania.

According to Pora! it has never received U.S. funding and that while 18 members traveled to Serbia in the spring of 2004 and met with Otpor leaders at a seminar in the city of Novi Sad, they paid for the trip themselves. This stands in contrast to claims that the National Endowment for Democracy, Open Society Initiative, and the Citizens’ Role in Elections in Ukraine programme, run by Freedom House, NDI and the International Republican Institute (funded by USAID), provided some support for the youth organisation, mostly as seed money. Freedom House also provided indirect assistance to Yellow Pora and the Freedom of Choice coalition by sponsoring and helping to organize a summer camp for activists.

Prior to the 2004 presidential election, pro-democracy movements such as Pora! had created political networks throughout Ukraine, including 150 groups responsible for spreading information and coordinating election monitoring, 72 regional centers, and 30,000 registered participants. This allowed Pora! to mobilize protesters after widespread reports of electoral fraud.

Pora! supported Viktor Yushchenko in protests following the disputed 2004 presidential election. It claimed to have about 10,000 members. Its methods have apparently been influenced by Gene Sharp's manual From Dictatorship to Democracy. Apart from the mass demonstrations of the "Orange Revolution", the group's tactics have included the use of visually striking posters showing confrontational images such as a giant boot crushing a cockroach, and stickers with "revolutionary" slogans such as "Time to Arise!". Not surprisingly, this has aroused the ire of the Ukrainian authorities and Pora! activists have often been harassed and arrested. Pora! activists were arrested in October 2004, but the release of many (on what was reported President Leonid Kuchma's personal order) gave growing confidence to the opposition. Pora! was seen as being on the radical wing of the reform movement.

== The split ==
After the success of the Orange Revolution in defeating election fraud, from early 2005 Pora formally split into two branches with different goals for the future. The difference, however, always existed without being publicly known, between the original Black Pora! - a student movement associated with civic resistance and anti-Kuchma campaigns and the Yellow Pora! – organized by a group of politicians more closely connected to oppositional parties in the Parliament – such as Nasha Ukraina (Our Ukraine) of Viktor Yuschenko and PRP (Reforms and Order Party).

Yellow Pora stated in January 2005 it focused on spreading its "revolution" to other countries, particularly Belarus and Russia. A Russian wing of Yellow PORA was created in December 2004 in order to harness the experience of successful democratic revolutions in Serbia, Georgia, and Ukraine (pora.org.ru).

=== The political party ===
Yellow Pora! is a Ukrainian political party registered on March 23, 2005. Yellow Pora was united with Party Reform and Order and founded bloc PRP-PORA for the parliamentary elections 2006. Vitali Klitschko was the head of this political bloc. At the parliamentary elections on 26 March 2006, this alliance won 1,47% of the popular vote and no seats. The alliance was disbanded after the election when the parties became members of different electoral alliances.

In the parliamentary elections on 30 September 2007, the party was part of the Our Ukraine–People's Self-Defense Bloc alliance, which won 72 out of 450 seats.

In the 2010 local elections the party biggest achievement was winning 3 seats in the Lviv City Council.

The party did not participate in the 2012 parliamentary elections. And again did not participate in the 2014 Ukrainian parliamentary election.

In December 2022 the party was renamed "Oberih" (Ukrainian: Оберіг).

=== OPORA ===
Black Pora, now called OPORA, functions mainly as a pro-democracy watchdog trying to clean Ukraine of 'Kuchmism' (i.e. the legacy of the former authoritarian President Leonid Kuchma) and does not see the possibility of exporting its experience to other countries. Black Pora! remains a non-partisan movement and has formally registered as an NGO - All-Ukrainian Civic Organization Pora! Part of its public campaigns – such as the one aimed at pressuring major political parties to clean their electoral lists of notorious personalities – connected to the old regime or having criminal background. Around the March 2006 Parliamentary elections Black Pora changed its name to OPORA (Foundation) (Ukrainian: ОПОРА, Russian: ОПОРА).

== See also ==
- Vidsich
- Nonviolence
- Nonviolent Resistance
- Liberalism
- Contributions to liberal theory
- Liberalism worldwide
- List of liberal parties
- Liberal democracy
- Liberalism in Ukraine
- Liberal revolutionary movements in post-communist Eastern Europe
- 2006 Ukrainian parliamentary election
- Oborona
