= EdCamp Ukraine =

Participant-driven conference

- ЕдКемп Україна
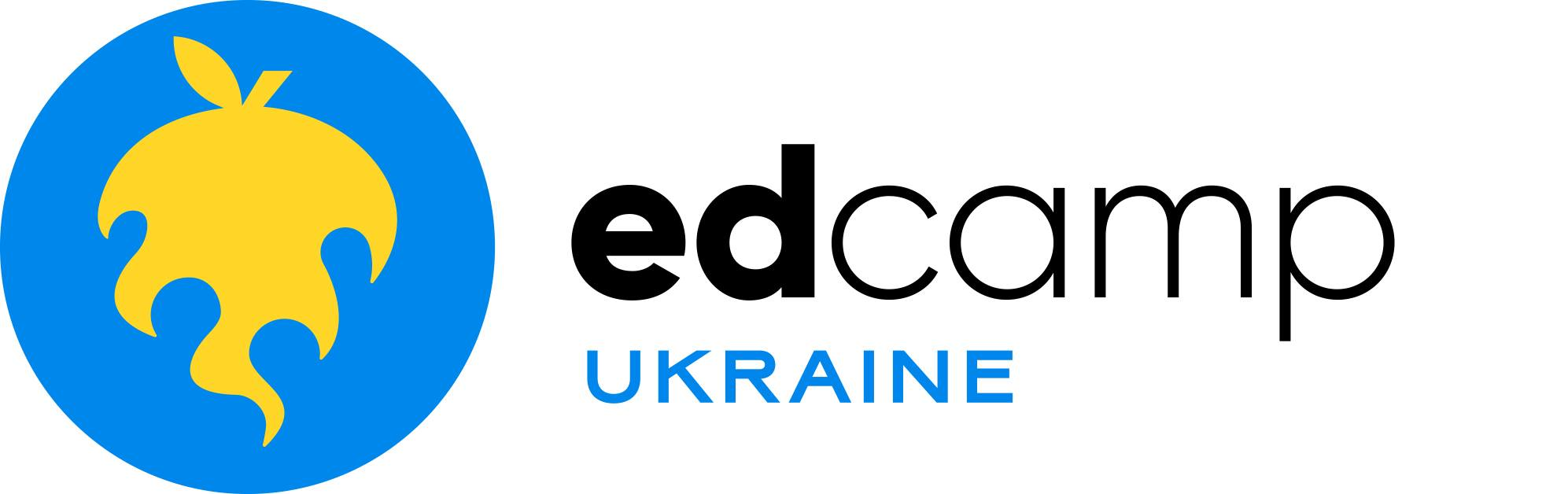

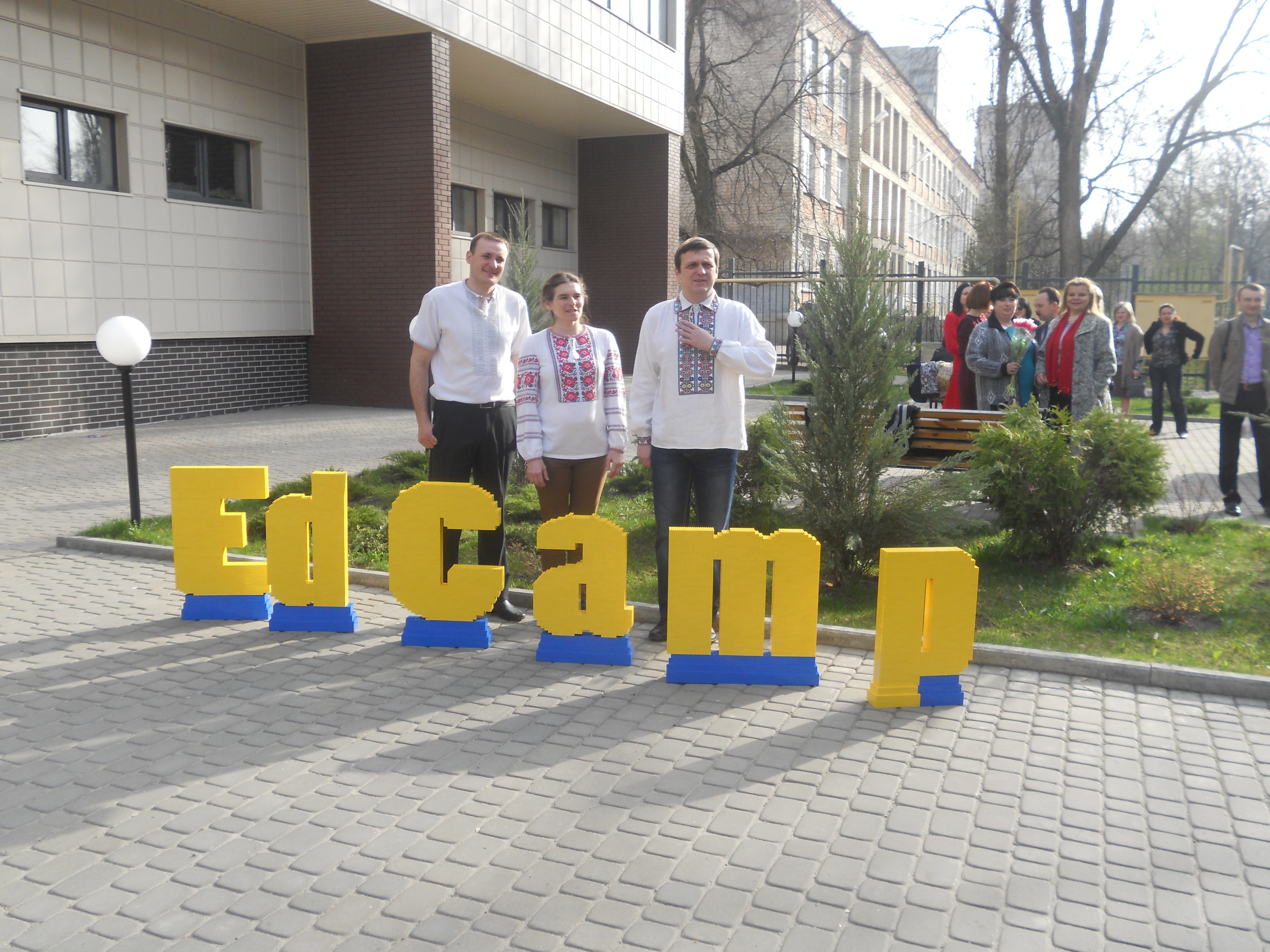
- Formation: December 29, 2015; 10 years ago
- Founder: Oleksandr Elkin
- Founded at: Kharkiv, Ukraine
- Type: Non-profit, non-governmental public organization
- Purpose: Enhancement of the Ukrainian educational system
- Location: Kharkiv, Ukraine
- Fields: Education
- Members: 34,000 (2020)
- Owner: Oleksanr Elkin
- President: Oleksanr Elkin
- Vice-President: Olena Massalitina
- Vice-President: Oleg Marushchenko
- Main organ: Board
- Parent organization: EdCamp
- Website: edcamp.ua

EdCamp Ukraine (Ukrainian: ЕдКемп Україна) is a movement of educators in Ukraine. It is based on the principles of the worldwide EdCamp movement, which originated in the United States. Ukraine was the third country in Europe and the ninth in the world to join the original movement in 2014. As of 2020, EdCamp Ukraine is the second biggest EdCamp community in the world, and the biggest community of educators in Ukraine.

The EdCamp Ukraine movement is supported by a non-governmental, non-profit public organization of the same name, which focuses on improving the Ukrainian education system. EdCamp Ukraine organizes career-enhancement training for teachers, lobbies the Ukrainian Ministry of Education and Science for educational reforms, and organizes various projects for educators and students.

EdCamp Ukraine's 2018 initiative concerning the development of professional education succeeded in reforming the career-enhancement training process, in particular by de-monopolizing the government-sponsored professional education enterprises. As the initiative's result, in 2019 the new regulations of the Ministry allowed educators to develop their professional skills through a wider range of educational and scientific institutions, as well as through private and legal business ventures. Their education is funded by government or local budgets according to the "money follows the teacher" principle.

The anti-discrimination expertise of EdCamp Ukraine became a part of the Ministry's textbook-approval procedure. EdCamp Ukraine's activity led to the establishment of the New Ukrainian School (Ukrainian: Нова Українська Школа) reform, and to a variety of anti-corruption and de-bureaucratization procedures. For example, in 2019, two independent sources estimated that the de-bureaucratization reforms EdCamp Ukraine lobbied for decreased teacher paperwork by 20 to 30%.

EdCamp Ukraine's signature events are unconferences: free and independent events that focus on communication between educators, international experts, speakers, and government figures. Since 2015, EdCamp Ukraine has organized six national and 186 regional in-person and online unconferences. In 2020, more than 10,000 members attended the Sixth National unconference, which became the biggest online event in Ukraine (as recorded in the Ukraine Record Book).

== History ==
=== The original movement ===
The original EdCamp movement was established in 2010, in Philadelphia, Pennsylvania, US. The movement was created as an alternative source of professional development for educators and in response to American educators' complaints about the inefficiencies of their educational system. As of 2020, 44 countries have joined the movement.

In 2019, 2020 and 2021, the EdCamp format was acknowledged by the HundrED organization in their worldwide review of innovative education organizations.

In 2020, EdCamp US merged with the Digital Promise organization, which develops innovations for education especially through incorporating technology.

=== EdCamp Ukraine ===
Based on the principals of the original EdCamp movement, EdCamp Ukraine is a movement of Ukrainian educators based around a non-governmental, non-profit public organization that focuses on the independent professional development of educators nationwide. It also works on education system reformation and improvement. Ukraine became the third country in Europe and the ninth in the world to join the original movement. The members of the organization are called "white crows," describing people who seize change in their community and are not afraid to try alternative techniques.

The EdCamp Ukraine organization was founded by Oleksandr Elkin, and as of 2020 he still serves as its Head of Board. Prior to the foundation of the organization, Elkin worked for an IT company and developed programs to improve the Ukrainian education system, such as the school management system School Champion, a platform that connects Ukrainian education institutions. The EdCamp Ukraine organization was inspired by the 2014 Revolution of Dignity in Ukraine.

The EdCamp Ukraine movement began in 2014, in Kharkiv, Ukraine. On December 29, 2015, the EdCamp Ukraine organization was officially registered as a non-profit public organization. In 2017, it launched a crowdfunding project to fund its first office, which was opened in Kharkiv in 2018. In 2019, the organization became the official owner of the EdCamp trade mark in Ukraine.

As of 2020, EdCamp Ukraine is the second biggest EdCamp community in the world and the biggest community of educators in the country, with a membership more than 40000. Of those, 21,802 work in Ukrainian schools, which is about 5% of all Ukrainian educators. According to research, the EdCamp movement is present in half of Ukrainian schools.

==== Unconferences ====
One of the key signature events of EdCamp Ukraine are the free unconferences held yearly in Kharkiv, Ukraine. Educators apply and participate in an oral interviewto be selected to attend.

Unconferences are "edutainment" (education/entertainment). Topics are shaped at the beginning of an event, and participants are the main authorities, meaning that every member of the unconference can become a speaker. This format makes it easier for educators to learn from each other, as its sessions are held a free discussion format.

Several main methods and principles of unconferences are:

- Free attendance
- Independence
- Freedom of initiative
- The "two legs" law, which implies that every member is free to build their own schedule within the event, attending any session or joining any discussion
- The "long tale effect," which means that the most important steps are not made during the discussions or unconferences, but afterwards, when real action towards improvement is taken
- The "speed-geeking" practice (a three-minute tête-à-tête conversation between members and speakers) to spur communication and make as many acquaintances as possible between members and experts at unconferences

== Arenas of action ==
=== Professional development for educators ===
Participation in EdCamp unconferences.

==== National unconferences ====
EdCamp Ukraine's National unconferences are considered the key event of the year for Ukrainian educators. The first EdCamp Ukraine unconference was held in June 2015, and attended by more than 350 visitors.

===== The Second National unconference =====
In April 2016, the second unconference was held in Kharkiv. The event was part of the 2016 Ukrainian Ministry of Education and Science and the Institute of Educational Modernization (Ukrainian: Інститут модернізації змісту освіти) events. It was held in partnership with more than 40 Ukrainian organizations and financed via crowdfunding at the Ukrainian platform Spilnokosht (Ukrainian: Спільнокошт). Between 500 and 550 people visited the unconference, including around 80 Ukrainian and international experts from 12 countries. The event consisted of 145 sessions in 17 different locations.

Main topics included new technology, an anti-discrimination approach in education, community integration, and English language as national priority. The concept of the New Ukrainian School (Ukrainian: Нова Українська Школа), a reform in Ukrainian education, was outlined and discussed. International speakers at the event were: Oskar Brenife, author and philosophy Ph.D. from Paris, France; Eva Rambala, lecturer and trainer in non-violent communication, from Budapest, Hungary; and Esther Wojcicki, journalism teacher and media arts program founder from Palo Alto, California, USA.

===== The Third National unconference =====
The third EdCamp Ukraine unconference was held in April 2017. Almost 700 educators participated, including people from 20 countries other than Ukraine. The Ukrainian Minister of Education and Science, Liliya Hrynevych, joined the event. There were 20 sessions in 20 locations and 135 speakers from 20 different countries. At this unconference, the Ukrainian version of the Global Teacher Prize was announced.

Main topics at this event included the formation of the New Ukrainian School (Ukrainian: Нова Українська Школа) and future reforms in the Ukrainian school system. British author, speaker, and international advisor on education Ken Robinson addressed the unconference in a 10-minute video message. European Organization for Nuclear Research (CERN) researcher Giovanni Porchellana spoke at the unconference.

===== The Fourth National unconference =====
The fourth EdCamp Ukraine unconference was held in Kharkiv in 2018. Participants totaled 946 educators from 24 Ukrainian regions, and 143 experts from 11 countries presented. One of the main topics of the unconference was anti-discrimination in education.

Six hundred EdCampers gathered at the Constitution Square in Kharkiv for a flash mob that was later registered in the Ukrainian Record Book as the biggest gathering of educators ever. Ukrainian and international public figures took part in the flash mob, including Liliya Hrynevych, the Minister of Education and Science; Hadley Ferguson, co-founder of the original EdCamp movement in the US; Caspar Peek, representative from United Nations Population Fund in Ukraine; and Yaacov Hecht, Israel educator and founder of democratic schools. Speakers included Yaacov Hecht, Liliya Hrynevych, and Esa Sinivuori, a Finnish expert from Lumo Education.

===== The Fifth National unconference =====
The fifth unconference was held in 2019 in Kharkiv. About 1,000 educators attended, including experts from 20 countries.

Anti-discrimination policies in education were widely discussed during the event. Another main focus introduced the concepts of Social Emotional Ethical Learning system (SEE Learning) to Ukrainian educators (SEE Learning is a system of the "soft skills" that include creative thinking, empathy, the ability to work in a team, and other skills previously introduced to EdCamp Ukraine team by the fourteenth Dalai Lama).) Plans were discussed to incorporate SEE Learning into Ukrainian schools.

The EdCamp Ukraine team invited the President of Ukraine, Volodymyr Zelenskyy, to join the unconference to discuss Ukrainian education and necessary reforms. Due to a scheduling conflict, the President couldn't attend, but addressed the EdCamp Ukraine team and members in a letter. The members were also addressed by the Dalai Lama in his video message.

During the unconference, another record was set: "The biggest number of locations to join an online educators' flash mob" registered Ukraine Record Book. Liliya Hrynevych, as well as several other Ukrainian public figures and international guests such as Giovanni Porchellana from the European Organization for Nuclear Research (CERN), and Israel educator Yaacov Hecht, took part in the flash mob.

===== The Sixth National unconference =====
Due to quarantine measures during the COVID-19 pandemic, EdCamp Ukraine's 2020 unconference was held online. Its theme was "High Five for Education." Oleksandr Elkin and EdCamp Ukraine 2020 were acknowledged in the "United States and Ukraine: Virtual EdCamps" issue of Education Continuity, published by the Organisation for Economic Co-operation and Development.

The main subject of the online marathon—education within the Coronavirus pandemic—was discussed by educators and parents from all over Ukraine. It was the first time parents were invited to attend the unconference. More than 10,000 members and 65 speakers from 22 countries joined the online event. People entered virtual unconference sessions 80,689 times. Lectures and sessions totaled 55 hours.

The five main subjects discussed at the event were distance learning, education policies, physical and mental health, financial and legal challenges, and partnership in education.

Due to new Ukrainian Ministry of Education and Science regulations, educators were able to receive a professional development certificate for attending. Many Ukrainian speakers from government and the entertainment industry attended the event and led their own sessions.

International speakers included Hadley Ferguson, co-founder of the original EdCamp movement in the US; Esther Wojcicki, journalism teacher and media arts program founder; Christa Tinari, senior SEE Learning program developer from Emory University; and others. The First Lady of Ukraine, Olena Zelenska, addressed educators and members via video. Ukrainian television hosts Maria Efrosinina and Slava Frolova attended the event. Experts included the Dalai Lama, a Nobel Prize winner; Yuval Noah Harari, historian, teacher, and bestselling author; Anthony Salcito, Microsoft vice-president in regard to education; Andreas Schleicher, developer of the Programme for International Student Assessment; Yaacov Hecht, Israel educator and founder of democratic schools; and others.

===== EdCamp Joy =====
In December 2021, was organized the seventh (non) conference - "National EdCamp for joy! -)" (alternative name EdCamp Joy). The (non) conference in the online format lasted 10 days, from December 7 to 18. The event was attended by 1,161 people - teachers of all levels of education, other adults who work with children and parents. The offline part was held in the format of a meeting of international delegations of the EdCamp movement from 18 to 22 December. Memoranda of cooperation were signed between the national movements of EdCamp in six countries (Belarus, Moldova, Georgia, Romania, Armenia), EdCamp Ukraine with the Small Academy of Sciences of Ukraine, and H.S. Skovoroda Kharkiv National Pedagogical University. The event was attended by 30 world-renowned scientists, educators, psychologists, thought leaders, whose research and practice relate to the phenomenon of joy. This is the world educational expert and developer of international PISA testing Andreas Schleicher (Germany), education specialist, documentary film producer, venture investor and writer Ted Dintersmith, psychologist, writer, founder of the teaching program at Williams College Susan Engel (USA) teacher Shalva Amonashvili (Georgia). There were also closed screenings of three films: "Most Likely to Succeed" (2015, USA), "Mission: Joy - Finding Happiness in Troubled Times" (2021, USA) and "Why am I alive" (Чому я живий, 2021, Ukraine).

==== Regional unconferences ====
After attending EdCamp Ukraine's unconferences, educators volunteer to hold regional unconferences, or mini-EdCamps, for their communities. These regional unconferences are held monthly in different Ukrainian education institutions. Between 2015 and 2020, there were 186 regional unconferences. In 2017, EdCamp Ukraine held around 40 regional unconferences in different Ukrainian cities, supported by the US Embassy and different Ukrainian companies.

In 2016, the EdCamp Ukraine team held a competition for educators to hold official mini-EdCamps in their cities, and received 25 applicants. From 2017 on, EdCamp Ukraine has provided support and financing to teachers who win the contest through their EdCamp in a Box program. Between 2015 and 2021, there were 234 regional unconferences. In 2021, EdCamp Ukraine held around 45 regional unconferences in different Ukrainian cities.

EdCamp Ukraine began developing EdCamp in a Box in 2016. In 2017, the organization established the project EdCamp in a Box 3.0. The project provides competition winners with necessary documentation, support, and funds to hold a regional unconference in different Ukrainian cities.

==== Other projects for educators ====
In 2018, the I National summit-challenge "EdCamp-Angels in Action" was held in Odesa, Ukraine, and was visited by 100 mini-EdCamps coordinators from across the country. During the summit, nine organizations joined the union to support New Ukrainian School (Ukrainian: Нова Українська Школа) reform.

In 2018, EdCamp Ukraine published a book, Improving with EdCamp: How to hold educational unconferences for your community, which illustrates EdCamp Ukraine's main principles and education methods as well as step-by-step advice for offering a mini-EdCamp in any city. The same year, the organization introduced their own online course, How to Organize EdCamp for Your Community.

Also in 2018, three training sessions organized by EdCamp Ukraine, the Ministry of Education and Science of Ukraine, the United Nations Population Fund, and other Ukrainian organizations were held to certify experts for their anti-discrimination project. Forty-seven members attended to increase their knowledge and skills.

In October 2021, the EdCamp Ukraine team presented a course titled Educators' Professional Development: New Regulations And Possibilities, on the Ukrainian online course platform Prometheus. EdCamp Ukraine also has its own educational podcast on YouTube and Mixcloud online platforms.

In March 2020, EdCamp partnered with the Ministry of Education and Science in Ukraine and other organizations to hold a national online professional development training session for 4,000 educators. That same year, an online meeting was held to discuss the reopening of educational institutions after the COVID-19 quarantine, as well as innovations in education with Ukrainian specialists and public figures such as Lilia Hrynevych.

Next, EdCamp Ukraine, with Ukrainian and Swedish partners, set up a contest among young educators from the Donetsk and Luhansk regions of Ukraine; 30 educators took part.

From November to December 2020, EdCamp Ukraine ran an EdCamp online marathon for educators to discuss, learn, and incorporate new teaching methods and practices during the worldwide epidemic of COVID-19 and the period of distance education.

=== Activities during full-scale Russian invasion in 2022 ===
Since February 24, 2022, EdCamp Ukraine has been implementing a number of anti-crisis initiatives to support educators, parents, children and youth during the war.

Open Space of Sustainability - open online meetings for all with specialists from the Institute of Trauma and Emory University.

EdCamp-academy for students, teachers and parents - a system of regular activities to support adults and children.

Thematic expert materials on sensitive topics - videos, infographics, cartoons with tips, explanations, lists on topics related to evacuation from hotspots, travel abroad, adaptation to new places, volunteering, etc.

Appeals of famous people to Ukrainians - supporting video or text appeals, "messages of hope", made by famous people, like Richard Branson, Esther Wojcicki, Andreas Schleicher, Edith Eger to Ukrainians.

=== Research and reforms in education ===
==== De-bureaucratization in schools ====
In 2016, EdCamp Ukraine and the Ministry of Education and Science of Ukraine took an anonymous poll of almost 8,000 educators in regard to paperwork. They used the research to introduce an initiative supporting de-bureaucratization in schools. In 2017, they published "Children and Paperwork: reaching balance in school" to report the results of the research, illustrating the issue from different angles and providing ideas for reforming school paperwork systems. Later in 2017, due to the anti-bureaucracy initiative, teachers were relieved of conducting the student census.

In 2018, the Ministry of Education and Science passed new regulations in regard to school documentation, decreasing the amount of paperwork in schools by 20% to 30%.

==== New Ukrainian School Reform ====
In 2016, the concept of the New Ukrainian School (Ukrainian: Нова Українська Школа) was outlined and discussed at the second EdCamp Ukraine unconference. This reform initiative became the main subject of discussions between Ukrainian educators and government through EdCamp Ukraine unconference 2017. That year, the Ministry of Education and Science of Ukraine released a document publishing the main concepts, aims, and reform stages for the New Ukrainian School. Oleksandr Elkin, the founder and head of EdCamp Ukraine with vice-president Olena Massalitina co-authored the New Ukrainian School Reform concept. The New Ukrainian School was the first Ukrainian educational reform movement to include soft skills (creativity, openness for communication and partnership, and conflict resolution) into school curriculum. Soon after, Ukrainian teachers started to integrate some of the concepts of the New Ukrainian School into the school system.

In 2018, the reform was officially introduced into schools. That year, during the summit challenge for regional coordinators of mini-EdCamps around Ukraine, nine Ukrainian organizations joined the union to support and lobby for further development of the New Ukrainian School.

In 2017, EdCamp Ukraine established the #книгоНУШ project, aimed at creating book clubs and compiling vital educational books as the foundation for the New Ukrainian School system. Ukrainian poet, novelist, essayist, and translator Serhiy Zhadan was one of the first activists to support and promote the initiative.

==== Anti-discrimination expertise ====
From 2016 on, EdCamp Ukraine partnered with the United Nations Population Fund and the Heinrich Böll Foundation in Ukraine to research discrimination in education and create anti-discrimination projects.

In 2017, EdCamp Ukraine, the Ministry of Education and Science of Ukraine, and the Institute of Education Content Modernization (Ukrainian: Інститут модернізації змісту освіти) established an anti-discrimination review of Ukrainian textbooks. Later that year, according to the initiative, textbooks for 1 and 10 grades were reviewed by the anti-discrimination expert commission for the first time in history.

From 2016 through 2020, EdCamp Ukraine holds anti-discrimination trainings for textbook authors and publishers. Starting in 2018, the organization also holds trainings and a summit to teach educators how to review textbooks according to anti-discrimination principles.

While at the beginning of the project, no textbooks fully met the anti-discrimination educational standards, by 2018, 22% of books met the new anti-discrimination regulations. In 2019, that rose to 42%.

As of 2020, anti-discrimination review officially became part of the textbook-approval procedure.

==== Professional education ====
In 2018, EdCamp Ukraine, with the Ministry of Education and Science of Ukraine, International Renaissance Foundation (IRF), and other Ukrainian organizations, did a research project called "To teach and to learn: how Ukrainian education can grow" in regard to educators' professional development. The project involved 8,427 educators, and 87% of them expressed the desire to develop professionally and learn the English language. At the time, 11% could speak English. EdCamp Ukraine and the Ministry of Education and Science started to work on an initiative to enable educators to officially develop their professional skills, not only through government-sponsored education but also through non-governmental organizations, business ventures, and with the help of other sponsors.

In 2019, the Ministry of Education and Science passed new regulations in regard to teacher's professional development. According to the new regulations, Ukrainian educators are to spend a minimum of 150 hours every five years developing their professional skills. The whole process is funded by government or local budgets, which is the essential rule of another newly established principle, "money follows the teacher." Educators can fulfill those hours through educational and scientific institutions or private and legal business ventures, and are free to choose among the institutions that provide such services.

The Ministry of Education and Science created a group to work on professional development topics which included EdCamp Ukraine founder and president Oleksandr Elkin and vice-president Olena Massalitina.

==== Anti-corruption initiative ====
Since 2018, EdCamp Ukraine has partnered with the USAID project "Support to Anti-Corruption Champion Institutions" (SACCI). Together with other Ukrainian ventures and organizations, they work to decrease corruption in Ukrainian schools. One result of the partnership was an anti-corruption educational toolkit for teachers to use in, teaching children how to fight corruptive practices. The toolkit contains games, quests, and ideas for training sessions. As of 2020, session on anti-corruption techniques became part of all annual EdCamp Ukraine unconferences.

==== EdWay ====
In 2021, the organization launched EdWay - the National platform for professional development opportunities for teachers, where educators are free to choose the subject, form, type and content of professional development.

==== Lessons of kindness ====
In 2021, EdCamp Ukraine together with #GenerousTuesdayChildren (#ЩедрийВівторокДіти) and a specially selected team of authors developed a manual for the formation of a culture of charity in the educational process: "Lessons of kindness: ideas and tips for the school year".

=== International projects and partnerships ===
Over the years, Ukrainian EdCampers have promoted their organization and its ideas in Armenia, Georgia, Belarus, and Moldova. They served as advisors for African and Italian EdCamps. The EdCamp Ukraine team has close relationships with educators in the US, Finland, Germany, Sweden, Israel, and Singapore.

==== Early events ====
From 2015 through 2020, EdCamp Ukraine supports and celebrates Global Dignity Day, and gives classes in regard to it in Ukraine. During the sixth annual Global Dignity Day celebration in 2020, the organization attracted Ukrainian schools to participate by holding lessons and discussions in online and offline formats. In September 2020, the president of EdCamp Ukraine, Oleksand Elkin, was appointed Global Dignity Country Chair for Ukraine. Since 2015, 2,789 educational institutions and 379,843 participants have joined the celebration of the Day of Dignity.

In 2017, the Ukrainian version of the Global Teacher Prize was announced and officially begun at the national unconference. Oleksandr Elkin served as a judge for the annual prize from 2017 to 2019.

In 2017, EdCamp Ukraine introduced a new branch of activity: international trips aimed at researching education in different countries, called EdTrips. Its first destinations were Finland and Estonia. Later, EdTrips visited Sweden.

In 2018, EdCamp, in partnership with Lumo Education, established another international project, Seven Days of Change. In this program, the EdCamp Ukraine team invited Finnish educators to visit a Ukrainian school and share Finnish educational concepts with Ukrainian staff. Out of 675 applicants, a school in Poltava Oblast won the chance to host Finnish colleagues.

==== SEE Learning and partnership with Dalai Lama XIV ====
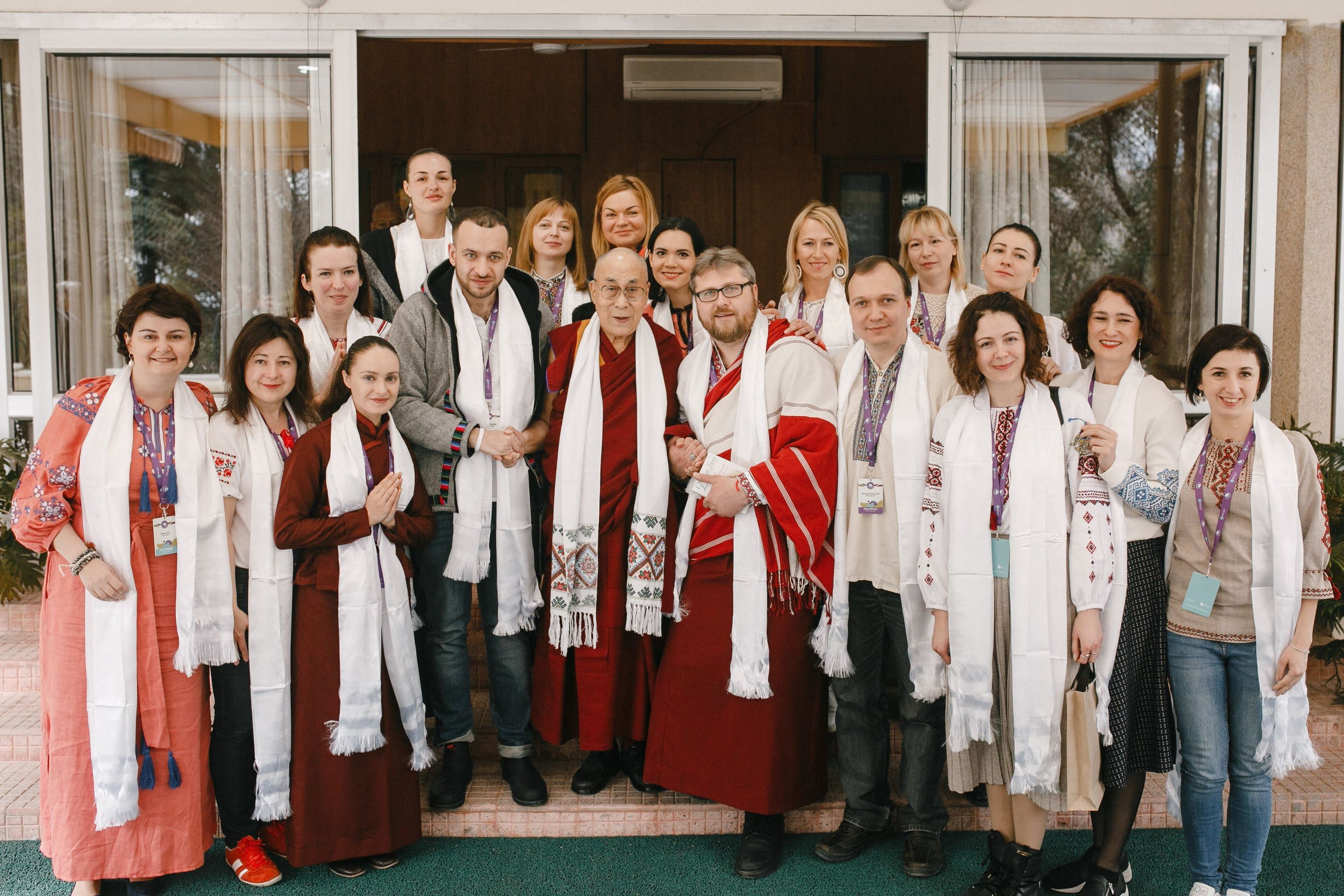
EdCamp Ukraine team meeting with Dalai Lama XIV (2019)

An EdTrip in 2019 visited Dharmsala, India. There, 16 participants were invited to meet with the Dalai Lama. He introduced the concept of Social Emotional Ethical Learning (SEE Learning), created by the Emory University in the US. The program is aimed at learning basic human skills such as resilience, empathy, and concentration. That same year, the EdCamp Ukraine team was invited to an official SEE Learning presentation in New Delhi.

The concept of SEE Learning was widely discussed during the fifth unconference. The concept was supported by the Deutsche Gesellschaft für Internationale Zusammenarbeit (GIZ) and incorporated in 26 Ukrainian schools from 23 regions of the country for a trial period as part of the New Ukrainian School (Ukrainian: Нова Українська Школа) reform. After the success of the SEE Learning trials, the program was officially introduced in 26 Ukrainian schools.

By 2020, EdCamp Ukraine became Emory University's official SEE Learning partner in Ukraine and launched introductory online sessions on SEE Learning to around 20,000 educators. Teachers in schools that incorporated the program took part in training sessions with program developers from Emory University (US) and Ukrainian experts working on the project.

In 2020, for the first time in the history of Ukraine, an online conversation between Dalai Lama XIV and the Ukrainian people was held. The meeting was hosted by Oleksandr Elkin; Liliya Hrynevych, former Minister of Education and Science of Ukraine; Taras Topolya, UNICEF Youth Ambassador to Ukraine and well-known Ukrainian singer; and Nataliya Moseychuk, a TV host recognized nationwide. Topics were education for peace, peace in the world, and the pandemic's influence on the world. The Dalai Lama also answered questions from Ukrainian citizens.

== Awards and recognition ==
=== Organization ===
In 2017, EdCamp Ukraine won first prize at the 5th National Competition of Public Non-Government Organizations (Ukrainian: V Національний Конкурс Публічних Звітів Організацій Громадянського Суспільства).

=== Personal achievements ===
In 2017, Focus magazine listed Oleksandr Elkin among the 100 most influential Ukrainians.

In 2018, Oleksandr Elkin was among five Ukrainian men nominated for the 2019 Father of the Year award in the Father-Educator category.

In 2020, the vice-president of EdCamp Ukraine Olena Massalitina was awarded Woman of the Year in the Secondary Education category within the "Ukrainian Women" contest. The same year, she became one of the 100 Most Influential Ukrainian Women as chosen by Focus magazine.

In 2021, Oleksandr Elkin entered the ranking of the 100 most influential people in Ukraine according to the rating of FOCUS magazine and took 85th place.

In 2022, NV named Oleksandr Elkin a "Ukrainian Prometheus".

In May 2022, Olexander Elkin became a member of the Supervisory Board of VN Karazin Kharkiv National University.

== Records ==
As part of the fourth national unconference in 2018, 600 EdCampers gathered at Constitution Square in Kharkiv for a flash mob. This gathering was later registered in the Ukrainian Record Book as the biggest educators' gathering.

In 2019, Ukrainian and international educators set another record during the 2019 unconference: 650 educators gathered at Constitution Square in Kharkiv and educators from 25 Ukrainian regions joined the flash mob online. "The biggest number of locations to join an online educators' flash mob" was registered in the Ukraine Record Book.

In 2020, more than 10,000 people attended the EdCamp Ukraine online unconference, the largest attendance of an online educational conference in Ukraine to date. This record was registered in Ukrainian National Record Register.

== See also ==
- EdCamp
- Ministry of Education and Science of Ukraine
- United Nations Population Fund
- Heinrich Böll Foundation
- Professional development
- Global Teacher Prize

== Literature cited ==
- "Nova Ukrai'ns'ka shkola korotko" Нова Українська школа коротко [New Ukrainian School: in short], Nova Ukrai'ns'ka shkola Нова Українська школа [New Ukrainian school] (in Ukrainian), Kyiv: GO "Smart Osvita"
- El'kin, Oleksandr (ed.), "EdCamp-marafon" EdCamp-марафон [EdCamp-marafon], EdCamp Ukraine (in Ukrainian), Kyiv: Gromads'ka organizacija «EdKemp Ukrai'na»
- El'kin, Oleksandr (ed.), "Navchaty i navchatysja: jak i kudy zrostaty ukrai'ns'komu vchytel'stvu?" Навчати і навчатися: як і куди зростати українському вчительству? [Teach and learn: how and where do Ukrainian teachers grow?], EdCamp Ukraine (in Ukrainian), Kyiv: Gromads'ka organizacija «EdKemp Ukrai'na»
- El'kin, Oleksandr (ed.), "#OSVITABEZDYSKRYMINACII'" #ОСВІТАБЕЗДИСКРИМІНАЦІЇ [#NONDISCRIMINATION], EdCamp Ukraine (in Ukrainian), Kyiv: Gromads'ka organizacija «EdKemp Ukrai'na»
- El'kin, Oleksandr (ed.), "#OSVITABEZKORUPCII'" #ОСВІТАБЕЗКОРУПЦІЇ [#SCHOOLWITHOUTCORRUPTION], EdCamp Ukraine (in Ukrainian), Kyiv: Gromads'ka organizacija «EdKemp Ukrai'na»
- El'kin, Oleksandr (ed.), "Onlajn eter z Dalaj-Lamoju" Онлайн етер з Далай-Ламою [Online broadcast with Dalai Lama], EdCamp Ukraine (in Ukrainian), Kyiv: Gromads'ka organizacija «EdKemp Ukrai'na»
- El'kin, Oleksandr, ed. (15 July 2019), "Prezydent Ukrai'ny Volodymyr Zelens'kyj vidpoviv na videozvernennja spil'noty EdCamp Ukraine" Президент України Володимир Зеленський відповів на відеозвернення спільноти EdCamp Ukraine [President of Ukraine Volodymyr Zelenskyy responded to a video message from the EdCamp Ukraine community], EdCamp Ukraine (in Ukrainian), Kyiv: Gromads'ka organizacija «EdKemp Ukrai'na»
- "Oleksandr Elkin", globaldignity.org, New York: Global Dignity
- Palyvoda, Ljubov (ed.), "Za krashhu prozorist' ta publichnist' dijal'nosti organizacij gromadjans'kogo suspil'stva" За кращу прозорість та публічність діяльності організацій громадянського суспільства [For the best transparency and publicity of civil society organizations], Tvorchyj centr Kaunterpart Творчий центр Каунтерпарт [Counterpart Creative Center] (in Ukrainian), Kyiv: Counterpart International
- Pokatis, Viktorija, ed. (26 June 2015), "8 zolotyh pravil, kak sdelat' obuchenie dlja rebenka interesnym" 8 золотых правил, как сделать обучение для ребенка интересным [8 golden rules to make your child's learning experience fun], WoMo (in Russian), Kyiv: Working Moms
- "Edcamp Community by Digital Promise", hundred.org, Helsinki: HundrED, 7 August 2018
- Prymachenko, Ivan; Molchanovs'kyj, Oleksij (eds.), "Pidvyshhennja kvalifikacii' pedagogichnyh pracivnykiv: novi vymogy i mozhlyvosti" Підвищення кваліфікації педагогічних працівників: нові вимоги і можливості [Certification training of teachers: new requirements and opportunities], prometheus.org.ua (in Ukrainian), Kyiv: Prometheus
- "EdCamp Ukraine", mixcloud.com, London: Mixcloud
- Pokatis, Viktorija, ed. (18 April 2018), "Global Teacher Prize: V Ukrai'ni obyratymut' najkrashhogo vchytelja" Global Teacher Prize: В Україні обиратимуть найкращого вчителя [Global Teacher Prize: The best teacher will be chosen in Ukraine], WoMo (in Ukrainian), Kyiv: Working Moms
- Stepanovskiy, Oleksiy, ed. (January 22, 2016), "The second national (un)conference for school teachers EdCamp Ukraine", schoolchampion.in.ua, Kharkiv: School Champion
- Zubar, Natalija, ed. (April 9, 2016), "Druga Nacional'na osvitnja (ne)konferencija EdCamp Ukraine" Друга Національна освітня (не)конференція EdCamp Ukraine [Second National Educational (un)conference EdCamp Ukraine], maidan.org.ua (in Ukrainian), Kharkiv: Maidan Monitoring Information Center
- Harchenko, Oleksandr, ed. (April 10, 2016), "EdCamp Ukraine: vchyteliv navchajut' vidhodyty vid avtorytarnoi' modeli osvity" EdCamp Ukraine: вчителів навчають відходити від авторитарної моделі освіти [EdCamp Ukraine: teachers are taught to move away from the authoritarian model of education], Ukrinform Укрінформ [Ukrinform] (in Ukrainian), Government of Ukraine: Cabinet of Ministers
- "Spil'na iniciatyva MON i EdCamp Ukraine z debjurokratyzacii' shkil'noi' dijal'nosti: "Skasuvaty nepotribnu zvitnist' u shkоlah ta vyvil'nyty chas osvitjan dlja roboty z dit'my"" Спільна ініціатива МОН і EdCamp Ukraine з дебюрократизації шкільної діяльності: «Скасувати непотрібну звітність у школах та вивільнити час освітян для роботи з дітьми» [Joint initiative of the Ministry of Education and Science and EdCamp Ukraine to debureaucratize school activities: "Eliminate unnecessary reporting in schools and free up time for teachers to work with children"], Ministerstvo osvity i nauky Ukrai'ny Міністерство освіти і науки України [Ministry of Education and Science] (in Ukrainian), Kyiv: Cabinet of Ministers of Ukraine, October 12, 2016, archived from the original on February 9, 2021
- "Nova ukrai'ns'ka shkola" Нова українська школа [New Ukrainian school] (PDF), Ministerstvo osvity i nauky Ukrai'ny Міністерство освіти і науки України [Ministry of Education and Science] (in Ukrainian), Kyiv: Cabinet of Ministers of Ukraine, October 27, 2016
- "Lilija Grynevych pryjednajet'sja do 600 vchyteliv na EdCamp Ukraine 2017" Лілія Гриневич приєднається до 600 вчителів на EdCamp Ukraine 2017 [Lilia Hrynevych will join 600 teachers at EdCamp Ukraine 2017], Ministerstvo osvity i nauky Ukrai'ny Міністерство освіти і науки України [Ministry of Education and Science] (in Ukrainian), Kyiv: Cabinet of Ministers of Ukraine, March 10, 2017, archived from the original on December 7, 2017
- Ser Ken Robinson vitaje EdCamp Ukraine 2017 Сер Кен Робінсон вітає EdCamp Ukraine 2017 [Sir Ken Robinson welcomes EdCamp Ukraine 2017] (in Ukrainian), San Bruno: YouTube, April 29, 2017
- "U Kharkovi prokhodytʹ natsionalʹna (ne)konferentsiya «EdCamp Ukraine – 2017»" У Харкові проходить національна (не)конференція «EdCamp Ukraine – 2017» [National (un)conference "EdCamp Ukraine - 2017" is being held in Kharkiv], Oficial'nyj sajt Har'kovskogo gorodskogo soveta, gorodskogo golovy, ispolnitel'nogo komiteta Харків (in Ukrainian), Kharkiv: Har'kovskij gorodskoj sovet, April 29, 2017
- "EdCamp Ukraine — 2017", Poltavs'kyj nacional'nyj pedagogichnyj universytet imeni Volodymyra Korolenka Полтавський національний педагогічний університет імені Володимира Короленка [Poltava V.G. Korolenko National Pedagogical University] (in Ukrainian), Kyiv: Ministry of Education and Science of Ukraine, May 3, 2017
- "Vchitelіv zvіl'nili vіd hodіnnja po mіkrorajonu" Вчителів звільнили від ходіння по мікрорайону [Teachers were released from walking around the district], osvita.ua (in Ukrainian), Kyiv: Osvіta, September 13, 2017
- Sergij Zhadan startuje flesh-mob #knygoNUSh Сергій Жадан стартує флеш-моб #книгоНУШ [Serhiy Zhadan starts the flash mob #knigoNUSH] (in Ukrainian), San Bruno: YouTube, October 11, 2017
- Sushko, Lana, ed. (March 30, 2018), "Uchast' v konferencijah EdCamp Ukraine" Участь в конференціях EdCamp Ukraine [Participation in EdCamp Ukraine conferences], SOVa (in Ukrainian), Kyiv: Studija Osvity dlja Vykladachiv
- Hil', Olena, ed. (July 2, 2018), "Jak provesty EdCamp dlja svojei' gromady" Як провести EdCamp для своєї громади [How to get EdCamp for your community], VUM on-line ВУМ on-line [VUM on-line] (in Ukrainian), Kyiv: Vidkrytyj universytet Majdanu
- "Jak provesty EdCamp dlja svojei' gromady – bezkoshtovnyj onlajn kurs na VUM online" Як провести EdCamp для своєї громади – безкоштовний онлайн курс на ВУМ online [How to get EdCamp for your community - a free online course at VUM online], Prostir.Ua (in Ukrainian), Kyiv: Gromads'kyj Prostir, July 2, 2018
- "Uchytel'stvo – za shkolu jak prostir, bezpechnyj dlja dytyny: pedagogy vstanovyly nacional'nyj rekord u Harkovi pid chas EdCamp Ukraine 2018" Учительство – за школу як простір, безпечний для дитини: педагоги встановили національний рекорд у Харкові під час EdCamp Ukraine 2018 [Teaching - for school as a space safe place for children: teachers set a national record in Kharkiv during EdCamp Ukraine 2018], Ministerstvo osvity i nauky Ukrai'ny Міністерство освіти і науки України [Ministry of Education and Science] (in Ukrainian), Kyiv: Cabinet of Ministers of Ukraine, July 3, 2018, archived from the original on February 6, 2021
- "Pedagogy vstanovyly nacional'nyj rekord u Harkovi pid chas EdCamp Ukraine 2018" Педагоги встановили національний рекорд у Харкові під час EdCamp Ukraine 2018 [Teachers set a national record in Kharkiv during EdCamp Ukraine 2018], Secretariat of Cabinet of Ministers Секретаріату Кабінету Міністрів України [Secretariat of Cabinet of Ministers] (in Ukrainian), Kyiv: Cabinet of Ministers of Ukraine, July 3, 2018
- "Nakaz MON vid 25 chervnja 2018 r. "Pro zatverdzhennja Instrukcii' z dilovodstva u zakladah zagal'noi' seredn'oi' osvity" (Zarejestrovano v Ministerstvi justycii' Ukrai'ny 11 veresnja 2018 r. № 1028/32480)" Наказ МОН від 25 червня 2018 р. "Про затвердження Інструкції з діловодства у закладах загальної середньої освіти" (Зареєстровано в Міністерстві юстиції України 11 вересня 2018 р. № 1028/32480) [Decree of the Ministry of Education and Science of June 25, 2018 "On approval of the Instruction on record keeping in general secondary education institutions" (Registered in the Ministry of Justice of Ukraine on September 11, 2018 № 1028/32480)], Ministerstvo osvity i nauky Ukrai'ny Міністерство освіти і науки України [Ministry of Education and Science] (in Ukrainian), Kyiv: Cabinet of Ministers of Ukraine, September 11, 2018, archived from the original on February 13, 2021
- "Dev'jat' osvitnih organizacij ob'jednajut' zusyllja, shhob pidtrymuvaty reformu" Дев'ять освітніх організацій об'єднають зусилля, щоб підтримувати реформу [Nine educational organizations are joining forces to support the reform], Nova Ukrai'ns'ka shkola Нова Українська школа [New Ukrainian school] (in Ukrainian), Kyiv: GO "Smart Osvita", December 3, 2018
- "Golosuvannja: Nominacija "Tato-osvitjanyn"" Голосування: Номінація "Тато-освітянин" [Vote: Nomination "Dad-educator"], Tato Roku Тато Року [Father of the Year] (in Ukrainian), Lausanne: Edipresse, 2019
- "EdCamp Ukraine priglashaet Zelenskogo v Har'kov obsudit' obrazovanie (video)" EdCamp Ukraine приглашает Зеленского в Харьков обсудить образование (видео) [EdCamp Ukraine invites Zelenskyy to Kharkiv to discuss education (video)], mykharkov.info (in Russian), Kharkiv: Novosti Har'kova, May 6, 2019
- Harchenko, Oleksandr, ed. (July 7, 2019), "V Har'kove 5-j uchitel'skij EdCamp Ukraine sobral okolo tysjachi pedagogov i jekspertov" В Харькове 5-й учительский EdCamp Ukraine собрал около тысячи педагогов и экспертов [The 5th pedagogical EdCamp Ukraine gathered about a thousand teachers and experts in Kharkiv], Ukrinform Укрінформ [Ukrinform] (in Russian), Government of Ukraine: Cabinet of Ministers, archived from the original on July 8, 2019
- Harchenko, Oleksandr, ed. (July 8, 2019), "Grynevych anonsuvala pilotnu shkil'nu programu SEE Learning" Гриневич анонсувала пілотну шкільну програму SEE Learning [Hrynevych announced a pilot school program SEE Learning], Ukrinform Укрінформ [Ukrinform] (in Ukrainian), Government of Ukraine: Cabinet of Ministers
- Harchenko, Oleksandr, ed. (July 8, 2019), "Na EdCamp fleshmob uchyteliv ustanovyv rekord" На EdCamp флешмоб учителів установив рекорд [The teachers' flash mob set a record at EdCamp], Ukrinform Укрінформ [Ukrinform] (in Ukrainian), Government of Ukraine: Cabinet of Ministers
- Guk, Ol'ga, ed. (July 8, 2019), "V Har'kove otkrylsja masshtabnyj forum EdCamp Ukraine" В Харькове открылся масштабный форум EdCamp Ukraine [Large-scale forum EdCamp Ukraine has opened in Kharkiv], Segodnya (in Russian), Kyiv: Media Group Ukraine, OCLC 899365656, archived from the original on July 9, 2019
- Gordejchik, Evgenij, ed. (July 9, 2019), "Ukrainskie uchitelja ustanovili rekord v podderzhku svoej professii – na EdCamp Ukraine 2019" Украинские учителя установили рекорд в поддержку своей профессии – на EdCamp Ukraine 2019 [Ukrainian teachers set a record in support of their profession - at EdCamp Ukraine 2019], Focus ФОКУС [Focus] (in Russian), Kyiv: UMH group
- El'kin, Oleksandr, ed. (July 15, 2019), "Dalaj-lama IV zvernuvsja do spil'noty vidpovidal'nogo vchytel'stva na EdCamp Ukraine 2019" Далай-лама ІV звернувся до спільноти відповідального вчительства на EdCamp Ukraine 2019 [The Dalai Lama IV addressed the responsible teaching community at EdCamp Ukraine 2019], EdCamp Ukraine (in Ukrainian), Kyiv: Gromads'ka organizacija «EdKemp Ukrai'na»
- "Postanova № 800: Dejaki pytannja pidvyshhennja kvalifikacii' pedagogichnyh i naukovo-pedagogichnyh pracivnykiv" Постанова № 800: Деякі питання підвищення кваліфікації педагогічних і науково-педагогічних працівників [Decree № 800: Some issues of professional development of pedagogical and scientific-pedagogical workers], zakon.rada.gov.ua (in Ukrainian), Kyiv: Office of the President of Ukraine, August 21, 2019
- "U 26 shkolah pochavsja pilot z vprovadzhennja programy rozvytku m'jakyh navychok SEEN: social'no-emocijnogo ta etychnogo navchannja" У 26 школах почався пілот з впровадження програми розвитку м'яких навичок СЕЕН: соціально-емоційного та етичного навчання [The SEEN soft skills pilot project started in 26 schools: socio-emotional and ethical learning], Ministerstvo osvity i nauky Ukrai'ny Міністерство освіти і науки України [Ministry of Education and Science] (in Ukrainian), Kyiv: Cabinet of Ministers of Ukraine, October 7, 2019, archived from the original on January 23, 2021
- "Postanova № 1133: Pro vnesennja zmin do Porjadku pidvyshhennja kvalifikacii' pedagogichnyh i naukovo-pedagogichnyh pracivnykiv" Постанова № 1133: Про внесення змін до Порядку підвищення кваліфікації педагогічних і науково-педагогічних працівників [Decree № 1133: On amendments to the Procedure for professional development of pedagogical and scientific-pedagogical workers], zakon.rada.gov.ua (in Ukrainian), Kyiv: Office of the President of Ukraine, December 27, 2019
- "Usesvitnij Den' Gidnosti v Ukrai'ni" Усесвітній День Гідності в Україні [World Dignity Day in Ukraine] (PDF), Nova Ukrai'ns'ka shkola Нова Українська школа [New Ukrainian school] (in Ukrainian), Kyiv: GO "Smart Osvita", 2020
- "Pro utvorennja robochoi' grupy z pytan' profesijnogo rozvytku pedagogichnyh pracivnykiv" Про утворення робочої групи з питань професійного розвитку педагогічних працівників [On the establishment of a working group on professional development of teachers of June 25, 2018 "On approval of the Instruction on record keeping in general secondary education institutions" (Registered in the Ministry of Justice of Ukraine on September 11, 2018 № 1028/32480)], Ministerstvo osvity i nauky Ukrai'ny Міністерство освіти і науки України [Ministry of Education and Science] (in Ukrainian), Kyiv: Cabinet of Ministers of Ukraine, February 17, 2020, archived from the original on February 5, 2021
- "Jak vіdbuvatimet'sja onlajn-marafon EdCamp 2020" Як відбуватиметься онлайн-марафон EdCamp 2020 [How the EdCamp 2020 online marathon will take place], osvita.ua (in Ukrainian), Kyiv: Osvіta, April 13, 2020
- Onlajn-EdCamp 2020 – Olena Zelens'ka: Najkrashhi z vas ne prosto navchajut'. Vony navchajut' navchatysja! Онлайн-EdCamp 2020 – Олена Зеленська: Найкращі з вас не просто навчають. Вони навчають навчатися! [Online EdCamp 2020 - Olena Zelenska: The best of you don't just teach. They teach to learn!] (in Ukrainian), San Bruno: YouTube, April 17, 2020
- Bacman, Alesja, ed. (April 17, 2020), "Topolja na onlajn-konferencii EdCamp 2020 spel gimn Ukrainy kak kolybel'nuju" Тополя на онлайн-конференции EdCamp 2020 спел гимн Украины как колыбельную [Topolya sang the anthem of Ukraine as a lullaby at the EdCamp 2020 online conference], gordonua.com (in Russian), Kyiv: GORDON
- "Taras Topolja zaspivav gimn dlja osvitjan ta bat'kiv na onlajn-EdCamp'i" Тарас Тополя заспівав гімн для освітян та батьків на онлайн-EdCamp'і [Taras Topolya sang the anthem to educators and parents in the EdCamp online], Novyny Poltavshhyny Новини Полтавщини [News of Poltava region] (in Ukrainian), Poltava: Poltava Oblast Council, April 17, 2020
- Krapyvenko, Dmytro, ed. (April 22, 2020), ""Zaraz vash chas!". Harari, Dalaj-Lama ta inshi svitovi lidery dumok zvernulysja do ukrai'ns'kogo vchytel'stva" «Зараз ваш час!». Харарі, Далай-Лама та інші світові лідери думок звернулися до українського вчительства ["Now is your time!" Harari, the Dalai Lama and other world opinion leaders turned to Ukrainian teachers], The Ukrainian Week Український тиждень [The Ukrainian Week] (in Ukrainian), Kyiv: TOV Ukrainskyi Tyzhden, ISSN 1996-1561, OCLC 190621534
- Harchenko, Oleksandr, ed. (April 24, 2020), "Harkivs'kyj onlajn-EdCamp 2020 zibrav rekordnu kil'kist' uchasnykiv" Харківський онлайн-EdCamp 2020 зібрав рекордну кількість учасників [Kharkiv online EdCamp 2020 gathered a record number of participants], Ukrinform Укрінформ [Ukrinform] (in Ukrainian), Government of Ukraine: Cabinet of Ministers
- "Analityk AMU vzjala uchast' v onlajn-toloci EdCamp Ukraine" Аналітик АМУ взяла участь в онлайн-толоці EdCamp Ukraine [The AUC analyst took part in the EdCamp Ukraine online campaign], auc.org.ua, Kyiv: Association of Ukrainian Cities, June 2, 2020
- Santarovych, Ol'ga, ed. (August 6, 2020), "MON snjalo s sebja otvetstvennost' za obespechenie shkol maskami i antiseptikami" МОН сняло с себя ответственность за обеспечение школ масками и антисептиками [The Ministry of Education and Science declines responsibility for providing schools with masks and antiseptics], Delovaya Stolitsa Деловая столица [Business Capital] (in Russian), Kyiv: PrAT «Kartel'»
- "Molding a corruption-free future", United States Agency for International Development, Washington: Federal government of the United States, August 10, 2020
- Gannickij, Mihail, ed. (October 6, 2020), "Dalaj-lama vpershe pospilkujet'sja z ukrai'ncjamy v prjamomu efiri" Далай-лама вперше поспілкується з українцями в прямому ефірі [The Dalai Lama is going to talk to Ukrainians live for the first time], UNIAN УНІАН [UNIAN] (in Ukrainian), Kyiv: 1+1 Media Group
- "Golosuj za molodyh vchyteliv, jaki budut' suchasnu ukrai'ns'ku shkolu na shodi. Konkurs" Голосуй за молодих вчителів, які будуть сучасну українську школу на сході. Конкурс [Vote for young teachers who will become a modern Ukrainian school in the east. Contest], dobronews.city (in Ukrainian), Dobropillia, October 6, 2020
- Gordejchik, Evgenij, ed. (October 18, 2020), "100 samyh vlijatel'nyh zhenshhin Ukrainy po versii zhurnala Fokus" 100 самых влиятельных женщин Украины по версии журнала Фокус [100 most influential women in Ukraine according to Focus magazine], Focus ФОКУС [Focus] (in Russian), Kyiv: UMH group
- Gannickij, Mihail, ed. (October 20, 2020), "Dalaj-lama vpershe pospilkuvavsja z ukrai'ncjamy v prjamomu efiri (video)" Далай-лама вперше поспілкувався з українцями в прямому ефірі (відео) [The Dalai Lama spoke to Ukrainians live for the first time (video)], UNIAN УНІАН [UNIAN] (in Ukrainian), Kyiv: 1+1 Media Group
- "Educating the Heart - Discussion with EdCamp Ukraine", dalailama.com, McLeod Ganj: The Office of His Holiness the Dalai Lama, October 20, 2020
- "Shkolam proponujut' provesty uroky-dyskusii' do Dnja Gidnosti – nadadut' materialy ta pidtrymku" Школам пропонують провести уроки-дискусії до Дня Гідності – нададуть матеріали та підтримку [Schools are invited to hold lessons-discussions for the Day of Dignity - will provide materials and support], Nova Ukrai'ns'ka shkola Нова Українська школа [New Ukrainian school] (in Ukrainian), Kyiv: GO "Smart Osvita", October 20, 2020
- Ivshyna, Larysa, ed. (October 21, 2020), "Upershe v istorii' lavreat Nobelivs'koi' premii' myru Dalaj-lama XIV pospilkuvavsja z ukrai'ncjamy" Уперше в історії лавреат Нобелівської премії миру Далай-лама XIV поспілкувався з українцями [For the first time in history, the laureate of the Nobel Peace Prize Dalai Lama XIV talked to Ukrainians], The Day День [The Day] (in Ukrainian), Kyiv: TOV «Ukrai'ns'ka pres-grupa»
- Bondar, Marija (October 26, 2020), Konsevych, Ol'ga (ed.), "4 vazhlyvi cytaty Dalaj-lamy pro osvitu ta vyhovannja" 4 важливі цитати Далай-лами про освіту та виховання [4 important quotes from the Dalai Lama about education and upbringing], Telekanal novyn «24» Телеканал новин «24» [TV news channel "24"] (in Ukrainian), Lviv: Teleradiokompanija Ljuks
- Chernova, Oleksandra (October 16, 2017), Kariakina, Angelina (ed.), ""Ja ne stavlju pytan', ja stymuljuju uchniv pytaty mene", — najkrashhyj uchytel' Ukrai'ny Paul Pshenichka" «Я не ставлю питань, я стимулюю учнів питати мене», — найкращий учитель України Паул Пшенічка ["I don't ask questions, I encourage students to ask me", - the best teacher of Ukraine Paul Pshenichka], Hromadske.TV Громадське Телебачення [Public TV] (in Ukrainian), Kyiv: Interfax-Ukraine
- Dharpo, Tenzin (October 20, 2020), Woeser, Sherab (ed.), "SEE learning program introduced in Ukrainian schools", phayul.com, New Delhi
- El'kin, Oleksandr; Min'kovs'ka, Iryna; Malahova, Olena; Marushhenko, Oleg; Andrusyk, Ol'ga (2017), Malahova, Olena; Shherbakova, N. (eds.), Dity i papery: jak dosjagty balansu u shkoli? Діти і папери: як досягти балансу у школі? [Children and papers: how to achieve balance in school] (in Ukrainian), Kharkiv: Ranok, ISBN 978-6170931801
- El'kin, Oleksandr (2018), Masalitina, Olena; Min'kovs'ka, Iryna (eds.), Zrostajmo razom z EdCamp'om. Jak provesty osvitnju (ne)konferenciju dlja svojei' gromady Зростаймо разом з EdCamp'ом. Як провести освітню (не)конференцію для своєї громади [Growing together with EdCamp. How to get an educational (un)conference for your community] (in Ukrainian), Kyiv: Shkil'nyj svit, ISBN 978-6177287888
- El'kin, Oleksandr (June 5, 2019), "P'jat' i odyn sposib, jak Shvecija zaluchaje bat'kivstvo do shkoly" П'ять і один спосіб, як Швеція залучає батьківство до школи [Sweden's five and one ways involve parenting at school], Nova Ukrai'ns'ka shkola Нова Українська школа [New Ukrainian school] (in Ukrainian), Kyiv: GO "Smart Osvita"
- Farisej, Andrej; Babenko, Marija; Makarenko, Oksana; Feja, Oleg; Sinjashhik, Anna; Kolodjuk, Andrej; Borodatjuk, Artjom; Dovgopolyj, Denis (December 26, 2017), Gordejchik, Evgenij (ed.), "Genial'nye ljudi. Ukraincy, kotorye menjajut stranu i mir" Гениальные люди. Украинцы, которые меняют страну и мир [Brilliant people. Ukrainians who are changing the country and the world], Focus ФОКУС [Focus] (in Russian), Kyiv: UMH group
- Golovina, Ol'ga (June 2, 2020), "Jak planujut' zminyty proceduru vyboru pidruchnykiv" Як планують змінити процедуру вибору підручників [How plan to change the procedure for selecting textbooks], Nova Ukrai'ns'ka shkola Нова Українська школа [New Ukrainian school] (in Ukrainian), Kyiv: GO "Smart Osvita"
- Gromljuk, Ilona (December 28, 2017), Ligachova, Natalіja (ed.), "Osvita jak nacional'na ideja. Najkrashhi proekty, jaki formuvaly i'i' v 2017 roci" Освіта як національна ідея. Найкращі проекти, які формували її в 2017 році [Education as a national idea. The best projects that shaped it in 2017], MediaSapiens (in Ukrainian), Kyiv: «Detektor media»
- Kellogg, Caroline (January 13, 1980), "Frank Ross, a developer with vision", Tacoma News Tribune, Tacoma: Tribune Publishing Company, LCCN sn86072045, OCLC 14402924
- Koval'chuk, Galina (March 25, 2018c), Gordejchik, Evgenij (ed.), "Finny pod Poltavoj. Kak skandinavskie uchitelja provodili uroki v sel'skoj shkole" Финны под Полтавой. Как скандинавские учителя проводили уроки в сельской школе [Finns near Poltava. How Scandinavian teachers taught in a rural school], Focus ФОКУС [Focus] (in Russian), Kyiv: UMH group
- Koval'chuk, Galina (July 11, 2018a), Gordejchik, Evgenij (ed.), "Ministr i boli obrazovanija. Kak Lilija Grinevich otvechala na voprosy uchitelej" Министр и боли образования. Как Лилия Гриневич отвечала на вопросы учителей [Minister and Pain of Education. How Lilia Grinevich answered teachers' questions], Focus ФОКУС [Focus] (in Russian), Kyiv: UMH group
- Koval'chuk, Galina (September 1, 2018b), Gordejchik, Evgenij (ed.), "Obratnaja storona professii. Chego hotjat ukrainskie uchitelja" Обратная сторона профессии. Чего хотят украинские учителя [The reverse side of the profession. What Ukrainian teachers want], Focus ФОКУС [Focus] (in Russian), Kyiv: UMH group
- Koval'ova, Diana (October 19, 2020), MakGaffi, Julija (ed.), "Dalaj-lama vpershe pospilkujet'sja z ukrai'ncjamy onlajn — koly projde transljacija" Далай-лама вперше поспілкується з українцями онлайн — коли пройде трансляція [The Dalai Lama is going communicate with Ukrainians on the Internet for the first time - when the broadcast will take place], Novoe Vremja Новое Время [New Time] (in Ukrainian), Kyiv: TOV «Vydavnychyj dim «Media-DK»
- Kozachenko, Viktorija (December 9, 2020), Musayeva, Sevgil (ed.), "Zhyttja bez korupcii'. Chomu dobrochesnist' maje staty novoju normoju?" Життя без корупції. Чому доброчесність має стати новою нормою? [Life without corruption. Why should integrity become the new norm?], Ukrayinska Pravda Українська правда [Ukrainian Pravda] (in Ukrainian), Kyiv: Kyiv MediaHub, OCLC 1066371688
- Kuklin, Denys (August 9, 2018), Koshkina, Sonja (ed.), "Shkoly nashoi' mrii' isnujut'" Школи нашої мрії існують [The schools of our dreams exist], lb.ua (in Ukrainian), Kyiv
- Kuklin, Denys; El'kin, Oleksandr; Masalitina, Olena; Marushhenko, Oleg; Shkr'ob, Vira (2020), Lebedenko, Julija (ed.), EDKEMPODENNJa: Zvit pro dijal'nist' EdCamp Ukraine za 2018-2020 roky ЕДКЕМПОДЕННЯ: Звіт про діяльність EdCamp Ukraine за 2018-2020 роки [EDCAMPODENNYA: Report on the activities of EdCamp Ukraine for 2018-2020] (in Ukrainian), Kyiv: EdCamp Ukraine
- Kuklin, Denys (May 26, 2020a), "Pro osvitu v Gruzii', Bilorusi, Virmenii' ta Moldovi j chomu vchyteli zvidty pryi'dut' na mizhnarodnyj EdCamp v Ukrai'nu" Про освіту в Грузії, Білорусі, Вірменії та Молдові й чому вчителі звідти приїдуть на міжнародний EdCamp в Україну [About education in Georgia, Belarus, Armenia and Moldova and why teachers from there will come to the international EdCamp in Ukraine], Nova Ukrai'ns'ka shkola Нова Українська школа [New Ukrainian school] (in Ukrainian), Kyiv: GO "Smart Osvita"
- Kuklin, Denys (December 21, 2020b), "Іnsajti pro ukraїns'ke vchitel'stvo vіd EdCamp'u: 5 rokіv do j pіslja" Інсайти про українське вчительство від EdCamp'у: 5 років до й після [Insights about Ukrainian teaching from EdCamp: 5 years before and after], Nova Ukrai'ns'ka shkola Нова Українська школа [New Ukrainian school] (in Ukrainian), Kyiv: GO "Smart Osvita"
- Kyporenko, Iryna (January 13, 2019), Bereznic'ka, Inna (ed.), "Ruh vidpovidal'nogo vchytel'stva" Рух відповідального вчительства [The responsible educational movement], theukrainians.org (in Ukrainian), Kyiv: The Ukrainians
- Lapin, Jevgen (October 5, 2020), Musayeva, Sevgil (ed.), "Chomu vchyteliv ne vlashtovuje dystancijne navchannja, ta shho z cym robyty. Dumky 4-h osvitnih ekspertiv" Чому вчителів не влаштовує дистанційне навчання, та що з цим робити. Думки 4-х освітніх експертів [Why teachers are not satisfied with distance learning, and what to do about it. Opinions of 4 educational experts], Ukrayinska Pravda Українська правда [Ukrainian Pravda] (in Ukrainian), Kyiv: Kyiv MediaHub, OCLC 1066371688
- Modica, Allison (April 8, 2020), United States and Ukraine: Virtual Edcamps, Education continuity stories, Paris: OECD Publishing
- Nagaevshhuk, Alena (December 20, 2018), Leptuga, Elena (ed.), "Pedagogy u poshukah dyskryminacii' v pidruchnykah" Педагоги у пошуках дискримінації в підручниках [Teachers in search of discrimination in textbooks], nakipelo.ua (in Ukrainian), Kharkiv: GO "Har'kovskij Krizisnyj Infocentr"
- Narizhna, Larisa (June 27, 2018), Fedorkova, Tat'jana (ed.), "V Har'kove projdjot chetvjortaja konferencija pedagogov EdCamp Ukraine" В Харькове пройдёт четвёртая конференция педагогов EdCamp Ukraine [The fourth conference of teachers EdCamp Ukraine will be held in Kharkiv], mediaport.ua (in Russian), Kharkiv: MediaPort
- Omel'chenko, Valerija (January 6, 2016), "Oleksandr El'kin: "EdSamp – ce trenazher dlja osvitjan, jaki hochut' buty suchasnymy"" Олександр Елькін: «EdСamp – це тренажер для освітян, які хочуть бути сучасними» [Alexander Elkin: "EdCamp is a simulator for educators who want to be modern"], gurt.org.ua (in Ukrainian), Kyiv: GURT Resource Center
- Perekrest, Julija (July 31, 2018a), "EdCamp Ukraine 2018 відвідали понад 900 освітян та експерти з 11 країн світу" EdCamp Ukraine 2018 відвідали понад 900 освітян та експерти з 11 країн світу [EdCamp Ukraine 2018 was visited by more than 900 educators and experts from 11 countries], Osvitorija Media Освіторія Медіа [Osvitoria Media] (in Ukrainian), Kyiv: Osvitorija
- Perekrest, Julija (October 6, 2018b), "Bez planiv roboty ta v dovil'nij formi: nabula chynnosti nova Instrukcija z dilovodstva" Без планів роботи та в довільній формі: набула чинності нова Інструкція з діловодства [Without work plans and in any form: the new Instruction on office work has come into force], Osvitorija Media Освіторія Медіа [Osvitoria Media] (in Ukrainian), Kyiv: Osvitorija
- Prognimak, Kateryna (May 26, 2016), Musijenko, Olena (ed.), "Oleksandr El'kin, EdCamp Ukraine: "Revoljucija v osviti vidbuvajet'sja na shkil'nyh urokah"" Олександр Елькін, EdCamp Ukraine: «Революція в освіті відбувається на шкільних уроках» [Oleksandr Elkin, EdCamp Ukraine: "The revolution in education is taking place in school lessons"], imena.ua (in Ukrainian), Kyiv: Blog Imena.UA
- Prognimak, Kateryna (August 23, 2017), Musijenko, Olena (ed.), "Ruh EdCamp v Ukraїnі — jak gotujut' vіdpovіdal'ne vchitel'stvo dlja Novoї shkoli" Рух EdCamp в Україні — як готують відповідальне вчительство для Нової школи [The EdCamp movement in Ukraine - how to prepare responsible teachers for the New School], imena.ua (in Ukrainian), Kyiv: Blog Imena.UA
- Rarenko, Larysa (October 8, 2019), "10 golovnyh vidznak Global Teacher Prize Ukraine 2019" 10 головних відзнак Global Teacher Prize Ukraine 2019 [10 main awards of the Global Teacher Prize Ukraine 2019], Osvitorija Media Освіторія Медіа [Osvitoria Media] (in Ukrainian), Kyiv: Osvitorija
- Schaffhauser, Dian (July 20, 2020), Fletcher, Geoffrey H. (ed.), "Digital Promise Announces Merger with Edcamp, AI Pilot and New Digital Learning Microcredential", THE Journal, Woodland Hills: 1105 Media Inc.
- Shul'ga, Alina (April 30, 2017), Leptuga, Elena (ed.), "Na EdCamp sobralis' jeksperty iz 20 stran" На EdCamp собрались эксперты из 20 стран [Experts from 20 countries gathered at EdCamp], nakipelo.ua (in Russian), Kharkiv: GO "Har'kovskij Krizisnyj Infocentr"
- Shvadchak, Nadija (July 24, 2019), "Ukrai'ns'ki shkoly sprobujut' mizhnarodnu programu SEE Learning – chogo vona vchyt' i dlja chogo potribna" Українські школи спробують міжнародну програму SEE Learning – чого вона вчить і для чого потрібна [Ukrainian schools will try the international SEE Learning program - what it teaches and why it is needed], Nova Ukrai'ns'ka shkola Нова Українська школа [New Ukrainian school] (in Ukrainian), Kyiv: GO "Smart Osvita"
- Slavins'ka, Iryna (April 15, 2020), Troshhyns'ka, Tetjana (ed.), "Vchyteli vygadujut' najnejmovirnishi sposoby navchaty — Masalitina pro (ne)konferenciju EdCamp Ukraine" Вчителі вигадують найнеймовірніші способи навчати — Масалітіна про (не)конференцію EdCamp Ukraine [Teachers come up with the most incredible ways to teach - Masalitina about the (un)conference EdCamp Ukraine], Hromadske Radio Громадське радіо [Public radio] (in Ukrainian), Kyiv: Interfax-Ukraine
- Tokarchuk, Olena, ""EdCamp Ukraine": Rupor vchytel's'koi' dumky" «EdCamp Ukraine»: Рупор вчительської думки ["EdCamp Ukraine": The mouthpiece of teachers' opinion], Gromadjans'ke suspil'stvo - ce TY Громадянське суспільство - це ТИ [Civil society is YOU] (in Ukrainian), Brussels: European Union, archived from the original on December 7, 2020
- Topol, Viktorija; Tytysh, Galyna (November 2, 2017), "Jak EdSamp robyt' uchytel'ok i vchyteliv vazhlyvymy, abo Efekt dovgogo hvosta" Як EdСamp робить учительок і вчителів важливими, або Ефект довгого хвоста [How EdSamp Makes Schoolmistress and Teachers Different, or The Long Tail Effect], Nova Ukrai'ns'ka shkola Нова Українська школа [New Ukrainian school] (in Ukrainian), Kyiv: GO "Smart Osvita"
- Topol, Viktorija (February 24, 2018), "Jakoju je osvita u Finljandii' abo Zdorovyj g'luzd" Якою є освіта у Фінляндії або Здоровий ґлузд [What is education in Finland or Common Sense], Nova Ukrai'ns'ka shkola Нова Українська школа [New Ukrainian school] (in Ukrainian), Kyiv: GO "Smart Osvita"
- Turenko, Andrej (September 12, 2020), Turenko, Andrej (ed.), "14 vydatnyh ukrai'nok otrymaly zvannja «Zhinka Ukrai'ny 2020»: hto vony" 14 видатних українок отримали звання «Жінка України 2020»: хто вони [14 outstanding Ukrainian women received the title of "Woman of Ukraine 2020": who are they], edinstvennaya.ua (in Russian), Lausanne: Edipresse Group, archived from the original on November 24, 2020
- Tytysh, Galyna; Ringis, Anastasija (February 28, 2019), Musayeva, Sevgil (ed.), ""Borit'sja za sebe, ale z ljubov'ju v serci". Porady Dalaj-lamy ukrai'ncjam" "Боріться за себе, але з любов'ю в серці". Поради Далай-лами українцям ["Fight for yourself, but with love in your heart." Advice of Dalai Lama to Ukrainians], Ukrayinska Pravda Українська правда [Ukrainian Pravda] (in Ukrainian), Kyiv: Kyiv MediaHub, OCLC 1066371688
