= EdCamp =

Participant-driven conference

An EdCamp is a participant-driven conference – commonly referred to as an "unconference". EdCamps are designed to provide participant-driven professional development for K-12 educators. EdCamps are modeled after BarCamps, free participant-driven conferences with a primary focus on technology and computers. Educational technology is a common topic area for EdCamps, as are pedagogy, practical examples in instructional use of modern tools, and solving the problems technology can introduce into the classroom environment.

EdCamps are generally free or very low-cost, built around ad hoc community participation. Sessions are not planned until the day of the event, when participants can volunteer to facilitate a conversation on a topic of their choice or simply choose an idea they are interested in learning more about. Edcamps operate "without keynote speakers or vendor booths, encourage participants to find or lead a conversation that meet their needs and interests."

The first edcamp was held in May 2010 in Philadelphia. The first EdCamp participant was Andrew Marcinek. Since that time, there have been over 1,000 edcamp events held throughout the world. The Edcamp Foundation was formed in December 2011 to help teachers and other stakeholders who organize edcamps. The vision of the EdCamp Foundation is to "promote organic, participant-driven professional development for K-12 educators worldwide." The EdCamp Foundation is still located in Conshohocken, PA. The Foundation has implemented a variety of programs to help participants and organizers get the most out of EdCamp like Impact Grants, EdCamp-In-A-Box, and the Urban Initiative.

The first EdCamps that were held in languages other than English were EdCamp Stockholm on October 31, 2011 (in Swedish) and EdCamp Montreal on November 1, 2011 (in French). There has also been International EdCamps in Spain, China, Indonesia, Canada, and more.

== Gallery ==
=== EdCamp-2016 in Kharkiv, Ukraine ===
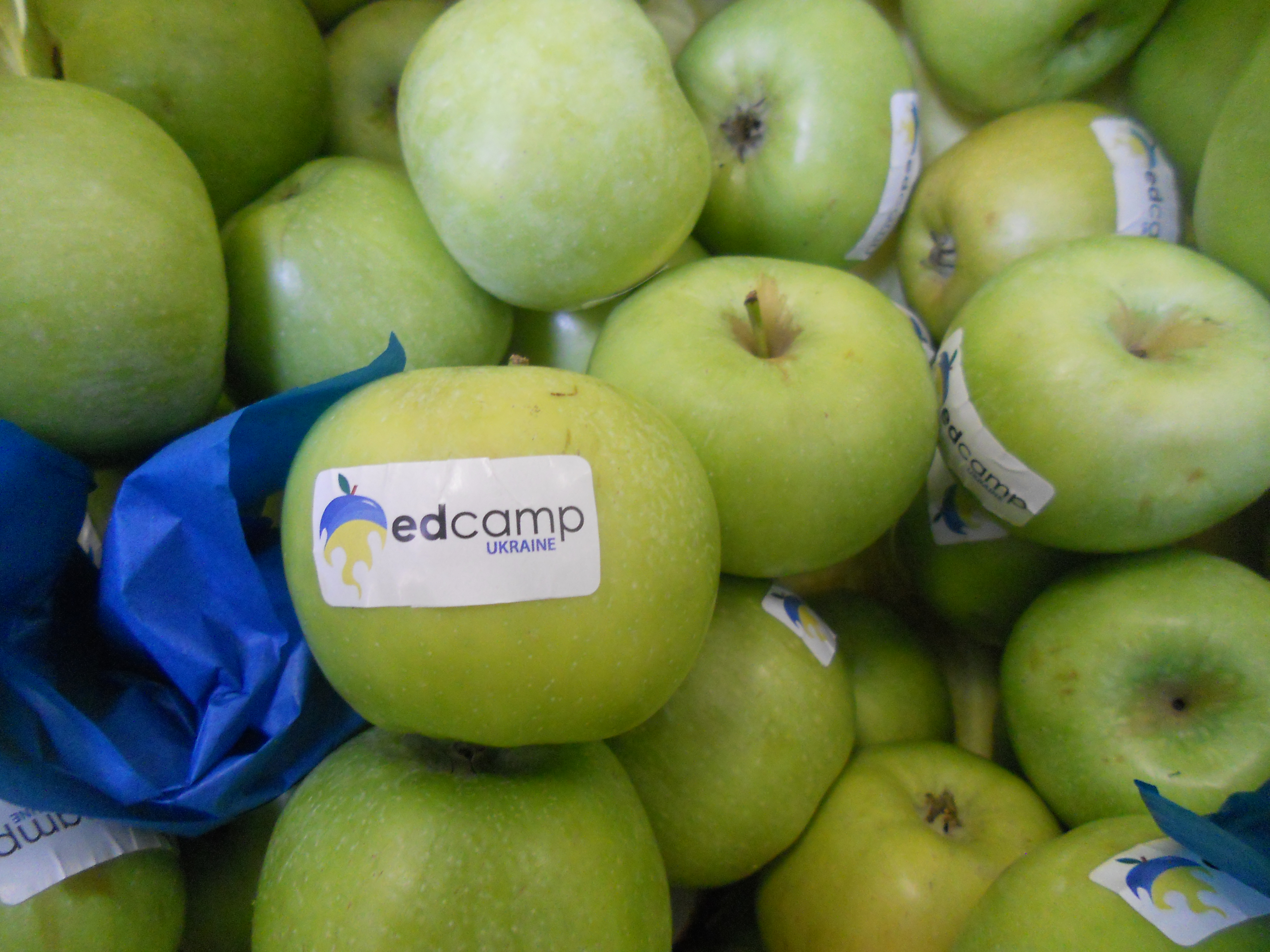
Apple, a symbol of EdCamp

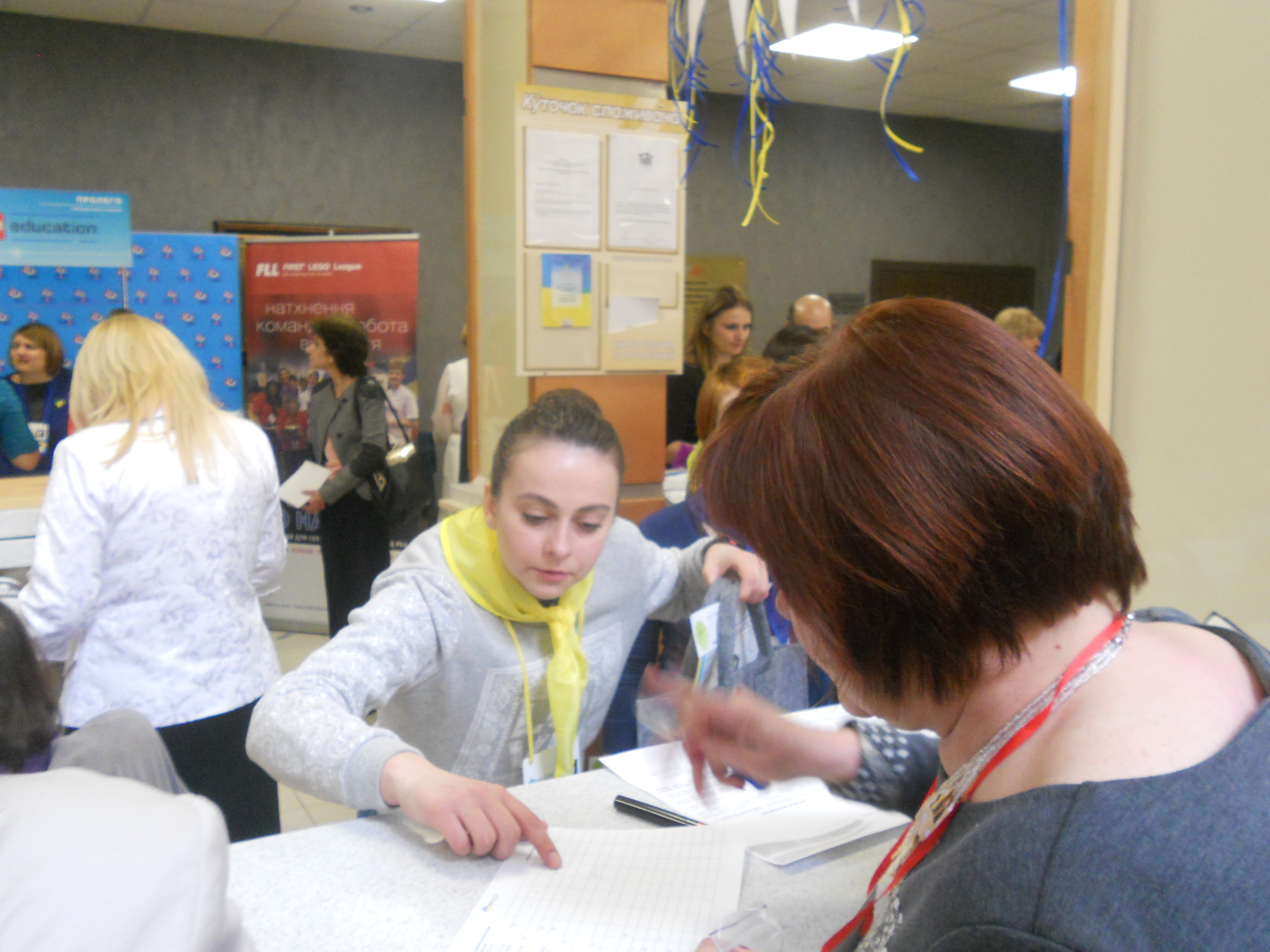
Filling out questionnaires

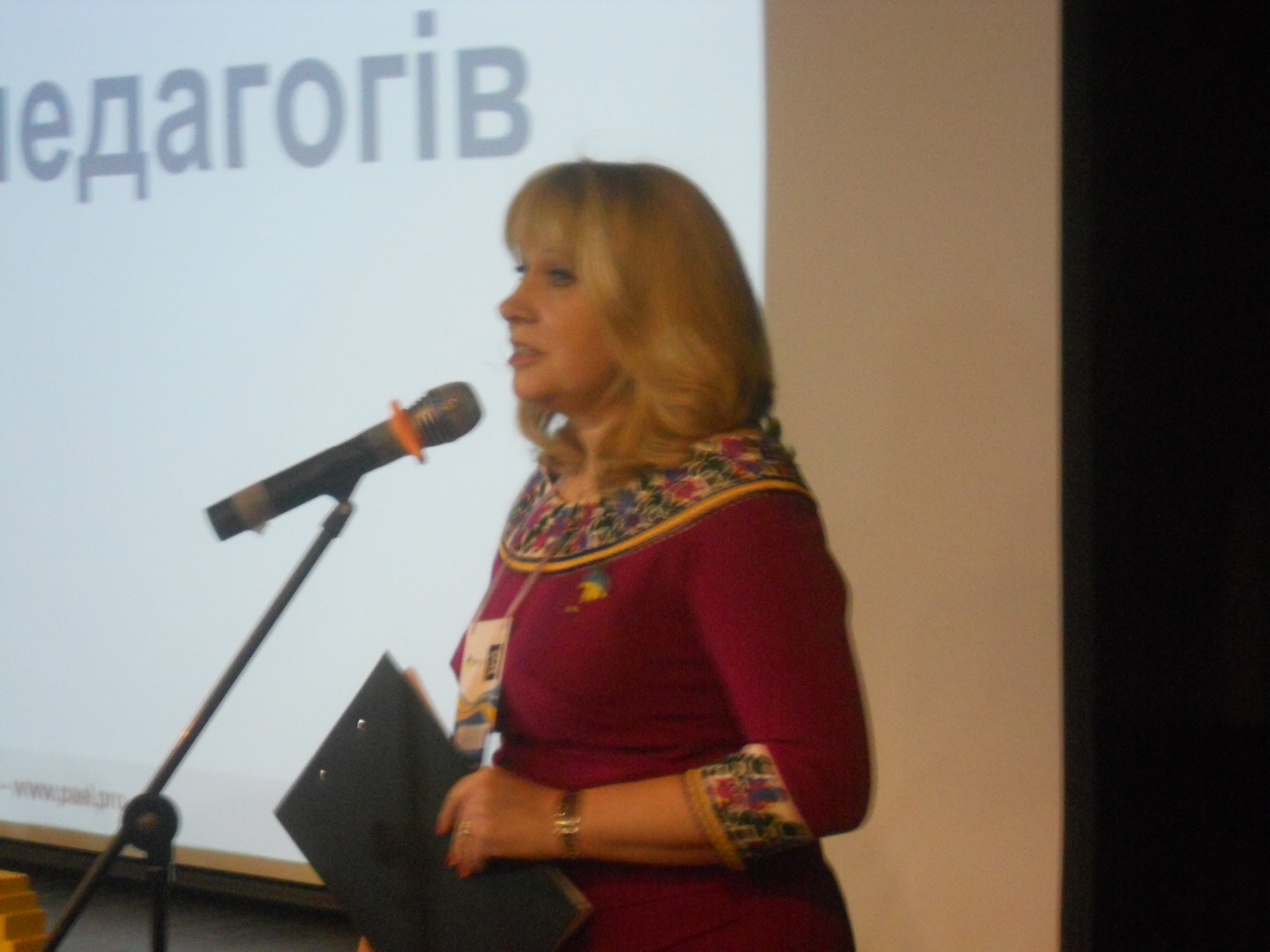
Opening of EdCamp-2016, on a stage is Maryna Paschenko

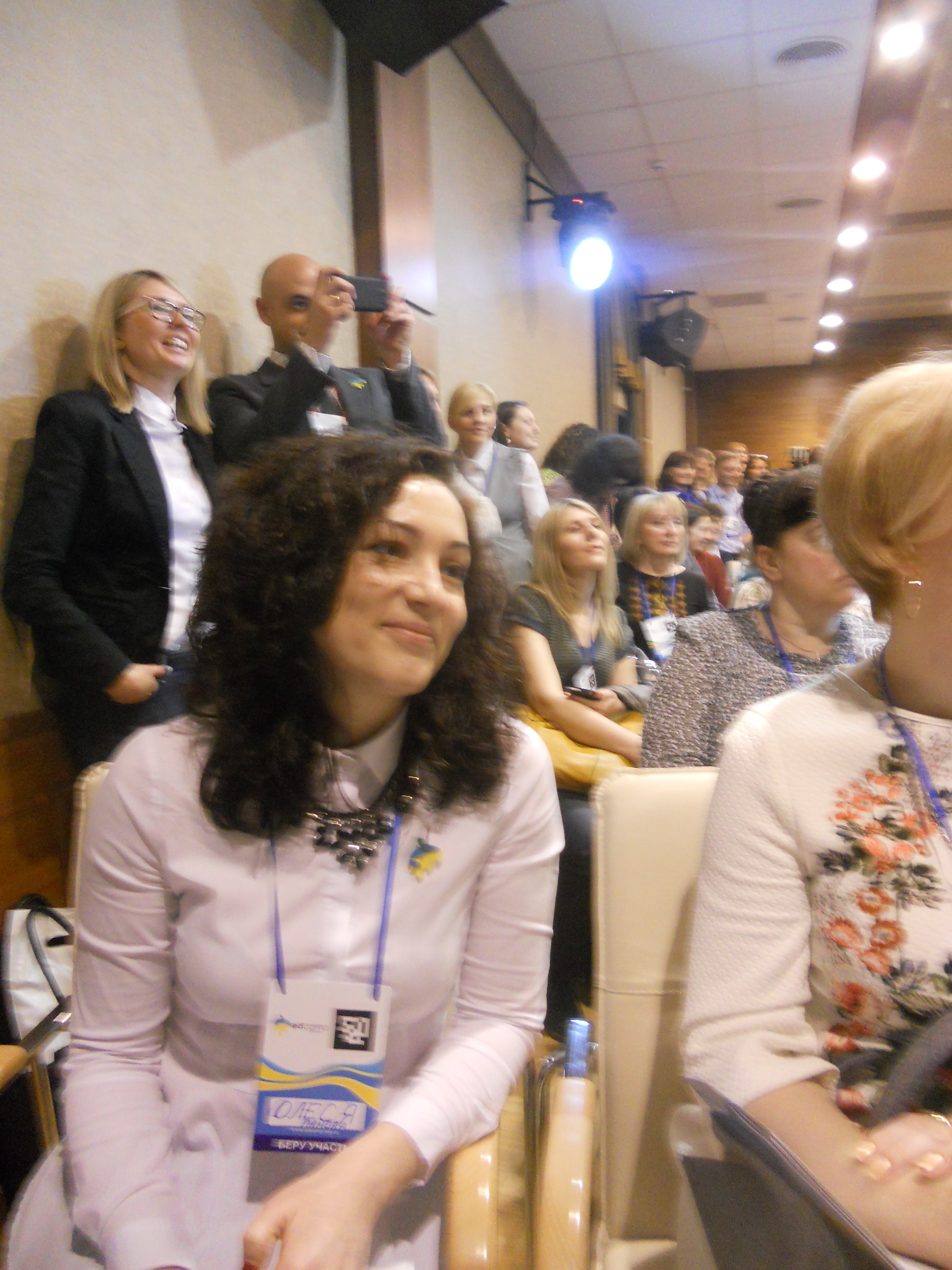
The participants on opening

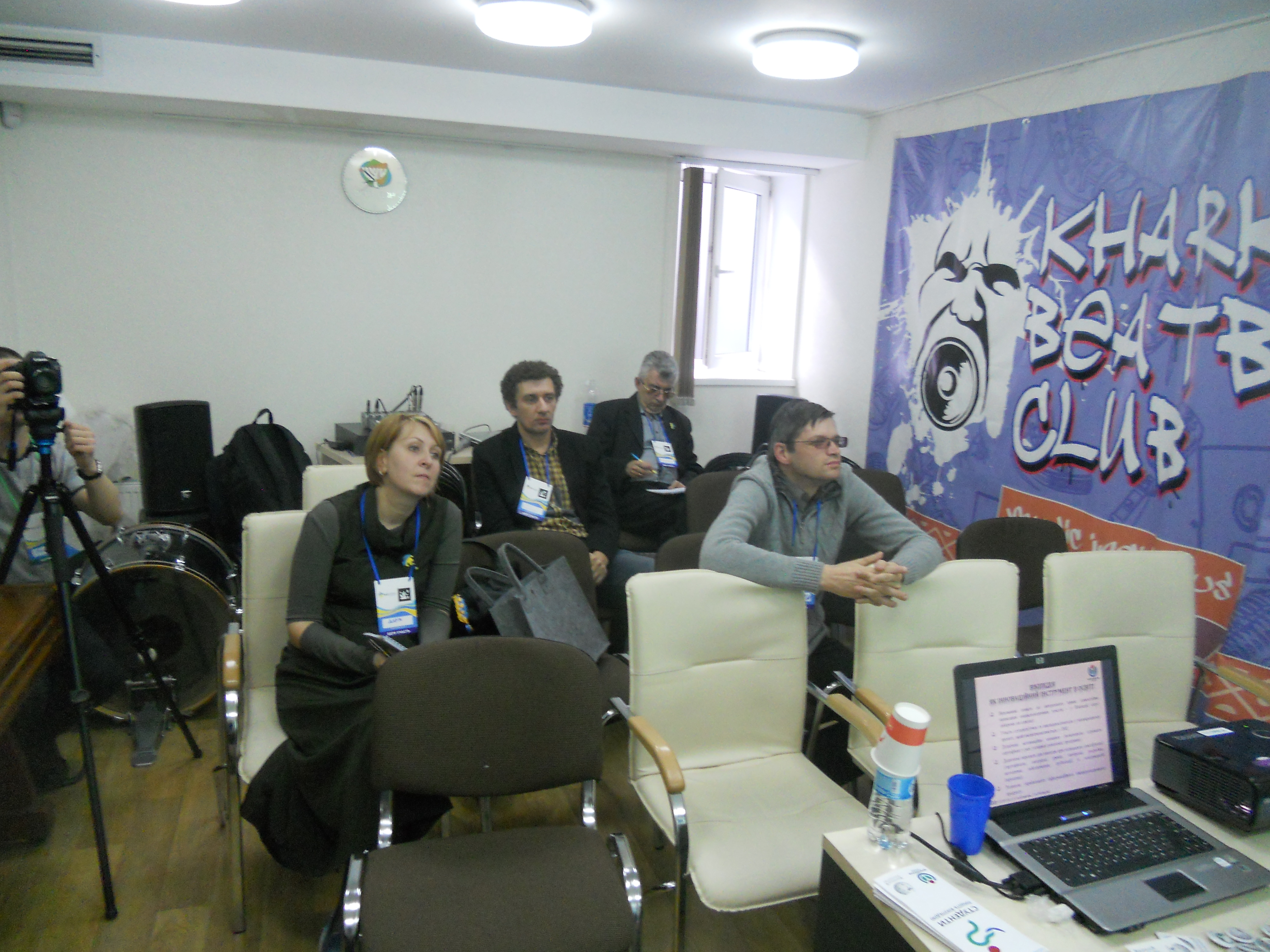
Presentation of Ukrainian Wikipedia

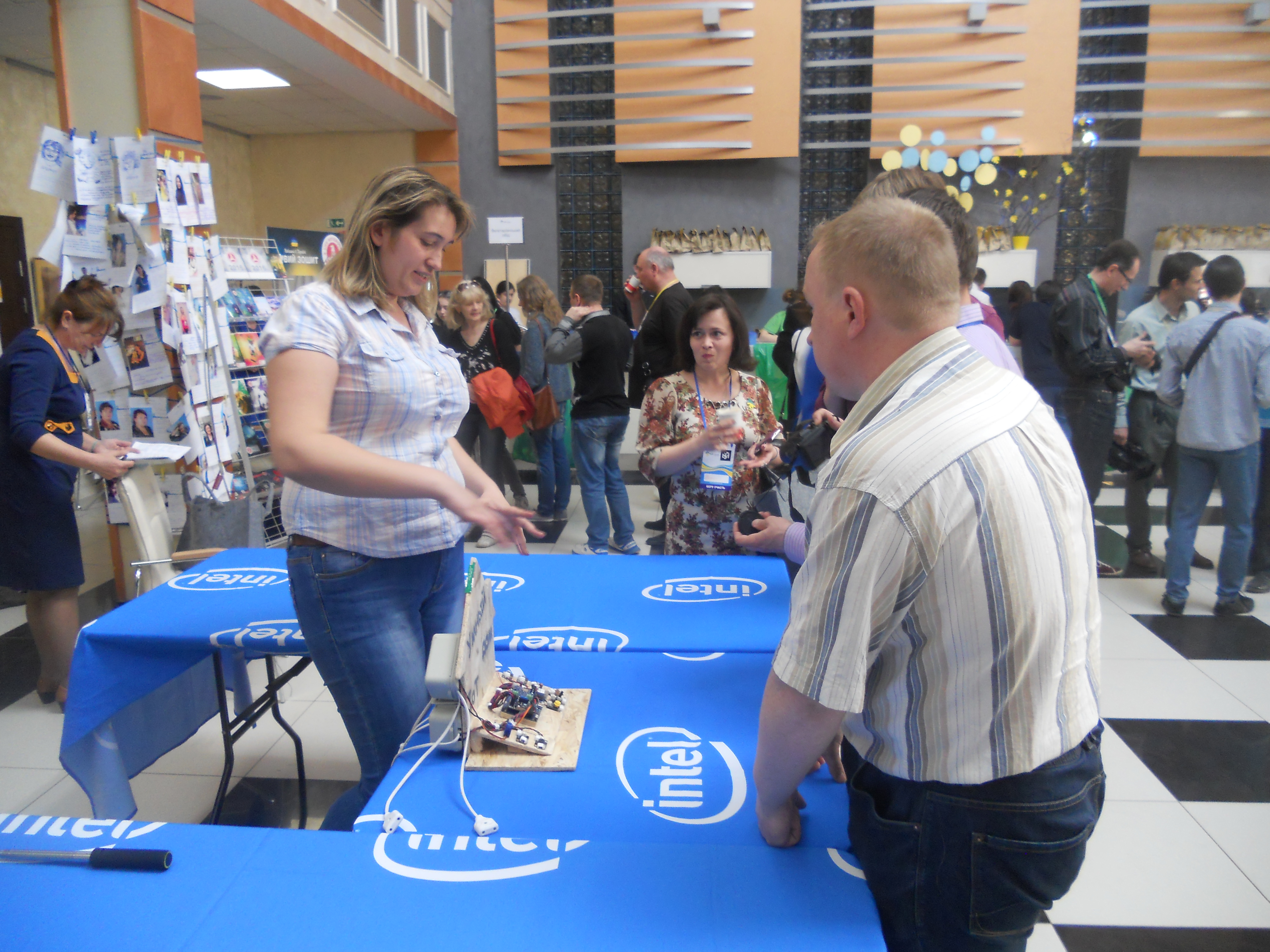
Intel, smart home

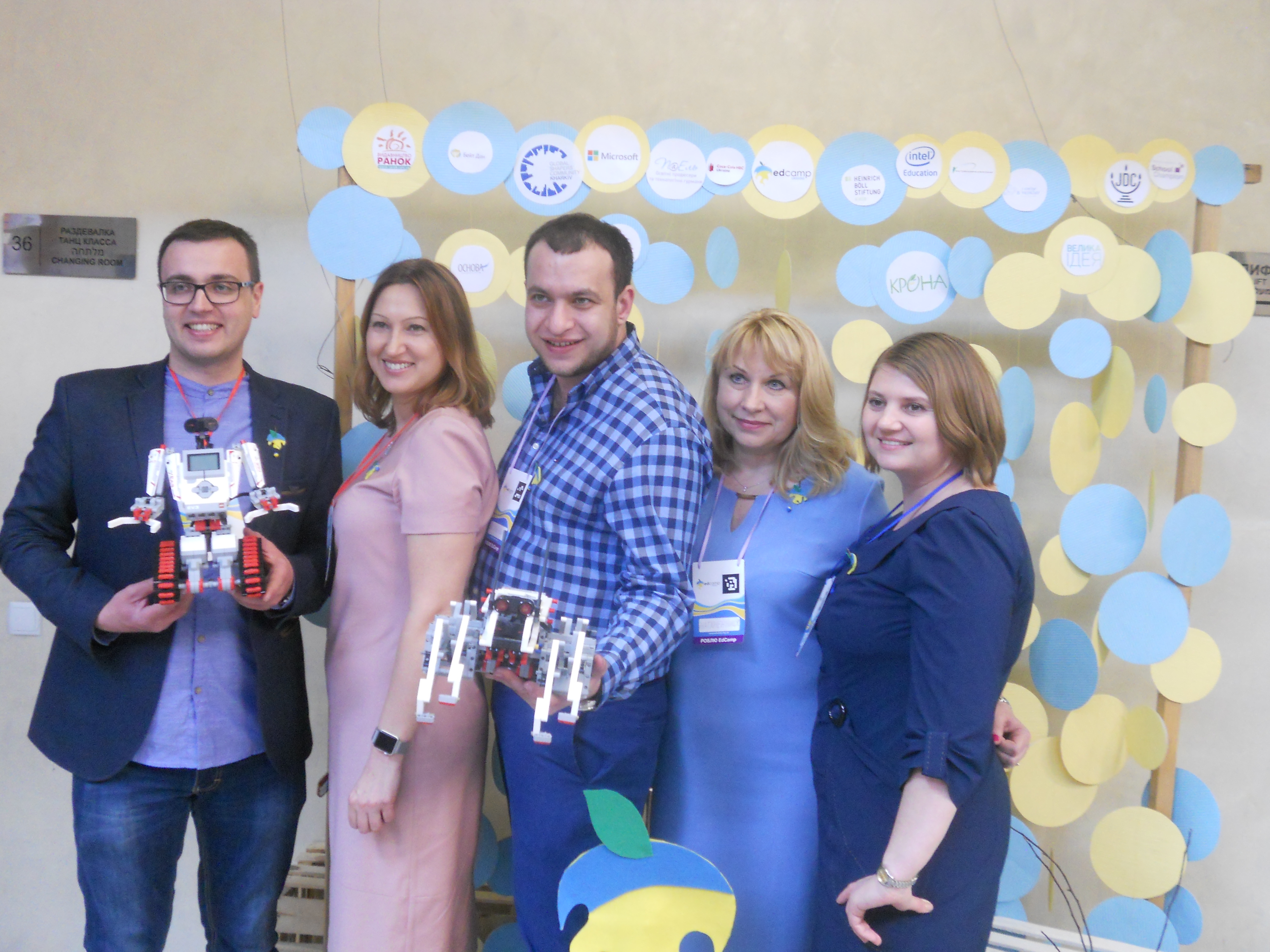
The organizers (Olexander Elkin and Maryna Paschenko) with participants

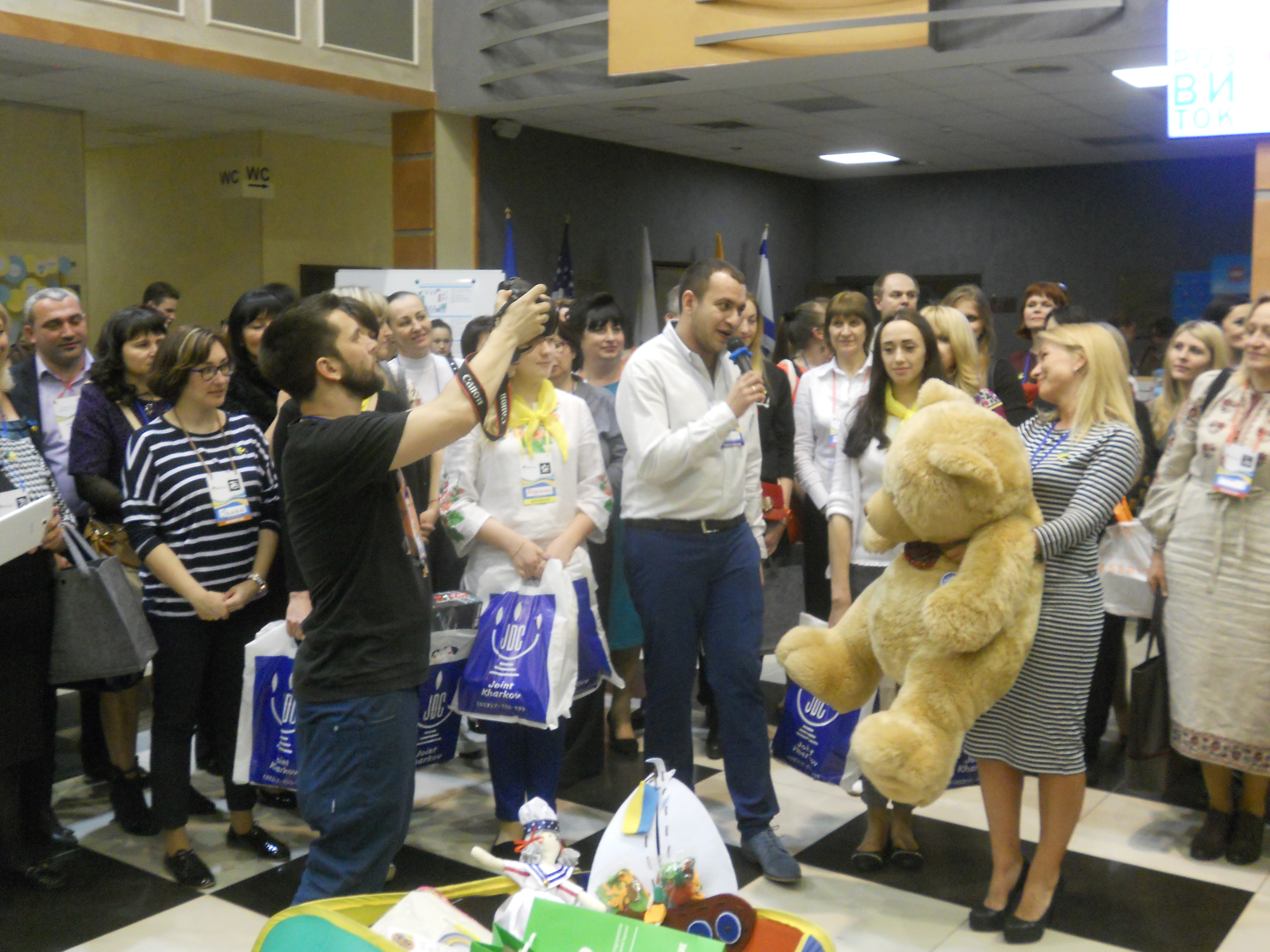
Gala dinner and entertainment program

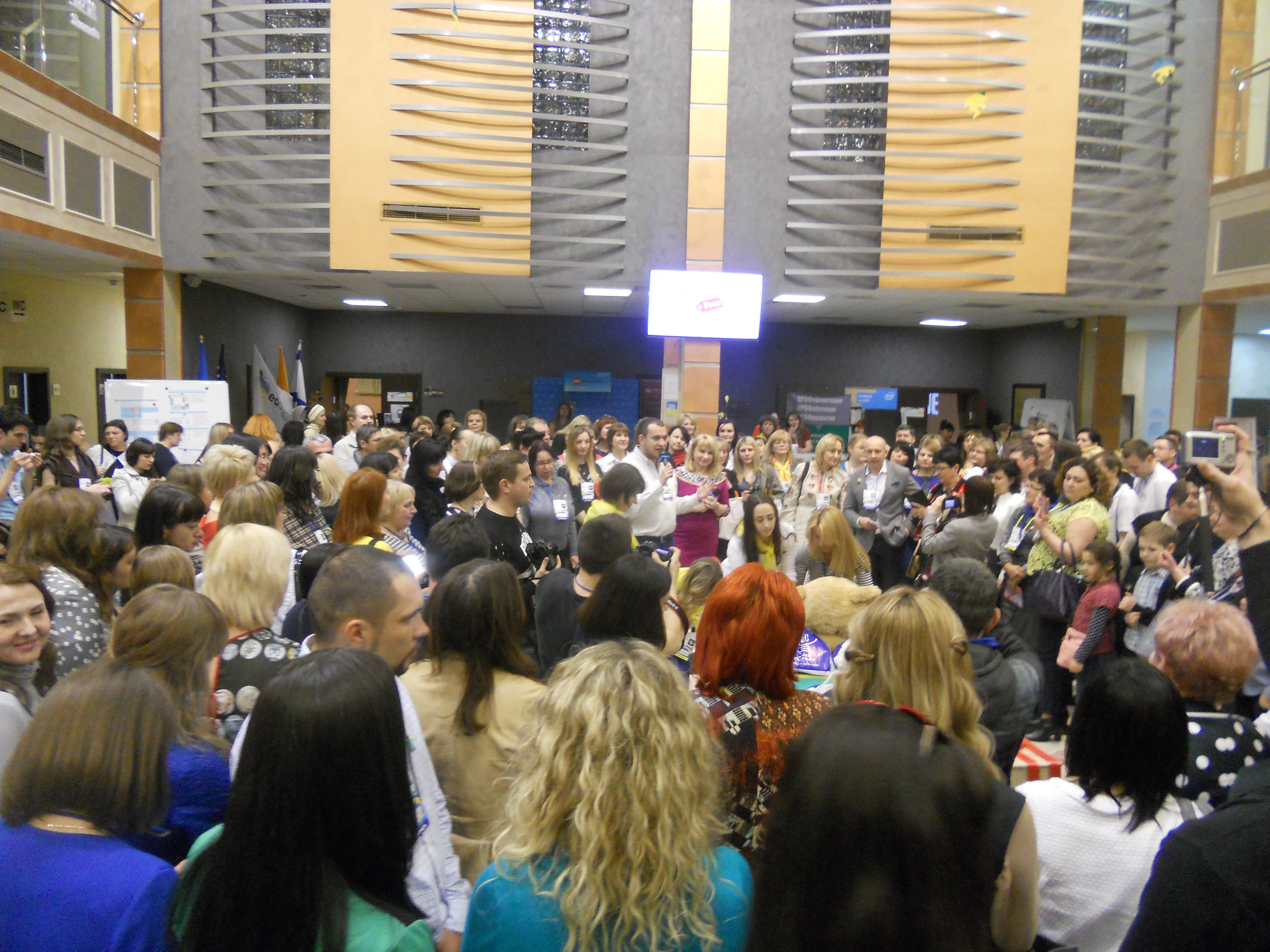
Gifts for children

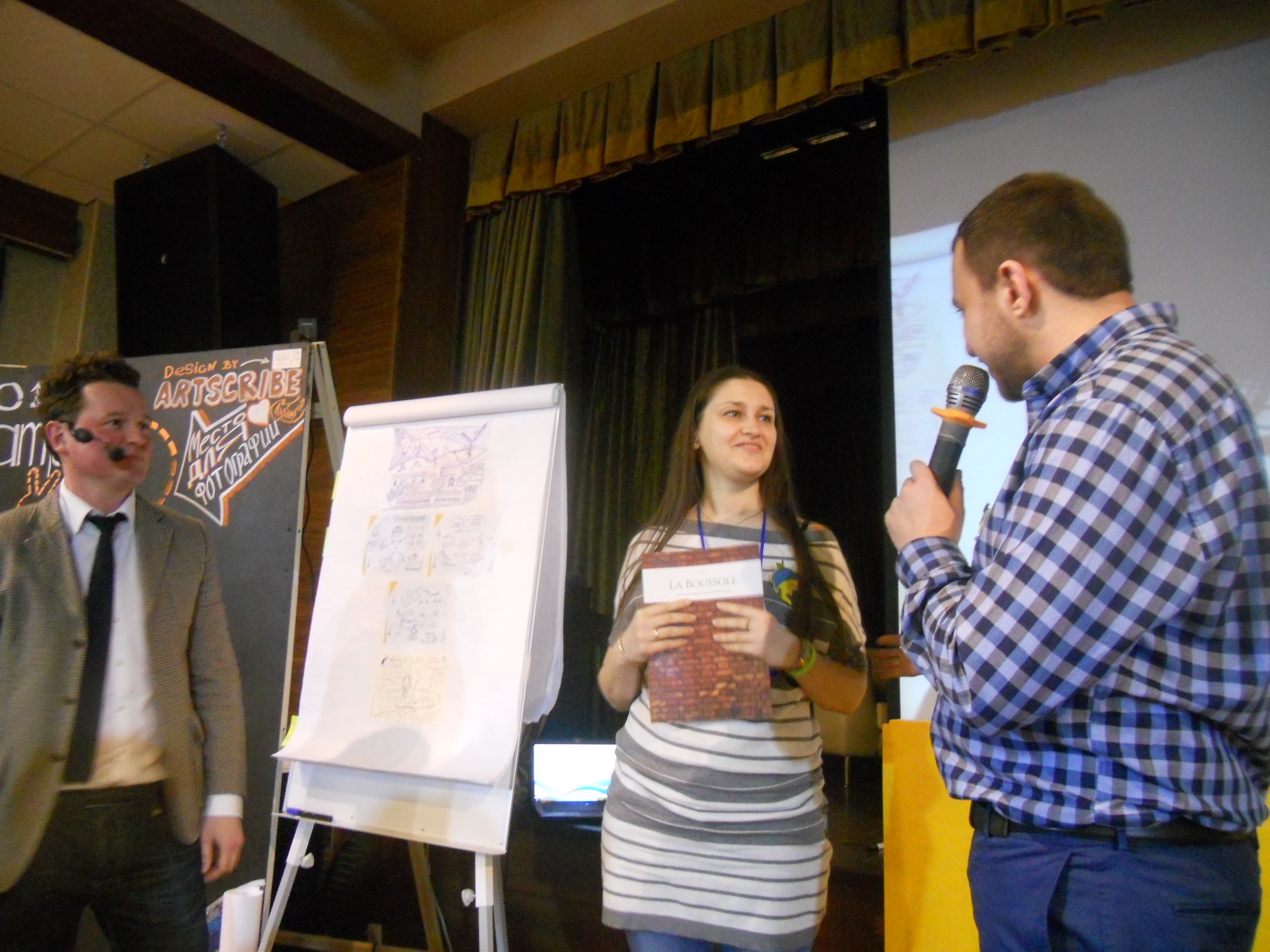
Art-scribing, winner

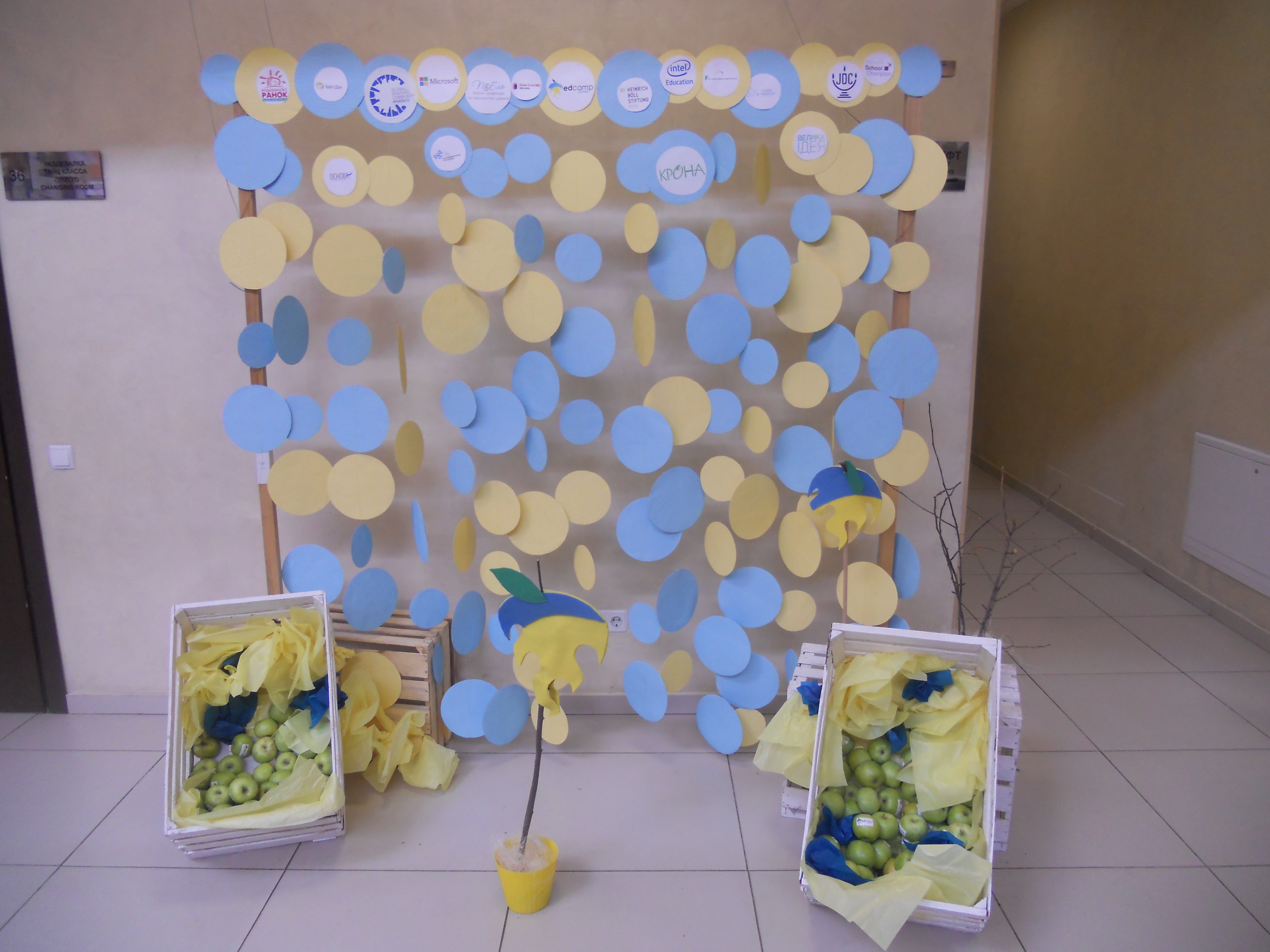
Stand with logos

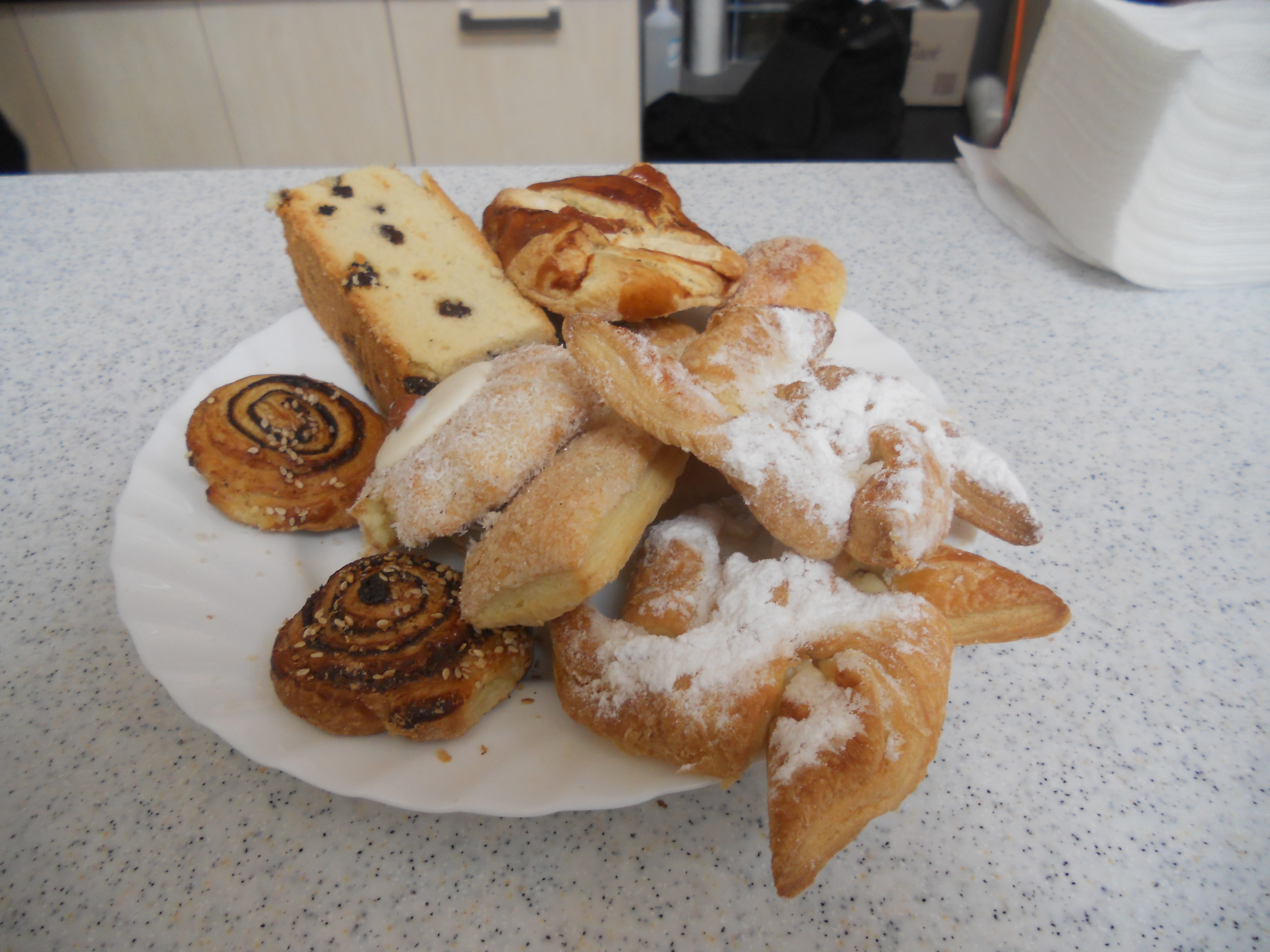
Very tasty breakfast

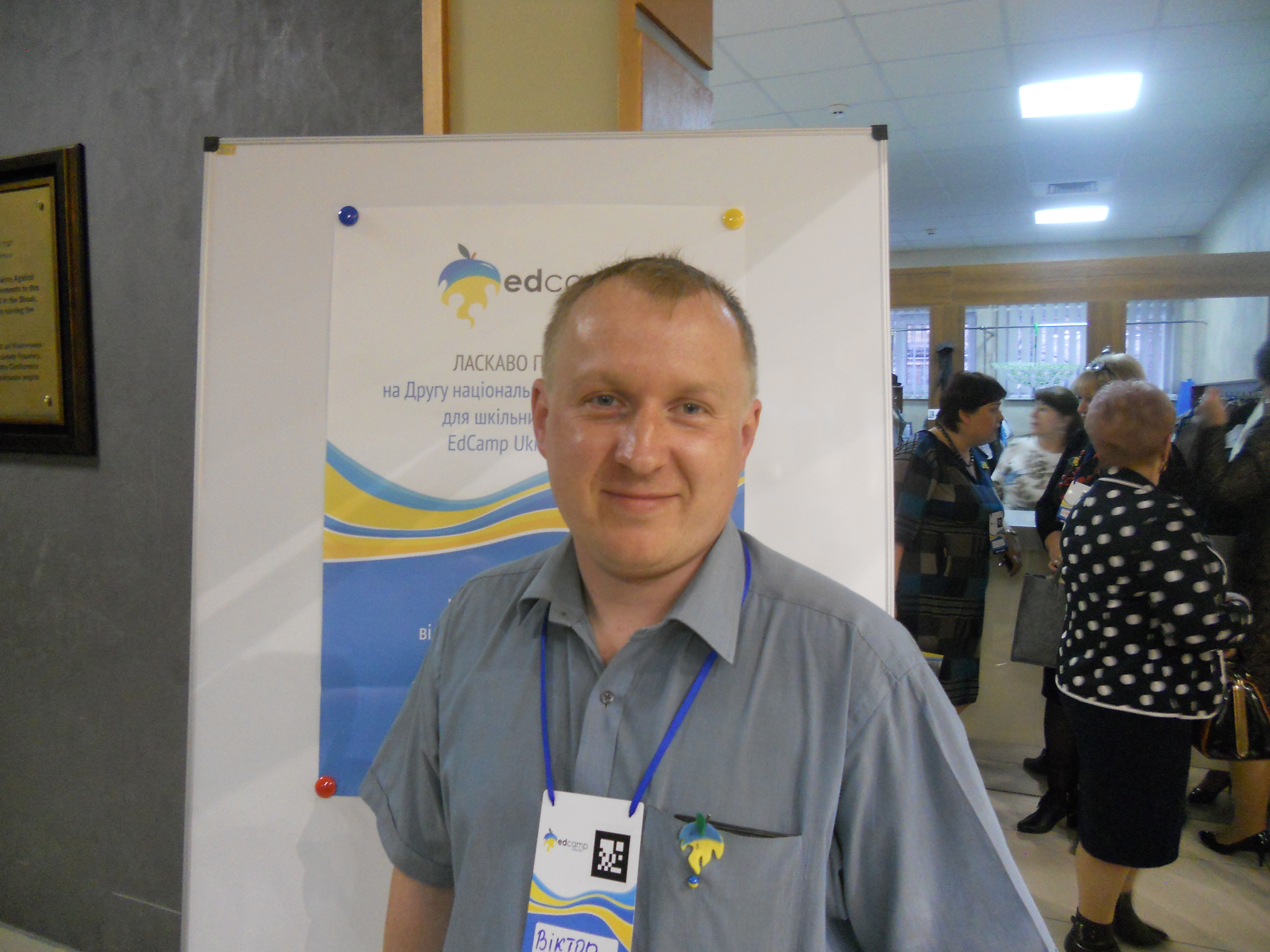
One of the participants

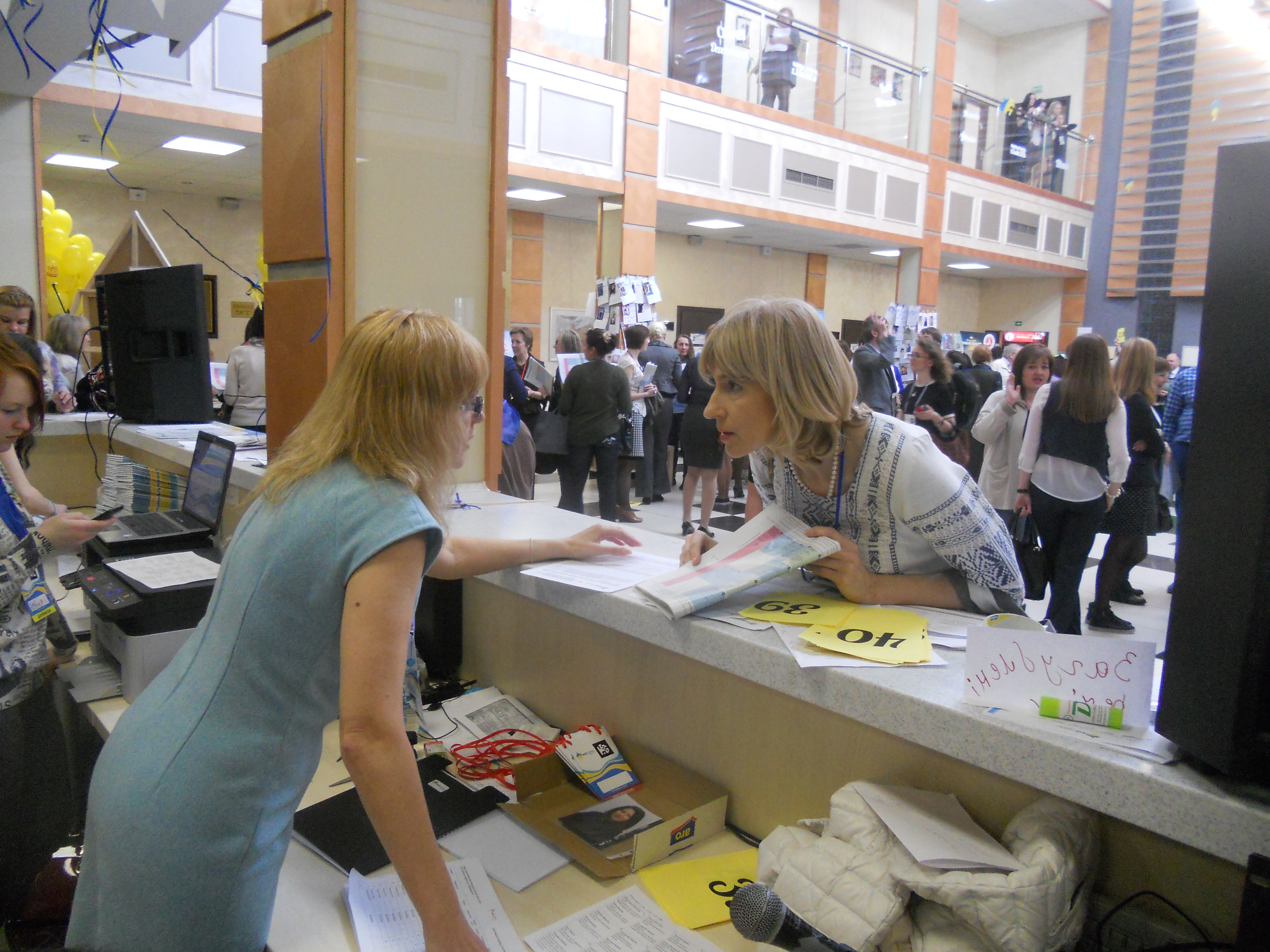
Speed geeking

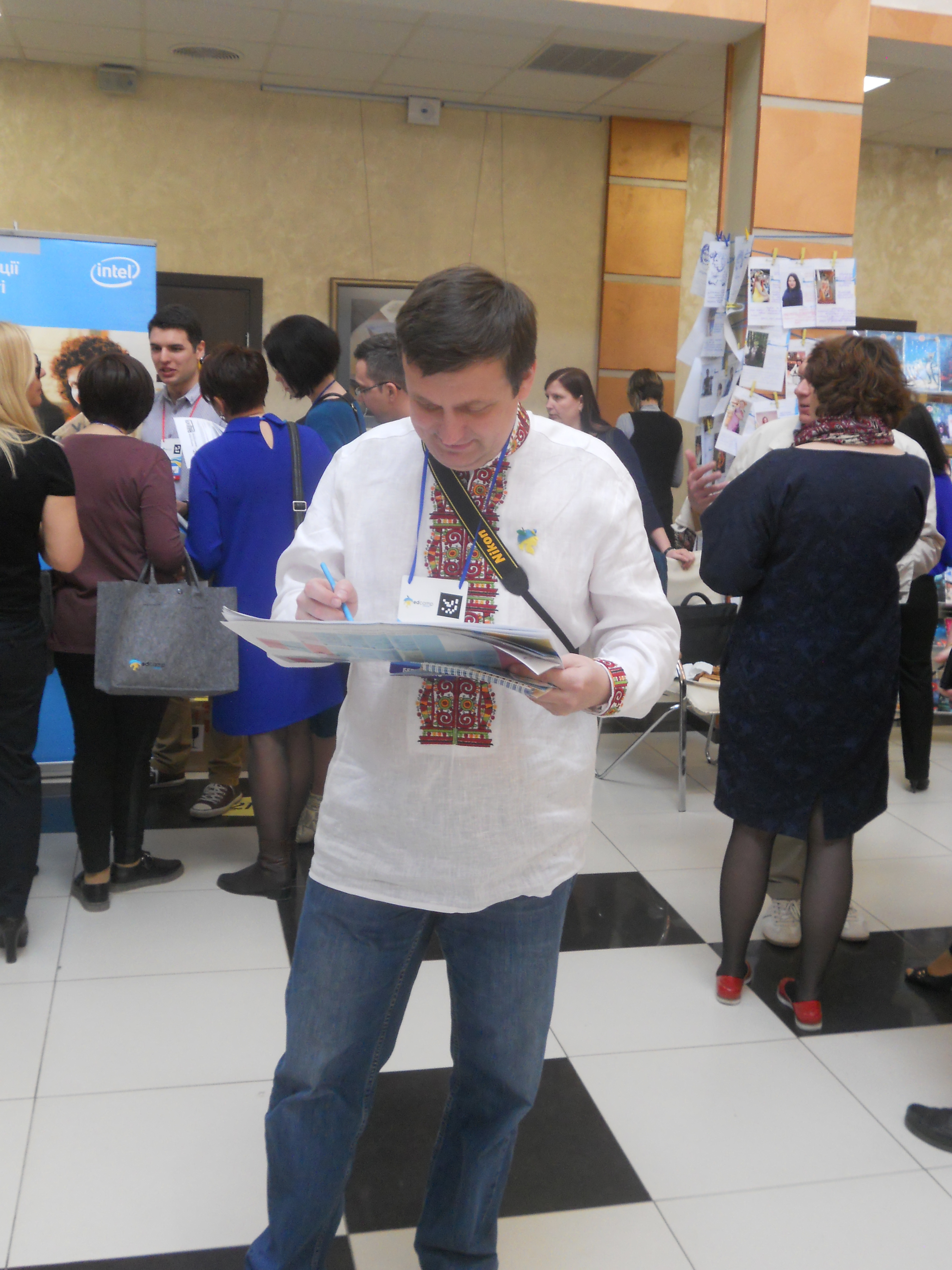
Speed geeking - where to go?

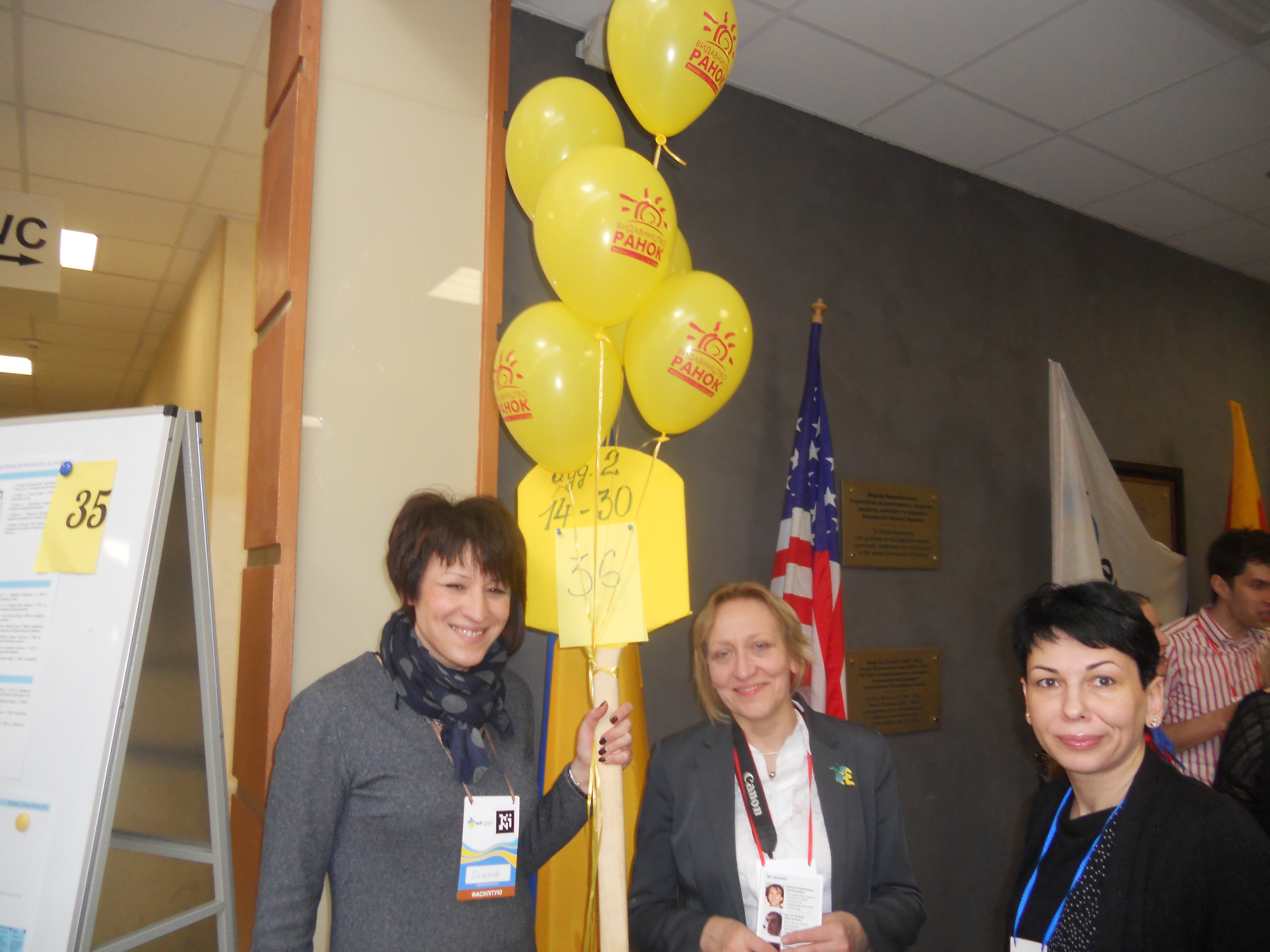
Speed geeking - the speakears

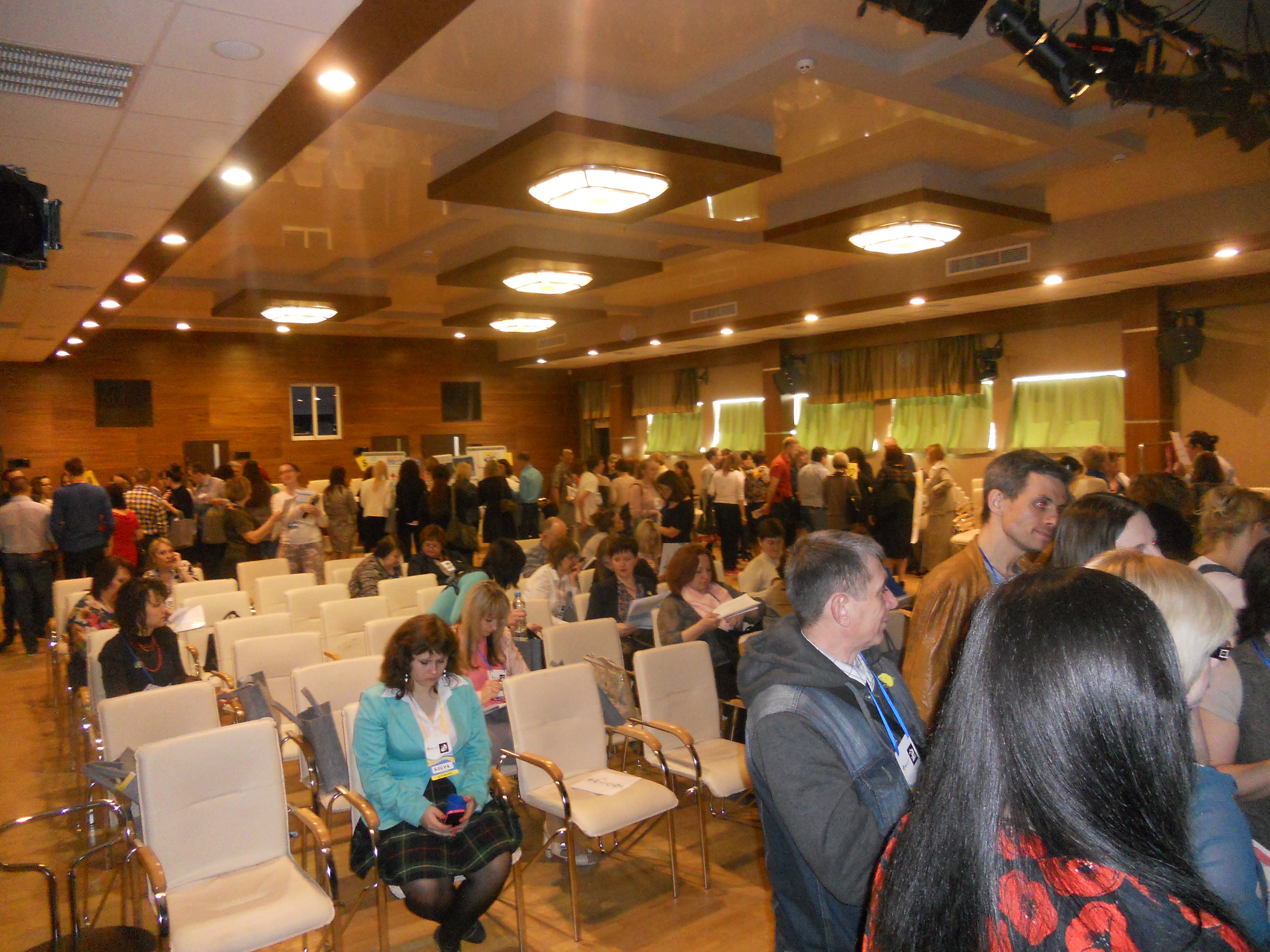
Speed geeking - continuation in the hall

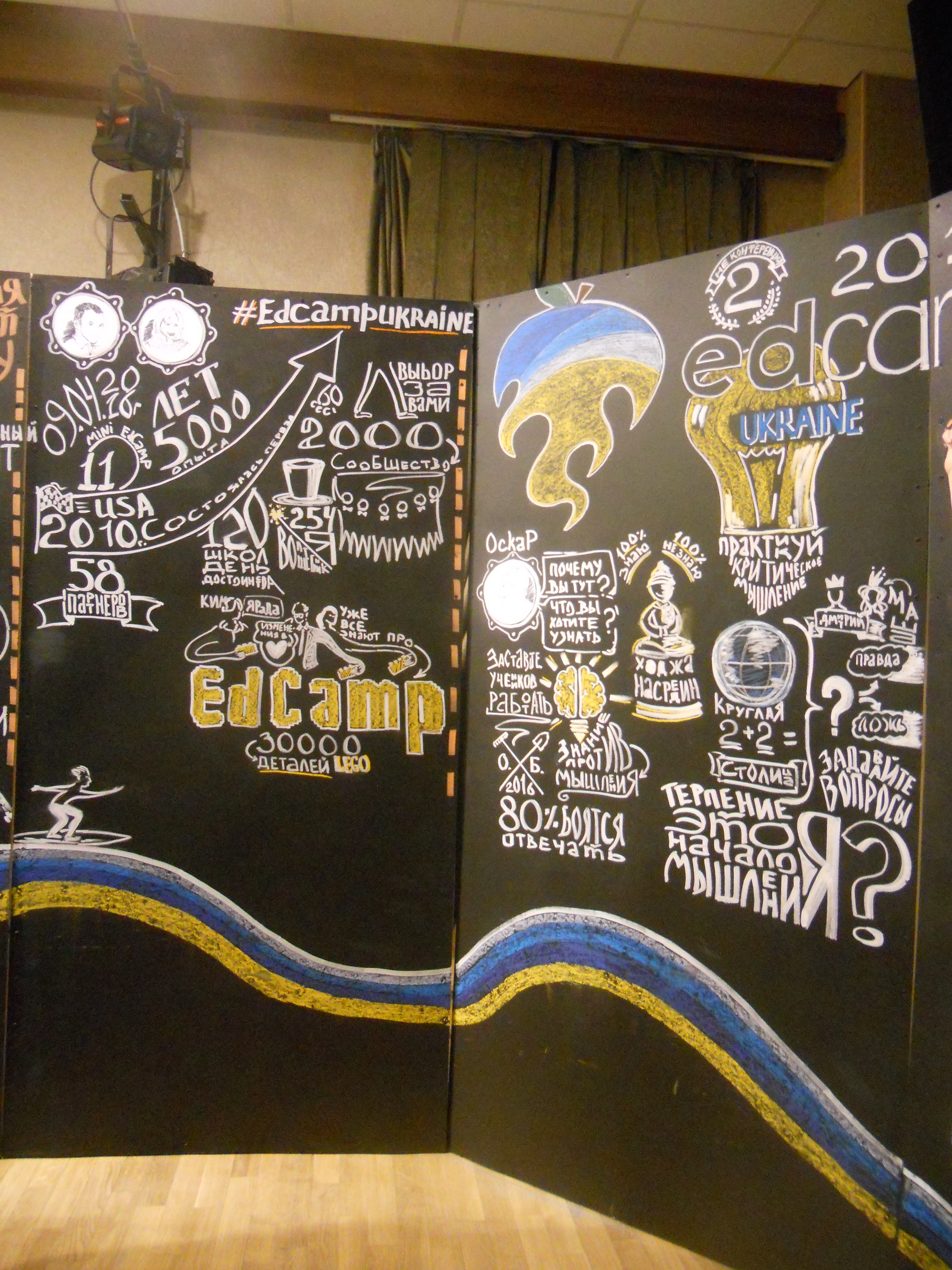
Art-scribing in the last day

=== mini-EdCamp-2016 in Cherkasy, Ukraine ===
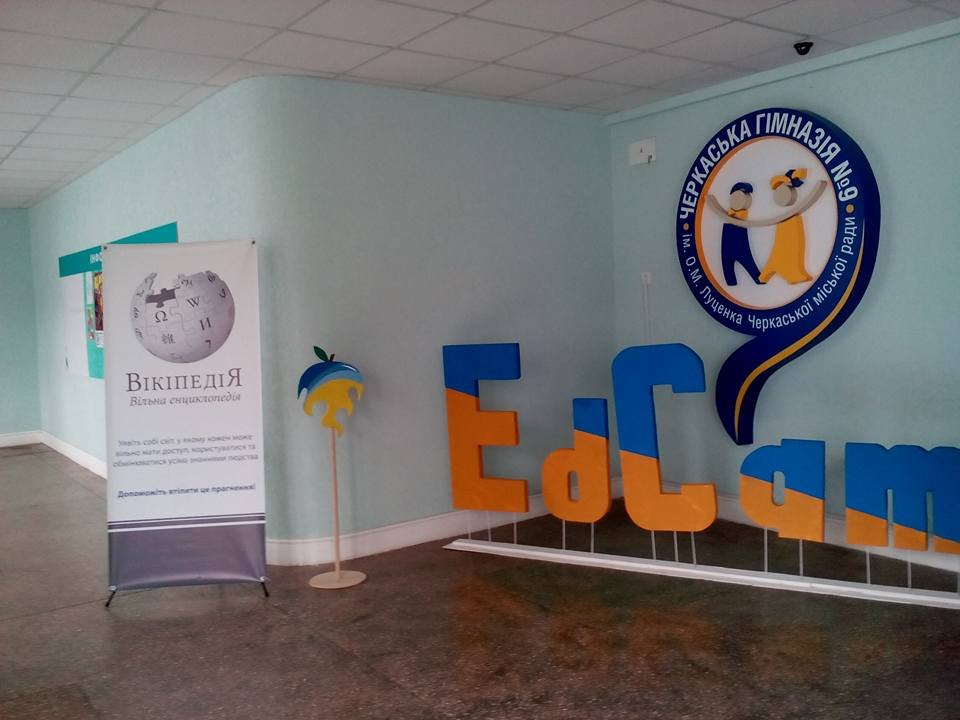
Logoes of EdCamp and Wikipedia

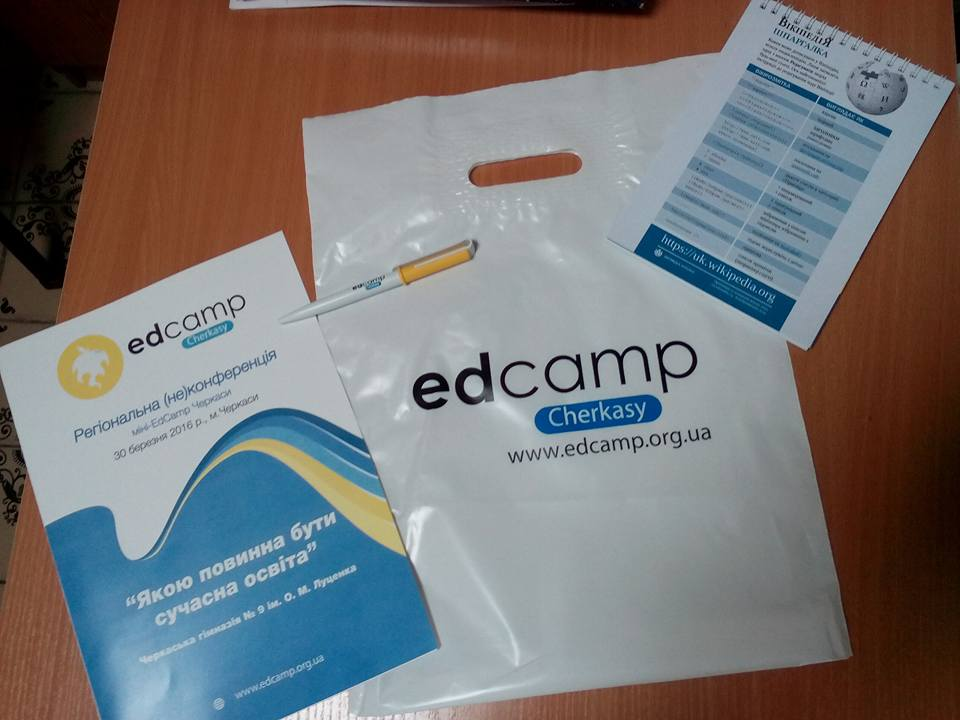
Handouts

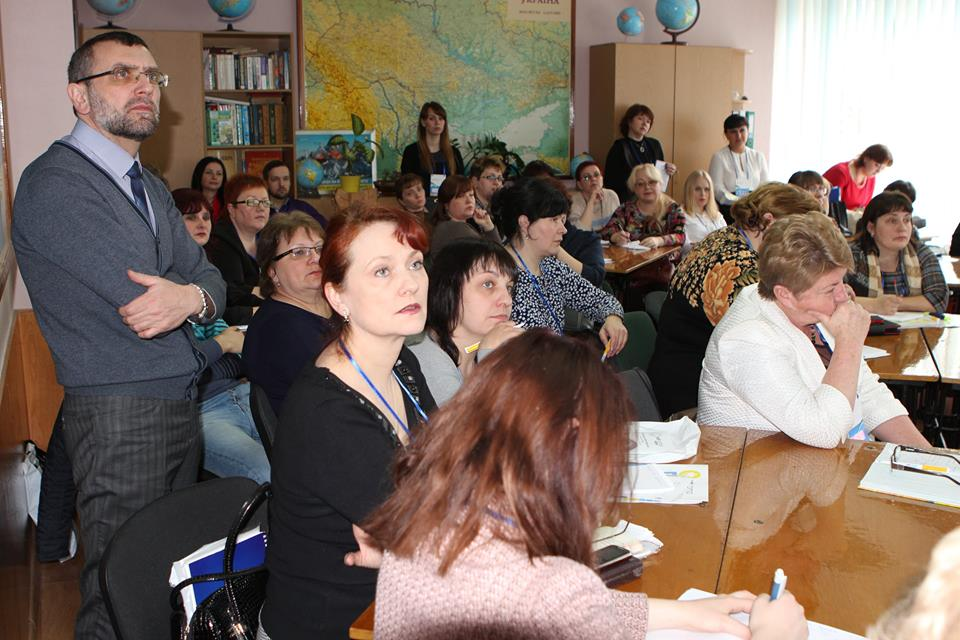
During the events
