= Andreas Schleicher =

German mathematician, statistician and researcher

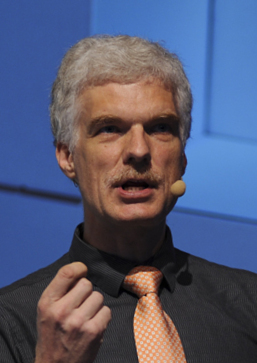
- Andreas Schleicher in 2013
- Born: July 7, 1964 (age 62)
- Education: Deakin University
- Scientific career
- Workplaces: OECD

Andreas Schleicher (born 7 July 1964) is a German mathematician, statistician and researcher in the field of education who is currently the director for education and skills, and special adviser on education policy to the secretary-general, at the Organisation for Economic Co-operation and Development (OECD) in Paris.

== Early life and education ==
When Schleicher was 10, his father removed him from the state school system and sent him to a Rudolf Steiner School in Wandsbek, Hamburg, for a Waldorf education. He achieved an average of 1.0, the top mark possible, for his school leaving certificate. He studied physics in Hamburg and then mathematics at Deakin University, where he graduated with a Master of Science degree in 1992.

== Career ==
Schleicher is the director for education and skills, and special adviser on education policy to the secretary-general, at the Organisation for Economic Co-operation and Development (OECD) in Paris.

As a key member of the OECD senior management team, Schleicher supports the secretary-general's strategy to produce analysis and policy advice that advances economic growth and social progress.

He also promotes the work of the directorate for education and skills on a global stage.

In addition to policy and country reviews, the work of the directorate includes the Programme for International Student Assessment, the OECD Survey of Adult Skills, the OECD Teaching and Learning International Survey and the development and analysis of benchmarks on the performance of education systems.

Before joining the OECD, Schleicher was director for analysis at the International Association for Educational Achievement. As of 2026 he serves as a Member of the Board of Trustees at Stiftung Lesen.

== Awards and honours ==
Schleicher is the recipient of numerous honours and awards, including the Theodor Heuss prize, awarded in the name of the first president of the Federal Republic of Germany for "exemplary democratic engagement".

In 2006, the University of Heidelberg named him an Honorary Professor in the Faculty of Behavioral and Cultural Studies.

Schleicher was named as an international fellow of the Royal Swedish Academy of Engineering Sciences (IVA) in 2020.
