= SMC =

SMC may refer to:

== Education ==
- St. Michael's College, Iligan City, Philippines
- Santa Monica College, California, US
- Sargodha Medical College, Punjab, Pakistan
- Senior Military College, any of six US colleges that offer ROTC programs
- Southwestern Michigan College, US
- Spartanburg Methodist College, South Carolina, US
- Stanley Medical College, Chennai, India
- Stewart's Melville College, Edinburgh, Scotland
- Swiss Management Center, a university in Switzerland

== Organisations ==
- IEEE Systems, Man, and Cybernetics Society
- Special Metals Corporation, an alloy manufacturer
- Supreme Muslim Council, former organization in Mandatory Palestine
- San Miguel Corporation, a Philippine conglomerate
- Samsung Medical Center, a hospital in South Korea
- Salmaniya Medical Complex, a hospital in Bahrain
- Shimla Municipal Corporation, a city's municipal government in India
- Shanghai Municipal Council, a government in Shanghai during late 19th to early 20th century
- SMC Corporation, a Japanese industrial automation company
- Social Marketing Company, a Bangladeshi non-profit organisation
- Suzuki Motor Corporation, a Japanese multinational corporation
- Swathanthra Malayalam Computing, a software collective in India
- Scottish Mountaineering Club
- Sufi Muslim Council, UK
- Singapore Mediation Centre
- Satyrs Motorcycle Club
- The Singing Machine Company, a karaoke equipment provider
- Standard Microsystems Corporation, a company acquired by Microchip Technology

== Government and politics ==
- Science Media Centre, UK press office
- Scottish Medicines Consortium, a drug approval body, a unit of Healthcare Improvement Scotland
- Space and Missile Systems Center, the research and development command of the United States Space Force
- St. Mary's County, Maryland
- Surat Municipal Corporation, Gujarat, India
- Supreme Military Council (Ghana), ruling Ghana from 1975–1979
- Modern Centre Party (Stranka modernega centra), a Slovenian political party

== Entertainment ==
- Seattle Men's Chorus, Washington, US
- SMC Recordings, San Francisco, California, US
- Shaw Multicultural Channel, a cable television channel in Vancouver, British Columbia, Canada
- Southern Media Corporation, a Cantonese television network in Guangdong, China
- Secret Maryo Chronicles, a video game

== Science and technology ==
- Seasonal malaria chemoprevention
- Sheet moulding compound or sheet moulding composite, a reinforced polyester material
- Small Magellanic Cloud, a galaxy near the Milky Way
- SMC protein (Structural Maintenance of Chromosomes)
- Supplementary motor cortex, a part of the sensorimotor cortex
- Smooth muscle cell, a cell of involuntary non-striated muscle
- Symmetric monoidal category, a mathematical structure involving serial and parallel composition

=== Computing and electronics ===
- Sound and music computing
- Apple SMC, a video codec
- Secure multi-party computation, a cryptography problem
- Sequential Monte Carlo method, a set of algorithms
- Self-modifying code, code which modifies itself at load or runtime
- Sliding mode control, in control theory
- SMC connector, used in radio-frequency circuits
- Surface-mount component, in electronics
- Super Mini Comboy, the Super Game Boy peripheral released in South Korea that allows Game Boy cartridges to be played on a Super Nintendo Entertainment System console
- .smc, a file format used for Super Nintendo Entertainment System ROM images
- System Management Controller, on Apple computers
- DO-214AB, a variant of DO-214 semiconductor package

== Other uses ==
- Semarang Poncol railway station, Semarang, Indonesia (station code: SMC)
- Serbia and Montenegro Cup
- Senior Mathematical Challenge, for students run by the United Kingdom Mathematics Trust
- Single-member constituency
- Speak Mandarin Campaign, Singapore
- Stade Malherbe Caen, a French football club
