= Minus-One recordings =

Multitrack mixes with muted lead vocal tracks

In the Philippines, the Minus-One (commonly, albeit improperly, spelled "minus one" without the hyphen) is a variant mix of a multi-track recording, wherein the lead vocal track of a song is muted for further use. In the Philippine recording industry of the 1980s, during the heyday of vinyl records, this variant was released as the "flip side" of a commercial song's 7-inch single, but generally never a part of the Long Playing album containing the full-featured song. Succinctly, a B-side selection became referred to as "minus-one" because the lead vocal track is subtracted from the A-Side song's original mix.

The Minus-One is the patented name of the "Sing-Along System" karaoke machine invented by Filipino business executive Roberto del Rosario in 1975. The term and the idea of records without vocals can be traced back to the Music Minus One company in the 1950s.

== Record production genre ==
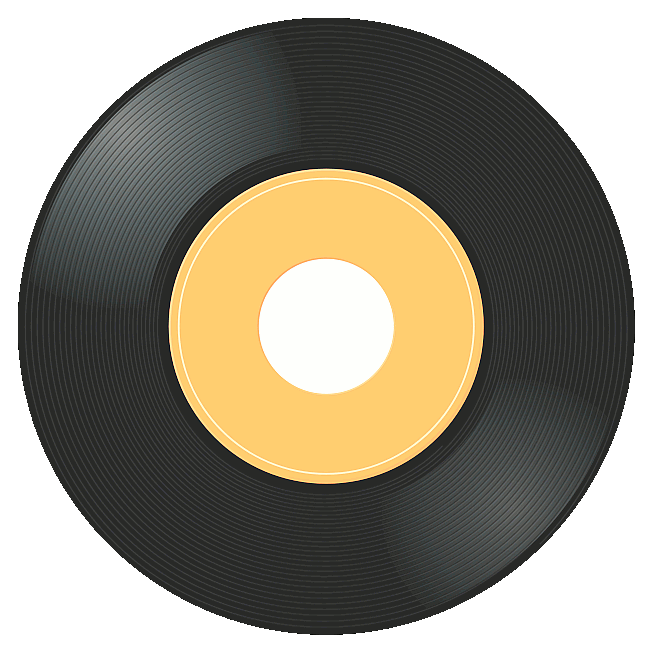
45 RPM 7-inch vinyl

As a genre of record production in the Philippines, the inclusion of a 'minus-one' Side-B reduced the production cost of a 45 RPM 7-inch "single" by foregoing the need for yet another song to occupy the 7-inch record's flip side. It also encouraged buyers to "sing along" with the bonus accompaniment of the "hit single".

A "minus-one mix" would not necessarily be wholly instrumental, as backing vocals of the song's original mix may be retained. The concept of instrumental B-sides to complement their full versions became a production trend of the Philippine record industry of the 1980s, which was replicated overseas. In the ensuing years, tracks from minus-one flip sides were assembled by production houses for their inclusion in compilations.

== Examples of minus-one sides ==
The following table illustrates early B-sides of Zsa Zsa Padilla's 45-RPM 7" Vinyl singles released by Blackgold Records. Many such vinyl sides have since been ported to other platforms, including VCD, videoke and free video sharing websites.

Side A song	Side B minus-one	Catalog	Year
When I'm With You (Rene Novelles)	When I'm With You (minus-one) (Arranged by Dante Trinidad)	BSP-392	1985
Eversince (Alvina Eileen Sy)	Eversince (minus-one) (Arranged by Dante Trinidad)	BSP-397	1985
To Love You (Danny Javier)	To Love You (minus-one) (Arranged by Menchu Apostol)	BSP-401	1985
Hiram (George Canseco)	Hiram (minus-one) (Arranged by Danny Tan)	BSP-404	1986
Mambobola (Rey-An Fuentes)	Mambobola (minus-one) (Arranged by Homer Flores)	BSP-410	1986
Ikaw Lamang (Dodjie Simon)	Ikaw Lamang (minus-one) (Arranged by Menchu Apostol)	BSP-413	1986
Minsan Pa (Jun Sta. Maria & Peewee Apostol)	Minsan Pa (minus-one) (Arranged by Menchu Apostol)	BSP-417	1986
Maybe This Time (Marlene del Rosario)	Maybe This Time (minus-one) (Arranged by Menchu Apostol)	BSP-432	1988
Pangako (Dodjie Simon)	Pangako (minus-one) (Arranged by Egay Gonzales)	BSP-447	1990
Ang Aking Pamasko (Tony Velarde)	Ang Aking Pamasko (minus-one) (Arranged by Egay Gonzales)	BSP-459	1990

=== Other examples ===
- In 1987, the song "Enveloped Ideas" by Filipino band the Dawn was released as a 7-inch 45 RPM single (with minus-one) by their record label, OctoArts.
- In the 2000s, Filipino band Narda featured an album page in AllMusic with dedicated minus-one content.

== Minus-one is content, not equipment ==

The wave of "Minus-One" vinyl B-sides brought about a genre in the Philippine record industry, harvested by the cousins Vic del Rosario and Orly Ilacad, co-owners and executive producers of Vicor Music Corporation and its offshoot record labels. They released the seminal 7-inch B-sides of minus-one recordings, later grouped together as minus-one compilations on cassette tape format, compact disc and later as online material.

As sheer musical content, the instrumentals were a precursor to widespread recreational crooning at home and outside, its provenance effectively traced to the Music Minus One products of the mid-1950s. In 1975, Filipino executive Roberto del Rosario patented his sing-along invention as Minus-One, popularly known as the karaoke machine, an interactive entertainment system without vocals. As a Filipino trait for festivity, the allure for minus-one recordings crossed cultural barriers in the Philippines.

== See also ==
- Karaoke
