= Keumyoung Group =

South Korean electronics company

KY Entertainment KY (주)금영엔터테인먼트
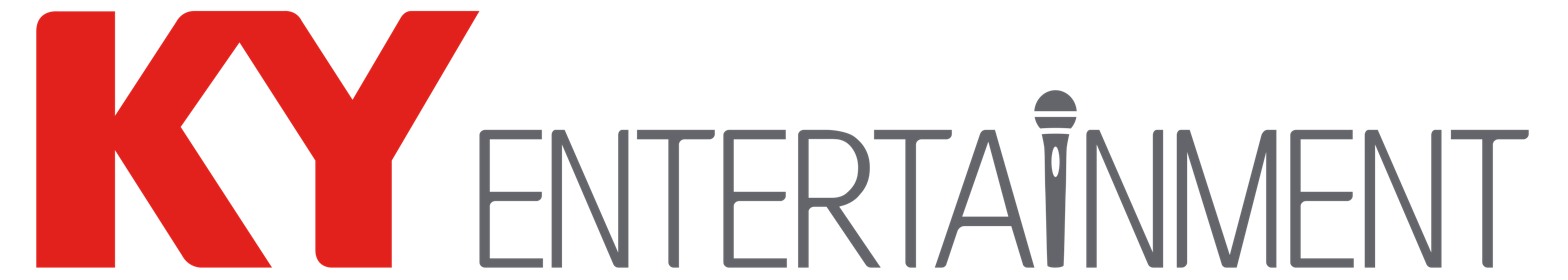
- Industry: Music, Entertainment, Karaoke
- Founded: 1983; 43 years ago in Busan, South Korea
- Headquarters: Seoul, South Korea
- Area served: South Korea
- Key people: Kim JinKab (CEO)
- Products: Electronics, Karaoke
- Revenue: ▲US$54 million (60 trillon KRW) (2006)
- Number of employees: 110 people (regular staffs); 30 free-lancers in sound-engineering lab (2005)
- Website: www.kyentertainment.kr

KY Entertainment (Korean: (주)금영엔터테인먼트, Hanja: 金永, Originally Kumyoung) is a Korean company based in Seoul, South Korea. Its main areas of business are manufacturing of computer music player and audio system, digital music content.

== History ==
Kumyoung was first established as Namkyoung Industry, a manufacturer of video game arcade machine in Busan, South Korea in August 1983. The firm's name was changed to Kumyoung Industry in 1986 and later to Kumyoung Co. Ltd. in 1989 with the inauguration of Kim Sung Young as its CEO. The company focused on the production of karaoke system and has dominated the Korean Noraebang (노래방) industry and the export markets since the early 90s. In 1996, Kumyoung introduced and patented the world's first HDD-based computer music player with real human voice chorus recording by a TV station.

The company headquarters was moved to Seoul in 2002. It ventured into digital music production in 2003 with the establishment of its affiliate, Square-One Music and mobile phone content services in partnership with some Korean telecom companies. Kumyoung has diversified its core business by offering on-line internet noraebang and Video-on-demand services.

Kumyoung group changed its name to KY Entertainment in 2018.

=== Milestones ===
- 1989 Establishment and registration of Keum Young Entertainment Co., Ltd
- 1991 Released music accompaniment computer software
- 1994 Established Beijing Office (Concluded Thailand sales agent contract)
- 1995 Established US Branch Office in 1995 (Consecutive No.1 in Korean market for home karaoke systems)
- 1996 Launched the first <Vocal Chorus> karaoke system in the world and maintained No.1 ranking in Korea ever since
- 1999 Designated as a company with excellent technological competitiveness (acquired CE mark)
- 2003 Established joint venture in China and concluded export contract for HDD & DVD music accompaniment products with Vietnamese company
- 2005 Launched the first cable TV interactive music service technology in the world (currently in operation with CJ, LG Korean cable broadcasting service)
- 2007 Established Japan Branch Office; started exports to Japan: Concluded export contract with Japan BMB (started exporting track finders)
- 2008 Owned 22 domestic trademarks and 30 domestic patents for karaoke
- 2009 Designated as one of the top 10 million dollar exporters
- 2010 Released KMS-A100/a50, feel TONG 600
- 2011 Released KMS-A300
- 2012 Released KMS-K95 series
- 2013 Adopted new song update method using smartphones
- 2014 Released KMS-Q100, Q200 series
- 2015 Released KMS-Q300N
- 2016 Acquired Keum Young Group karaoke business
- 2017 Launched sales and management device for coin-operated karaoke
- 2018 Changed corporate name to KY Entertainment
- 2019 Launched the first AI karaoke service in Korea, KT GiGA Genie Premium Keum Young Karaoke Service

== Products ==
- Computer Music Player
- Speaker and Amplifiers
- LED Screen

== Affiliates ==
- Kumyoung Media
