= Dennou Keisatsu Cybercop =

Japanese tokusatsu television drama

- Also known as: Cybercop
- Genre: Action adventure Science fantasy
- Created by: Toho
- Starring: Tomonori Yoshida; Mika Chiba; Shogo Shiotani; Ryuji Mizumoto; Ryoma Sasaki; Takashi Koura
- Opening theme: "A Roar to Tomorrow Cyber Heart" by Hiroshi Nishikawa
- Ending theme: "Shooting Star" by Mika Chiba
- Composers: Daisuke Inoue; Yuji Toriyama
- Country of origin: Japan
- Original language: Japanese
- No. of episodes: 36 (Note: 34 regular episodes + 2 recaps)

Production
- Camera setup: Main camera-setting
- Running time: 20 minutes (per episodes)
- Production companies: Toho; Studio Jump; Yomiko Advertising

Original release
- Network: NTV
- Release: October 2, 1988 – July 5, 1989

Cybercop (電脳警察サイバーコップ, Dennō Keisatsu Saibākoppu; lit. "Computer Police Cybercop") is a Japanese tokusatsu television series. Created by Toho in 1988 as an attempt to emulate Toei's Super Sentai motif, the idea was dropped after the unaired pilot, although the show still slightly resembles a sentai show and uses certain tropes of the genre to an extent (such as protagonists wearing color-coordinated armor). It was broadcast on NTV from October 2, 1988, to July 5, 1989.

== Story ==
In 1999, crime has overrun Tokyo. Hopelessly outmanned and outgunned, the Tokyo Metropolitan Police Force decides to set up a special taskforce to combat crimes in their city. Codenamed "ZAC" (Zero-Section Armed Constable), this police department is designed for special missions and its members are known as "Cybercops". For this cause, the police department's scientists develop "Bit Suits", three high-powered armors outfitted with the latest technology: Mars, Saturn and Mercury. In the show's first episode, a mysterious young man, Shinya Takeda, appears out of nowhere and saves the day after using his own armor, the Jupiter Bit Suit. Following his victory, he joins ZAC in battling Death Trap, a nefarious organization ruled by the ruthless Baron Kageyama, whose goal is to use the computers' will-power to gain world domination and appears to be mysteriously linked to Takeda's past. The Death Trap organization uses powerful robots to complete his goals, but the Cybercops always defeat them. During their battles against the enemy's forces, Jupiter bit by bit increases his mysterious powers and reveals a secret: he was found unconscious by an Interpol agent who was wearing his own armor. Shinya Takeda has amnesia; despite this, he receives the support and the friendship of the other ZAC members (except for Akira, who is jealous and critical of Takeda). The union between the ZAC members blossoms more and more. ZAC remains a powerhouse until they encounter Lucifer, an ally of the Death Trap organization that happens to be none other than Jupiter's rival. He's the first enemy that could defeat Jupiter and the other Cybercops. In fact, he almost kills Jupiter. During their battles against ZAC, Lucifer reveals why he hates Jupiter: according to him, they both came from the future and were allies in the war between the human race and the computerized enemy forces, but Jupiter would have betrayed the humans. Because of his amnesia, Jupiter does not know if what Lucifer has said is true, and decides to fight him to the death. In the middle of the fight, however, Jupiter remembers the truth: Besides Jupiter and Lucifer themselves, there were three men that came from the future; the third man was none other than Baron Kageyama. Henceforth, Lucifer allied himself with ZAC. He does not join ZAC, but helps the Cybercops from time to time. Many times, he saves ZAC from losing their battles. After an innumerable number of battles, Lucifer and the ZAC defeat Baron Kageyama by causing a great explosion that came from a laser. Baron Kageyama reveals his purpose for technological world domination, which was to help the world avoid having an anthropogenic environmental collapse happen. Thus, Jupiter and Lucifer return to their time and Tomoko (who loves Jupiter) decides to go with them. In the end The ZAC saved the world from the evil forces of the Death Trap organization and Baron Kageyama.

== Characters ==
- Shinya Takeda/Jupiter: An amnesiac found by the Interpol rescue team, Takeda was assigned to ZAC due to him donning the Jupiter Bit Suit (an advanced version of the newly designed Bit Suits) and in hopes of unraveling his past. While he has a very sunny disposition and is often very fun-loving, he has a considerable temper that can escalate into a "battle rage" when fighting opponents. When this happens, Jupiter is able to summon his own Cyber Arm, the Cyber Thunder Arm, and the Cyber Shield through a process called Cyber Boming, which ultimately destroys his enemies. Later, it is revealed that Takeda is a time traveller from the 23rd century (a future where the sentient machines waged war against humans) and was brought to 1999 by a time-space portal rift opened after the Babylon Tower (a strategical machine HQ) was blown up. Along with him, Lucifer and Kageyama were also transported. His original codename was "Z226" (Z-Double Two Six) "Shinya Takeda" is a name invented by the Interpol. His Jupiter Bit Suit, as well as the Cyber Thunder Arm came with him to the past. In the end of the series, he goes back to the 23rd century with Lucifer and Tomoko, who asks to go with them to fight for a better time. In fact, Takeda is in love with Tomoko: they almost kissed twice, but were interrupted by Akira and were embarrassed.
- Tomoko Uesugi: Backup ZAC officer for the Cybercop. Due to financial problems (both within the show and with Toho in real life), her armor, Venus Bit, was never built. Monitors and assists with the maintenance of Cybernation and Black Chamber systems. Falls in love with Takeda and accompanies him back to the 23rd century by the end of the series. Carries the standard ZAC firearm, the S.D. Gun. She is young, beautiful and affectionate and has a great influence on the other members of Zac. She is the only one who can lead you to teamwork. So often the Cybercops can only win because of Tomoko's leadership.
- Akira Houjyo/Mars: The team leader, Akira's father committed suicide when he was 8 years old, making him to become rebellious and to use his intelligence to hack the system of the enterprise in which his father worked in, eventually bankrupting it. After that, he was practically raised by Captain Oda, who wished to use the kid's high capacity for something beneficial. Cool under pressure and has a strong sense of duty and honor. Became top of his class at the Police Academy and was formerly an elite officer with the Tokyo Police Department. His armor is designed specifically to provide heavy artillery and firearms support. Due to the size of his suit, is one of the slower units and hampers Hojyo's movements a bit. His armor is outfitted with "Stabilize Gear", which brace his armor when he uses his heavy guns.
- Ryoichi Mouri/Saturn: A happy-go-lucky and a jokester, Mori is the team's resident "mood maker". He does not enjoy fighting, eventually doing it because of his duties. He has a younger brother and three younger sisters. His armor is equipped with numerous sensory and communication equipment which help aid the team in tracking down enemies and collecting data. His helmet antenna and his shoulder parabola sonar units can perform a wide range of surveillance, reconnaissance and tracking duties, making it the most vulnerable Bit Suit.
- Osamu Saiyonji/Mercury: Sayionji's is the resident hand-to-hand combat specialist. His brother was also a cop, as Osamu always wanted to follow his steps. However, his brother was killed in action while investigating a case. From that point on, Osamu's mother tried to preserve him from the danger and risks of being a cop. Despite his moments of conflict, Osamu is very brave and has a great fighting spirit. His armor is the most lightweight of the armors and affords him extreme flexibility in movement and speed albeit at the cost of defense and protection. His unit is the fastest of the "Cyber Bit" armors and he can travel at incredible speeds (his unit is equipped with air brakes which aid him in stopping). Mercury also has access to the "Linear Speeder" skates which enables him to traverse at speeds of up to 128 miles per hour (206 km/h). The skates can be controlled via brainwave controls in the Bit Suit helmet.
- Lucifer: Takeda's ex-partner in the future, was also transported with him and Kageyama to the 20th century through the same time-space portal. At first, his only wish is to avenge his dead comrades, targeting Jupiter as his nemesis and challenging him to a death confront. He allies with Baron Kageyama believing Takeda was the traitor who murdered his companions. Eventually, it is revealed that Kageyama was the mole. From then, Lucifer decides to aid the Cybercops without joining the group, helping them in battle more often than not. Lucifer's bit, along with Jupiter's, is the most powerful of the Bit Suits, as it is more equipped and enhanced than the others. Armed with two high-power pistols called Impulse Magnum, two machine-guns which come from his back to shoulders, the Pulsar Cannon, Gigamax and the Cyber Graviton, an energy absorber-releaser on his chest.

=== Other ZAC Members ===
- Captain Hisayoshi Oda: Sometimes strictly wrapped around young men who are kind and gently give instructions. Because of their personality the members' trust is also thick. Sometimes you say a cold pun.
- Shimazu Mizue: Second In Command. ZAC 's secretary and cap representative. She support Oda and sometimes take command when Oda is absent. There used to be a past where she became love with a bit suit researcher, but he is a victim of a missile that hit the laboratory. She is about ZAC's work which uses a bit suit to say also as his child through single bachelors.
- Daisuke Yazawa: ZAC computer operator. He gather information and analyze, and assist strategy. Abundant knowledge of computer and science.
- Miho Asakura: Communication officer of ZAC. Natural blur. The way of speaking has a slightly lingering impression. An ordinary girl who will always run away against the ZAC's duty to throw out his life.

=== Death Trap ===
The goals of the Death Trap organization are to eliminate all humankind on Earth and supplant the world with computer and silicon lifeforms.

Led by the maniacal and crazed computer program "Führer" Soutou (Despot Führer), the "Death Trap" launches a number of terrorist attacks against Tokyo, using its army of "Death Droids" and battle mecha.

It is later revealed that the "Despot Führer" was in actuality a computer entity from the 23rd century which was sent back in time to usurp control of the world. The computer was built by a human - future criminal mastermind Baron Kageyama, who planned on ruling the world by taking over the past. Baron Kageyama, who had also created Madame Durwin, Einstein, Ploid and Luna, later merges himself with Despot Führer to become a superhuman entity.

The "Death Trap" consists of three crime organizations listed below. All of their leaders turn out to be androids created by Baron Kageyama.

The Ominous Gang

Led by the evil criminal Professor Einstein, his gang consists of specially designed black armored Ominous Death Droids which can be customized with a number of deadly weapon attachments. Prof. Einstein's brain was transplanted with the brain of a leading Hi-Tech/Cybernetics expert. Using this newfound knowledge he is able to unlock the mysteries of "Super Physics" (Cho Rion Butsuri) to modify his Ominous droids.

The Harkos Gang

Led by the feline-like Madam Durwin who commands the ghostly white Harcross Death Droids. These can also be outfitted with a number of deadly weapon attachments which are customizable. Durwin was an expert in biology and genetics. Thus her name, which was a play of Charles Darwin, a famous naturalist.

Durwin was ordered to destroy the train tracks which the Cybercops were also traveling on with Luna, after learning Luna was an android. As Durwin warned Luna, Luna was nevertheless killed by baron Kageyama, who showed puzzlement over why his most beautiful creation would betray him. Luna said: "You could never understand the feelings of a puppet! You became a doll without human feelings!" After Luna exploded, the Baron confessed he loved her, as it's impossible to be a perfect doll by not having feelings and by thus being dangerous.

The Garoga Gang

Led by the hulking Doctor Arthur Ploid, his Garogoid (Hie Ningen Gata Mecha <Non-Humanoid Mecha>) army is composed of monstrous mecha creations and robots. His brain was replaced with a leading expert in psychology Arthur C. Ploid, a scientist who died in 1937. Ploid is a specialist in grand scale attacks and psychological warfare. He carries an electrified whip.

Others

Later yet another gang is incorporated into the "Death Trap":

Beast Master Luna and The Four Kings

Luna is Professor Enstein's sister. She managed to avenge her brother's death at the hands of the Cybercops. Luna had assembled four super soldiers who would help her defeat the CyberCops:

- Tiger – armed with razor sharp boomerangs which he could use to behead his enemies.
- Salamander – who was armed with an electric charged whip.
- Turtle – who had superhuman strength and the ability to emit fire bursts.
- Hawk – a master martial artist whose hands and feet were armed with razors.

She later fell in love with Akira, who is her brother's rival, only to discover after joining him that she was an android and all her memories were false. Luna died protecting Akira from an energy blast by Baron Kageyama.

== Episode list ==
Episode 14 ended up airing on January 15, 1989, because Emperor Shōwa died on January 7; and on April 5, the day that Episode 25 aired, the show began airing on Wednesdays instead of Sundays.

1. The Strongest Detective! Jupiter Appears (最強の刑事!ジュピター登場, Saikyō no Keiji! Jupitā Tōjō) (Original Airdate: October 2, 1988)
2. The City Is Sinking! Save The Seaside Metropolis (街がしずむ!海上都市を救え, Machi ga Shizumu! Kaijō Toshi o Sukue) (Original Airdate: October 9, 1988)
3. Clash! The Cyborg Tank (激突!サイボーグタンク!, Gekitotsu! Saibōgu Tanku!) (Original Airdate: October 16, 1988)
4. Traffic Panic! The Computer's Trap (交通パニック!コンピューターの罠, Kōtsu Panikku! Konpyūtā no Wana) (Original Airdate: October 23, 1988)
5. A Prince In Trouble! Escape From The Dark Zone (危うし王子!ダークゾーンからの脱出, Ayaushi Ōji! Dāku Zōn kara no Dasshutsu) (Original Airdate: October 30, 1988)
6. Oda Targeted! ZAC In Big Trouble (狙われた織田!ZAC大ピンチ, Nerawareta Oda! ZAC Dai Pinchi) (Original Airdate: November 6, 1988)
7. The Murderous Jet!! Urban Warfire In Tokyo (殺人ジェット!!東京市街戦, Satsujin Jetto!! Tōkyō Jigaisen) (Original Airdate: November 13, 1988)
8. Electric Dam In Danger! Operation Tokyo Darkness (危うし電子ダム!東京暗黒作戦, Ayaushi Denko Damu! Tōkyō Ankoku Sakusen) (Original Airdate: November 20, 1988)
9. The Racing Machine!! Blade Liner Appears (激走マシン!!ブレードライナー登場, Gekisō Mashin!! Burēdo Rainā Tōjō) (Original Airdate: November 27, 1988)
10. A Ghost Hotel!? So Many Zombies (幽霊ホテル!?ゾンビがいっぱい, Yūrei Hoteru? Zonbi ga Ippai) (Original Airdate: December 4, 1988)
11. The Flying Tank!! Life Or Death On Highway (空とぶ戦車!!ハイウェーの死闘, Sora Tobu Sensha!! Haiuē no Shitō) (Original Airdate: December 11, 1988)
12. The Dragon Dances! A Strange Christmas (ドラゴンが舞う!ふしぎなXマス, Doragon ga Mau! Fushigi na X Masu) (Original Airdate: December 18, 1988)
13. The Satellite Is Falling!! Jupiter Dies On The Job!? (衛星が落ちる!ジュピター殉職!?, Eisei ga Ochiru! Jupitā Junshoku!?) (Original Airdate: December 25, 1988)
14. Takeda's Secret!! He's Seen The Illusive Future (武田の秘密!!まぼろしの未来を見た, Takeda no Himitsu!! Maboroshi Mirai o Mita) (Original Airdate: January 15, 1989)
15. Change The Future!! The Soldier Of Hope, Jupiter (未来を変えろ!!希望の戦士ジュピター, Mirai o Kaero!! Kibō no Senshi Jupitā) (Original Airdate: January 22, 1989)
16. Hell's Emissary?! Lucifer Appears!! (地獄の使者!?ルシファー登場, Jigoku no Shisha!? Rushifā Tōjō) (Original Airdate: January 29, 1989)
17. Lucifer's Counterattack!! The Devil's Challenge (ルシファーの逆襲!!悪魔の挑戦状, Rushifā no Gyakūshū!! Akuma no Chōsenjō) (Original Airdate: February 5, 1989)
18. Boming Is Impossible!! A Giant UFO Appears (ボミング不能!!巨大UFO現わる, Bomingu Funō!! Kyodai UFO Arawaru) (Original Airdate: February 12, 1989)
19. Uesugi's Mutiny!! The Dangerous Female Detective (上杉の反乱!!危ない女刑事, Uesugi no Hanran!! Abunai Onna Keiji) (Original Airdate: February 19, 1989)
20. The Roaring Killer Weapon!! Gigamax's Power (うなる必殺武器!!ギガマックスの威力, Unaru Hissatsu Buki!! Gigamakkusu no Iryoku) (Original Airdate: February 26, 1989)
21. The 5th Cop!? The Ultimate Cyber, Lucifer (5人目のコップ!?究極のサイバー・ルシファー, Goninme no Koppu!? Kyūkyoku no Saibā Rushifā) (Original Airdate: March 5, 1989)
22. Fake Cybers!! ZAC's Ultimate Crisis (にせサイバー!!ZAC絶体絶命, Nise Saibā!! ZAC Zettaizetsumei) (Original Airdate: March 12, 1989)
23. The Final Killer Attack!! Cybernic Wave (最後の必殺技!!サイバニック・ウェーブ, Saigo no Hissatsu Waza!! Saibānikku Uēbu) (Original Airdate: March 19, 1989)
24. The Missiles Fire!! Clash At Deathtrap's Base (ミサイル発進!!激突デストラップ基地, Misairu Hasshin!! Gekitotsu Desutorappu Kichi) (Original Airdate: March 26, 1989)
25. The Frightening Female Soldier! Luna Arrives (恐怖の女戦士!ルナ登場, Kyōfu no Josenshi! Runa Tōjō) (Original Airdate: April 5, 1989)
26. Destroy The Invisible Fortress!! (見えない要塞をたたけ!!, Mienai Yōsai o Tatake!!) (Original Airdate: April 12, 1989)
27. The Cyber Bits Are Broken!! (こわれたサイバービット!!, Kowareta Saibā Bitto!!) (Original Airdate: April 19, 1989)
28. City Air Strike! The Blimp Bomb (シティ空爆!飛行戦爆弾, Shiti Kūbaku! Kikōsen Bakudan) (Original Airdate: April 26, 1989)
29. Assassinate Uesugi! Hurry Cops (上杉暗殺!いそげコップ, Uesugi Ansatsu! Isoge Koppu) (Original Airdate: May 10, 1989)
30. Dash Through The Devil's Mountain!! (悪魔の山を走りぬけ!!, Akuma no Yama o Hashirinuke!!) (Original Airdate: May 17, 1989)
31. The Stolen Thunder Arm (奪われたサンダーアーム, Ubawareta Sandā Āmu) (Original Airdate: May 24, 1989)
32. The Loft Is Attacked!! (おそわれたロフト!!, Osowareta Rofuto!!) (Original Airdate: May 31, 1989)
33. Defend The Linear Car! (リニアカーをまもれ!, Rineakā o Mamore!) (Original Airdate: June 7, 1989)
34. The End of Deathtrap!! (デストラップのさいご!!, Desutorappu no Saigo!!) (Original Airdate: June 14, 1989)
35. Request Top 10 Special Part 1 (リクエスト・トップ10特集 Part1, Rikuesuto Toppu Ten Tokushū Pātto Wan) (Original Airdate: June 28, 1989)
36. Request Top 10 Special Part 2 (リクエスト・トップ10特集 Part2, Rikuesuto Toppu Ten Tokushū Pātto Tsu) (Original Airdate: July 5, 1989)

== Cast ==
- Shinya Takeda/Jupiter: Tomonori Yoshida
- Tomoko Uesugi: Mika Chiba
  - Fake Tomoko Uesugi (19): Mika Chiba
- Akira Hojyo/Mars: Shogo Shiotani
- Ryoichi Mori/Saturn: Tom Saeba (credited as Ryuji Mizumoto)
- Osamu Saionji/Mercury: Ryoma Sasaki
- Lucifer: Takashi Koura
- Captain Hisayoshi Oda: Masaaki Daimon
  - Fake Captain Oda (6): Masaaki Daimon
- Lt. Shimazu Mizue: Atsuko Mita
- Daisuke Yazawa: Shuhei Suzuki
- Miho Asakura: Hiromi Onishi
- Baron Kageyama: Jinya Sato
- Dr. Ploid: Ken Okabe
- Mme. Durwin/Harkos (voice): Tomoko Ishimura
- Dr. Einstein/Ominos (voice) (1-24): Takeshi Hayashi
- Luna/Ominos (voice) (25-34): Masako Takeda
- Führer/Narrator: Goro Mutsumi
- ZAC's Syntheised Speech: Tembaro Baba

=== Guest stars ===
- Cops (1): Saburo Ishikura, Mitsuhiro Takeda
- Lighthouse Attendant (2): Chafurin
- President Ryuichi Kaido (3): Sei Hiraizumi
- Reporter (3): Aruno Tahara
- Reiko Ando (4): Shiho Wada
- Prince Rolan (5): Roger Allen Hamrick
- Kindergarten Bus' Criminals (7): Makoto Kakeda and Ryo Yamada
- Wolf (7): Ulf Otsuki
- Osamu's Mother (8, 32): Kumiko Kishi
- Maki Ichijo (9): Masako Shiozawa
- Dr. Yamamoto (9, 11, 17, 33–34): Akira Otani
- Alisa (11): Kurumi Wakuseiji
- Koichi Tachibana (12): Takeshi Iwase
- Akemi/Fake Akemi (13): Natsumi Nanase
- Elder Cid (16): Ichiro Izawa
- Kirara (16): Hiroko Ichikawa
- Rampage Jack/Fake Rampage Jack (Efta Harkos' human form) (16): Kazutoshi Yokoyama
- Police University Female Dormitory's Director (19): Nadeshiko Yamato
- Police Officer (19): Daisuke Ijima
- Misako Saegusa (20): Rie Hirakata
- Pai Lo (23): Jyunichi Haruta
- Satoru (26): Yousuke Iizuka
- Yukari (26): Yuko Honna
- Kazumi Mori (27, 30,32): Rika Abiko
- Naomi Mori (27, 30, 32): Mayumi Muto
- Kenji Mori (27, 30, 32): Daisuke Kurosawa
- Kumi Mori (27, 30, 32): Ayagi Aragaki
- Mamoru (28): Toshiharu Shinohara
- Kazuo Hasegawa (29): So Furukawa
- Hustler (human form, ep 31): Toshimichi Takahashi

=== Stunt ===
- Mars (sub)/Efta Harkos: Kazutoshi Yokoyama
- Jupiter: Richii Seike
- Deathtrap's soldiers and monsters: Koichi Kayama, Takashi Sakamoto, Tokio Iwata, Takayuki Ishii, Yasuhiko Imai, Eichi Takagi and Hiromitsu Miyamoto

== Songs ==
Opening theme

- "A Roar To Tomorrow Cyber Heart" (明日への叫び ～サイバー・ハート, Asu e no Sakebi Cyber Heart)
  - Lyrics: Yuho Iwasato (岩里祐穂, Iwasato Yuho)
  - Composition: Daisuke Inoue (井上 大佑, Inoue Daisuke)
  - Arrangement: Ryomei Shirai (Shirai Ryomei)
  - Artist: Hiroshi Nishikawa (西川弘志, Nishikawa Hiroshi)

Ending theme

- "Shooting Star" (シューティングスター) (1–33, 35–36)
  - Lyrics: Shun Taguchi (Taguchi Shun)
  - Composition: Yuji Toriyama (Toriyama Yuji)
  - Arrangement: Yuji Toriyama
  - Artist: Mika Chiba (千葉美加, Chiba Mika)
- "Brand New Tomorrow" (34)
  - Lyrics: Shun Taguchi
  - Composition: VAX POP
  - Arrangement: Ryo Kunihiko (Kunihiko Ryo)
  - Artist: Mika Chiba

== International Broadcast, Home Video and Streaming ==
- In its home country of Japan from September 8, 1989, to February 9, 1990, the full series was released on VHS by Toho Video spread across nine volumes, each holding four episodes per tape. Then, from 1997 to 1998, which was the 10th anniversary of the series' broadcast, an Laserdisc boxset that contains all 36 episodes put into two volumes known as the Jupiter BOX and the Lucifer BOX was released. From January 21, 2005 to March 25, 2005, three DVD volumes were released, with each containing two discs and 12 episodes. On top of that on November 3, 2018, six volumes were released simultaneously as part of the "Toho DVD Masterpiece Selection" series. Each volume contains six episodes. And to commemorate this, from November 6, 2018, to December 25, 2018, eight selected episodes were distributed for a limited time on the Takora Channel on YouTube, which is Toho's official Tokusatsu channel on the site (Those episodes being: 1, 2, 7, 9, 16, 19, 23 and 27).
- In 1990, Sato Company acquired the license rights to bring the series over to Brazil, where it aired as Cybercop, os Policiais do Futuro (Cybercop, the Police of the Future) with a Brazilian Portuguese dub and covers all 36 episodes. The series was a huge hit in the country with very high ratings earned, as it remained on the air via the now defunct Rede Manchete from 1990 to 1995, with re-runs occurring. Later, in 2000, the series was reaired, this time on Rede CNT. It has also been shown on Ulbra TV in Porto Alegre And in 2018, it was shown on TV Diário de Fortaleza. Earlier on in 1992, Editora Abril began a lineup of a comic series featuring Japanese TV Heroes as part of the Heróis da TV (Heroes of TV) series, where several different Tokusatsu properties were used. Cybercop was one of them to be rotated and given a tie-in release, where issues 8, 12, 16 and 20 had them featured. The series was also released on VHS and DVD in addition.
- In Thailand, the series was shown as Iron Police Cybercop (ตำรวจเหล็ก ไซเบอร์คอป). It aired on TV and was released on home video with a Thai dub.
- In Malaysia, the series was put on home video in 1994, released by Character Merchandising under distribution by Speedy Video on VHS and VCD with an English dub produced in the region and was released as simply Cybercop. Each volume containing two episodes. The series aired on TV with a Malay dub by FKN Dubbing on TV3 on October 29, 1994, to May 7, 1996.
- In the Chinese-speaking world, Both Cantonese and Mandarin (Taiwan dialect) dubs were produced and aired in Hong Kong and Taiwan and respectively.
  - In Hong Kong, the series aired with a Cantonese Chinese dub, with all 36 episodes covered.
  - In Taiwan, the series aired in the late 1990s on the Shohua Cartoon Channel with a Taiwanese Mandarin dub, with all 36 episodes covered.
- This series was never officially released in North America, especially in the United States in any form. However, on May 17, 1994, Toho did file a U.S. Trademark on "CYBERCOPS" to be used in motion pictures, video tapes, toys, games, and other media. But nothing came out of this and Toho abandoned this merchandise plan by February 9, 1998. Interestingly enough, Zima Products, a toy manufacturer based in Hong Kong, produced a toy lineup known as "Power Force", which are American action figures based on Takara's Cybercop toys. The Zero-Section Armed Constable was renamed to Zero-Section Armed Police (ZAP) while Jupiter, Lucifer, Saturn, Mars, and Mercury's names were changed to Biotron, Blazord, Zortron, Destron, and Spectron, respectively. Though, it's not known if there were any tie-ins to the cancelled planned TV adaptation.
