= Shigeichi Negishi =

Japanese inventor (1923–2024)

- 根岸 重一
- Born: November 29, 1923; Tokyo, Japan
- Died: January 26, 2024 (aged 100)
- Education: Hosei University
- Children: 3

Shigeichi Negishi (November 29, 1923 – January 26, 2024) was a Japanese engineer who invented the earliest prototype of the karaoke machine. Using a speaker, a microphone, and a tape deck, he was able to simultaneously amplify his voice and play an instrumental backing track. Although Daisuke Inoue receives more international recognition for a similar invention, the All-Japan Karaoke Industrialist Association recognizes Negishi as the first among five independent inventors of the karaoke machine.

== Biography ==
Negishi was born in the ward of Itabashi in Tokyo, Japan on November 29, 1923. His mother ran a tobacco store and his father was a public official who oversaw regional elections. As a child, he made cardboard cityscapes and gained a reputation for studiousness, winning a national calligraphy competition at the age of eleven. Negishi studied economics at Hosei University in Tokyo and was drafted into the Japanese Army during the Second World War. After Japan was defeated, he became a prisoner of war and was detained for two years in Singapore. After his release in 1947, Negishi sold Olympus cameras and later founded the consumer electronics company Nichiden Kogyo in 1956.

Eleven years later, an employee supposedly teased Negishi for his bad voice while he was singing to himself at work. Believing he would sound better with a backing track, he and his staff wired together a speaker, microphone, and tape deck. To test the machine, Negishi used an 8-track instrumental rendering of the song "Mujo no Yume" (Note: Translation: "The Heartless Dream") by Yoshio Kodama. To market the product, Negishi partnered with a friend who worked at the Japan Broadcasting Corporation and travelled throughout Japan, giving demonstrations. After Negishi found a distributor, the machine was dubbed the "Sparko Box" as the word karaoke sounded similar to kan'oke, the Japanese word for coffin. Marketed under various names, Negishi sold about 8,000 Sparko Boxes. In 1975, Negishi dissolved his karaoke business after facing difficulties and fully retired around 1993. He never patented Sparko Box, and other inventors such as Daisuke Inoue have created similar products, also receiving credit for inventing the karaoke machine. His daughter expressed that he was not bothered by the lack of a patent that could have made him wealthy, stating that her father had "felt a lot of pride in seeing his idea evolve into a culture of having fun through song around the world."

Negishi died due to natural causes following a fall on January 26, 2024, at the age of 100.
