= Roberto del Rosario =

Patent-holder of the Sing Along karaoke system

- Born: Roberto Legaspi del Rosario; 1919 or 1920
- Died: 2003 (aged 83)
- Known for: Patentholder for the Sing Along karaoke system.
- Notable work: Inventor Of Sing Along Karaoke; Voice Color Tape

Roberto Legaspi del Rosario (1919/1920 – 2003 ) was a Filipino entrepreneur; best known as the patentholder of the Sing-Along System, a type of karaoke appliance he developed in 1975. From his entrepreneurial initiative to patent a karaoke system first, he frequently, albeit arguably, became referred to as "the inventor of Karaoke" in the Philippines.

== Patent rights to karaoke ==
Roberto Legaspi del Rosario held the patent to the Sing-along System, a type of karaoke he developed in 1975, and was consequently recognized as the sole patent holder of the karaoke system worldwide. The prototype was initially dubbed as the "one-man combo". He developed the system as a teaching aid for his students in his singing school. He became widely credited in the Philippines as the "inventor of the karaoke". Elsewhere the credit goes to the Japanese.

Other people credited to have invented the karaoke are:

- Shigeichi Negishi created the Sparko Box singalong system in 1967, although he never patented it.
- Daisuke Inoue, a Japanese man, who built the Juke-8 karaoke machine in 1971.

Del Rosario in 1999 filed a infringement lawsuit against San Juan-based firm Juanito Corp. of Chinese-Filipino businessman Juanito Eng Cua for its Miyata Karaoke system. Juanito in its defence said that karaoke was invented by the Japanese citing a 1999 Time magazine article crediting Inoue. A court ruled in Del Rosario's favor and with Juanito disputing the decision with the Court of Appeals as of 2002.

== See also ==
- Daisuke Inoue
- Karaoke
