= Out of Phase Stereo =

Audio technique

Out of Phase Stereo (OOPS) is an audio technique which manipulates the phase of a stereo audio track, to isolate or remove certain components of the stereo mix. It works on the principle of phase cancellation, in which two identical but inverted waveforms summed together will "cancel the other out".

== Process ==
When a sine wave is mixed with one of identical frequency but opposite amplitude (ie: of an inverse polarity), the combined result is silence. A two-channel stereo recording contains a number of waveforms; sounds that are panned to the extreme left or right will contain the greatest difference in amplitude between the two channels, while those towards the centre will contain the smallest. A mix of the left channel with the polar inverse of the right channel will reduce centre-panned sounds towards silence, while preserving those towards the extremities.

In practice, the OOPS technique can be performed by inverting the polarity of one speaker or signal lead. It can also be performed using digital audio software by inverting one of the channels of a stereo audio waveform, and then summing both channels together to create a single mono channel.

== Applications in music ==
This technique has been previously used to eliminate vocals in a stereo track (as vocals tend to be panned centre) to create crude karaoke tracks, or generate surround channels from a stereo source, such as in Dolby Pro Logic. It has also been used in the recording process to include tracks that were only audible once an OOPS technique was applied. This feature can be observed in several of the Beatles' stereo albums. Australian band Cinema Prague recorded a single track Meldatype that contained two songs played simultaneously, one of which was only audible after an OOPS technique was applied. It consisted of two mono tracks: a loud and distorted electric guitar playing chords repetitively, as well as a quiet vocal track. The guitar had one of the channels inverted, while the vocal track was identical in both channels. During normal playback, the guitar would be heard throughout the entire track. When the channels were summed to mono, however, the regular and inverted guitar tracks would cancel out, revealing the vocal track to the listener.
