= Karaoke box =

Type of karaoke establishment

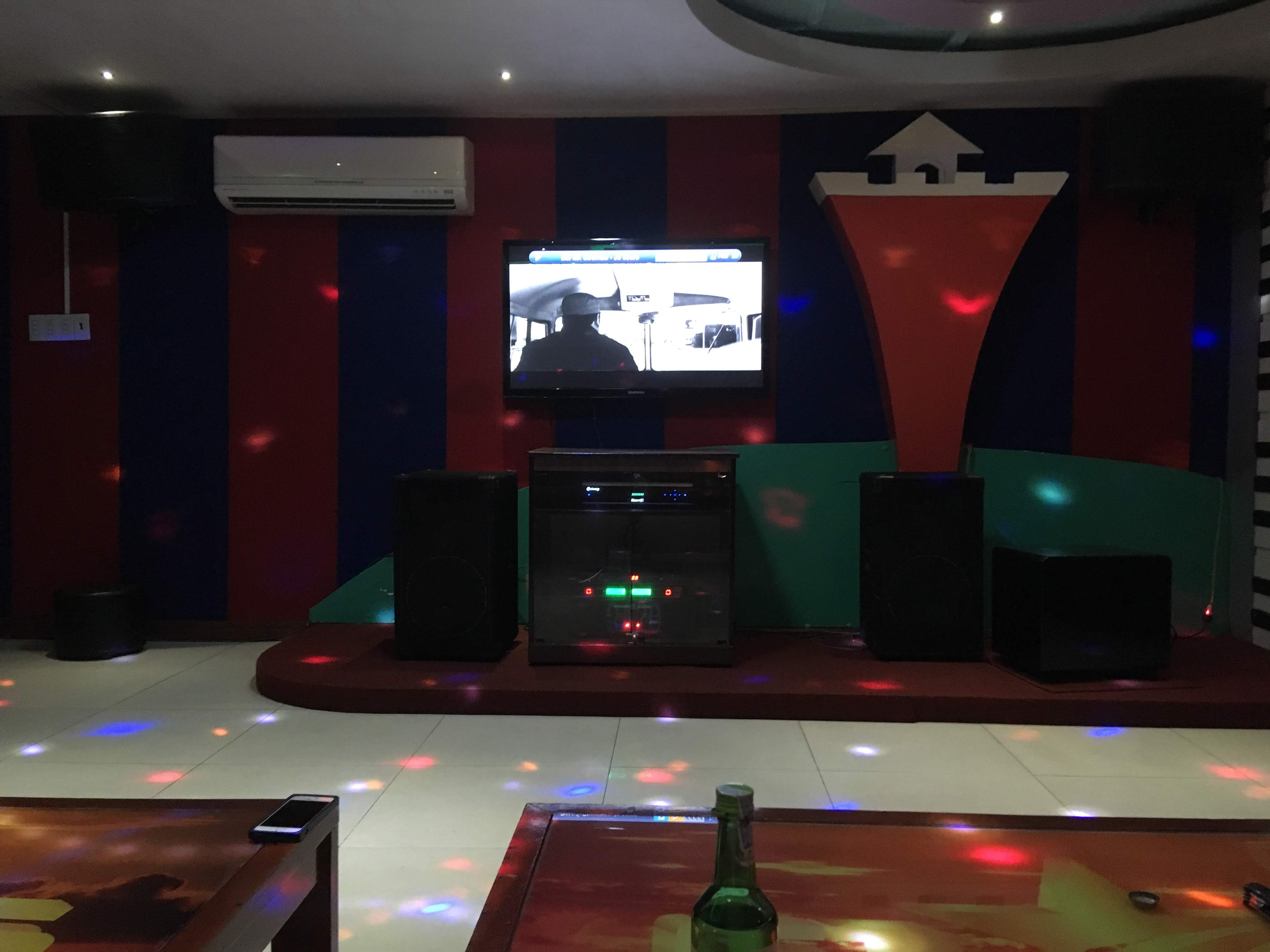
A karaoke lounge in Nha Trang, Vietnam

A karaoke box (カラオケボックス, karaoke bokkusu) is a type of karaoke establishment commonly found in Asia, the United States and Canada. It originated in Japan, and is now popular worldwide, particularly in Asia. Karaoke boxes consist of multiple rooms containing karaoke equipment, usually rented out for a period of time. A typical karaoke box establishment contains 10–20 (or more) such rooms, that can be themed so that each room has a different feeling or can be a traditional karaoke box, as well as have a main karaoke bar area in the front. Karaoke box establishments often sell beverages, and sometimes food, but sometimes the establishment offers free refreshments. Many people of all ages enjoy karaoke as a pastime in Japan, as it still has a significant influence in the Japanese music scene and tourists are attracted to it as well. While people visit and enjoy karaoke boxes with family and friends, people also go by themselves and are able to enjoy the comfort of performing in the room by themselves. There is also a different style of karaoke, the traditional type where the patrons sing in front of everyone, that is also still offered in popular entertainment areas.

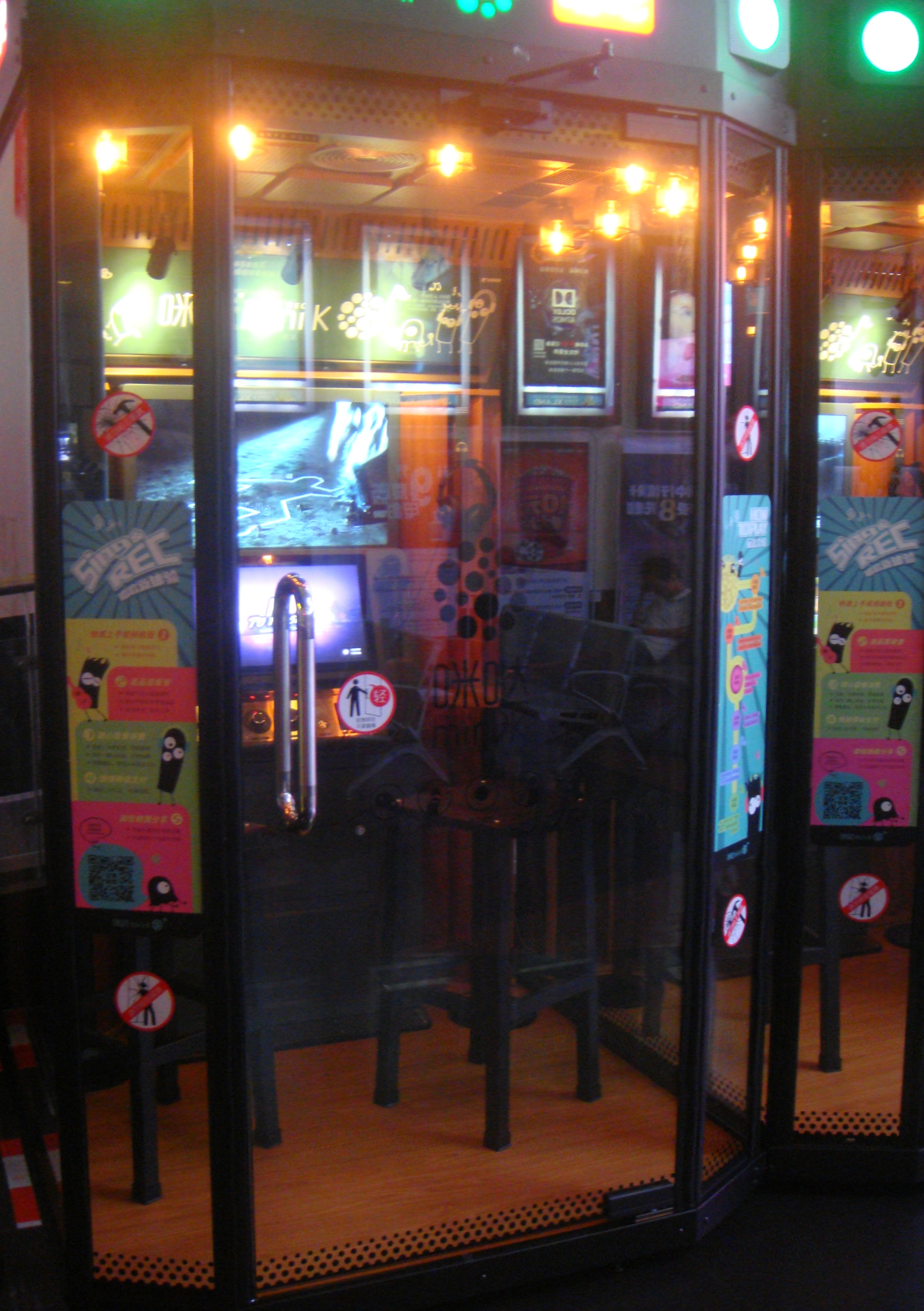
Karaoke booth

A new style of karaoke booth has appeared in Chinese shopping malls; customers can enter a booth, similar to a photo-booth, that allows them to perform different songs. It is suitable for use by one or two people. The booths are cheaper than the traditional karaoke box, as customers do not have to rent a room but just go in and sing a number of songs. The booths are very similar to the karaoke boxes but on a more intimate scale, with at least 20,000 booths running with an estimated CN¥3.18 billion (US$477 million) in 2017. The booths have an air conditioner, seats for the customers, the karaoke equipment, and headsets.

Another recent trend is offering boxes for daytime meetings for businesses who need a cheap business room.

There has also been conversation about fire safety with karaoke boxes after an arson in Hong Kong which led to public concern about their safety. One test recreated an establishment with three boxes and a corridor, in a remote location in China, with the intention of testing a real-time fire in a karaoke establishment. There has also been additional research about karaoke boxes as to ensure the safety of the customers in evacuation research about widening the length of hallways.

The term karaoke box is primarily used in Japan, Hong Kong and Macau. Karaoke box establishments are commonly known as KTV (an abbreviation of karaoke television) in Taiwan, China, Cambodia, Myanmar, Singapore, the United States and Canada, videoke in the Philippines, noraebang (노래방) in South Korea (literally meaning singing room), hwamyŏn panju ŭmaksil (화면반주음악실) in North Korea (literally meaning screen accompaniment music room), karaoke room in Vietnam, and karaoke club in Sri Lanka. It is also common to simply abbreviate it as K in Hong Kong Cantonese, often when used as a verb, for example 去K歌 (to go K songs) or 去唱K (to go sing K).

== Gallery ==
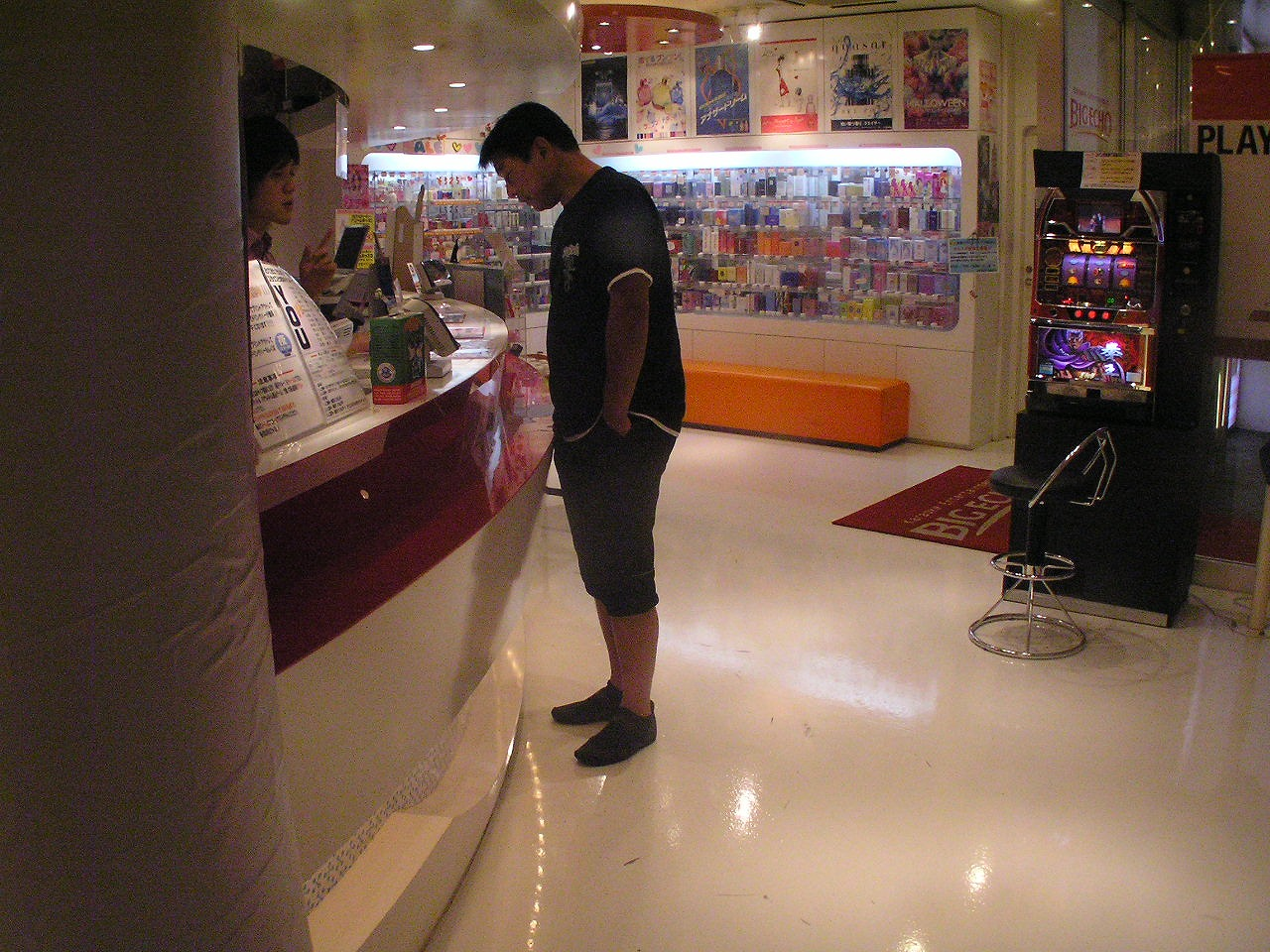
Lobby of a karaoke box in Japan

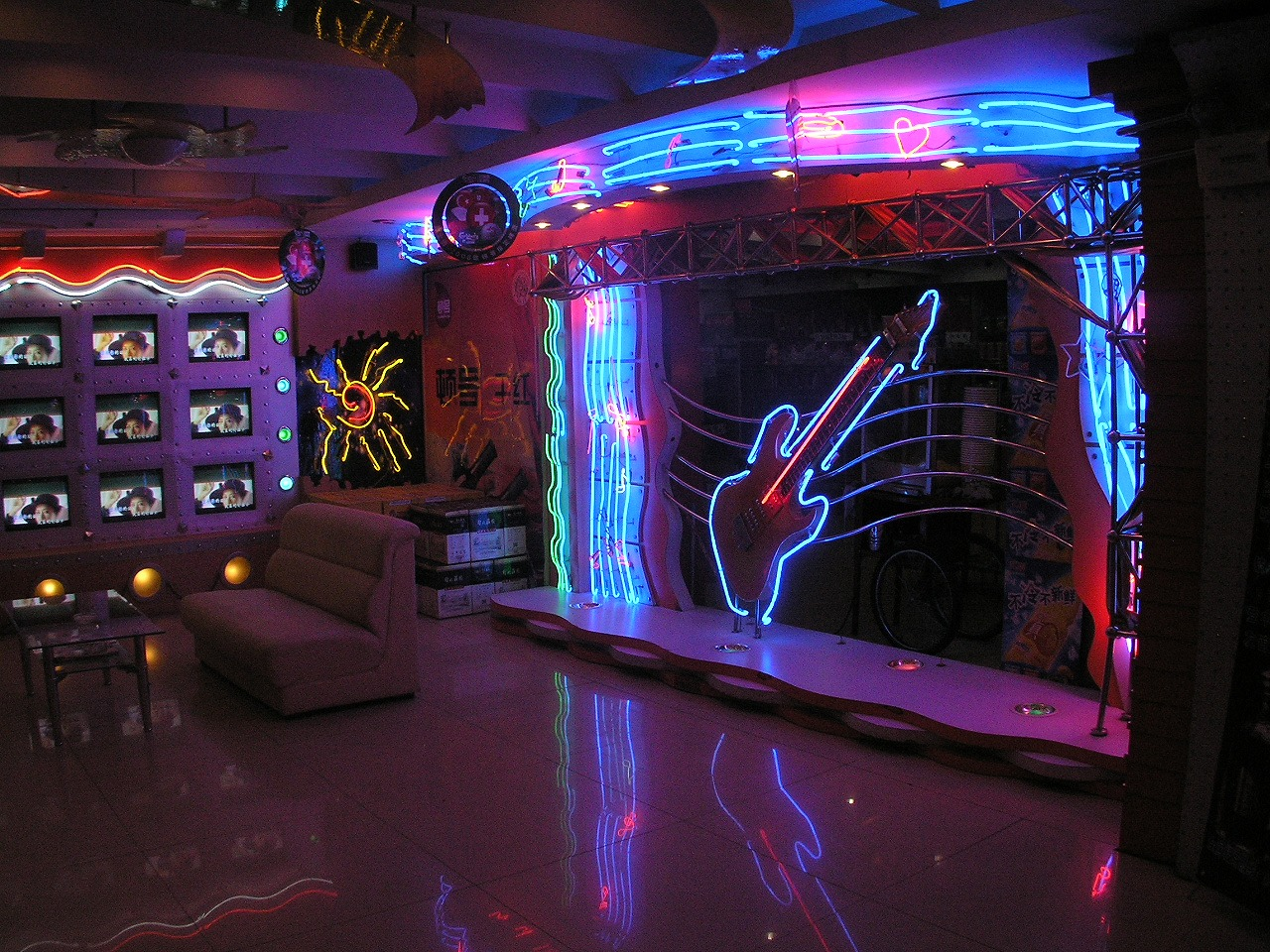
Entrance to a karaoke box in Harbin, China

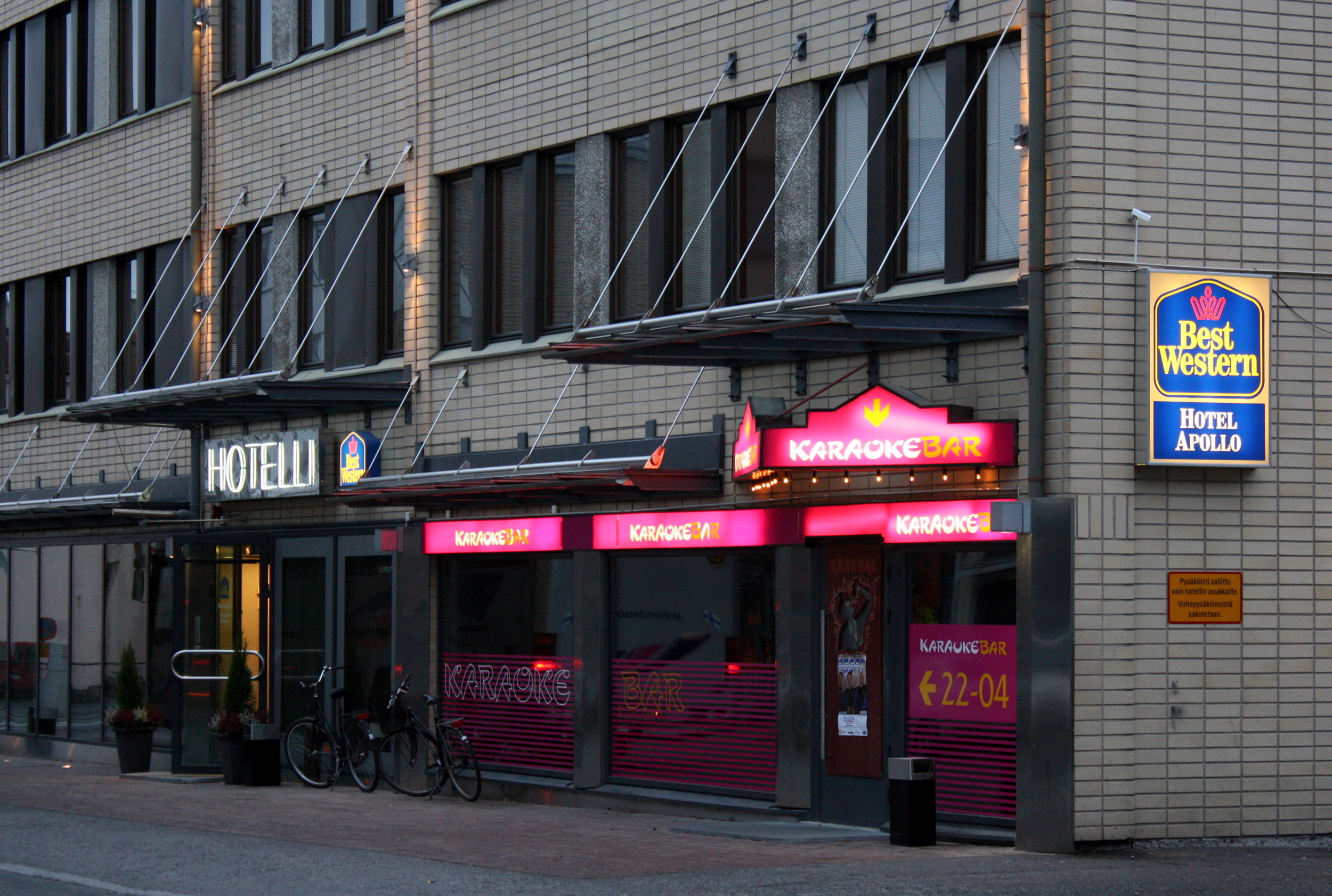
Entrance to the Best Western Hotel Apollo and Karaoke Bar in Oulu, Finland

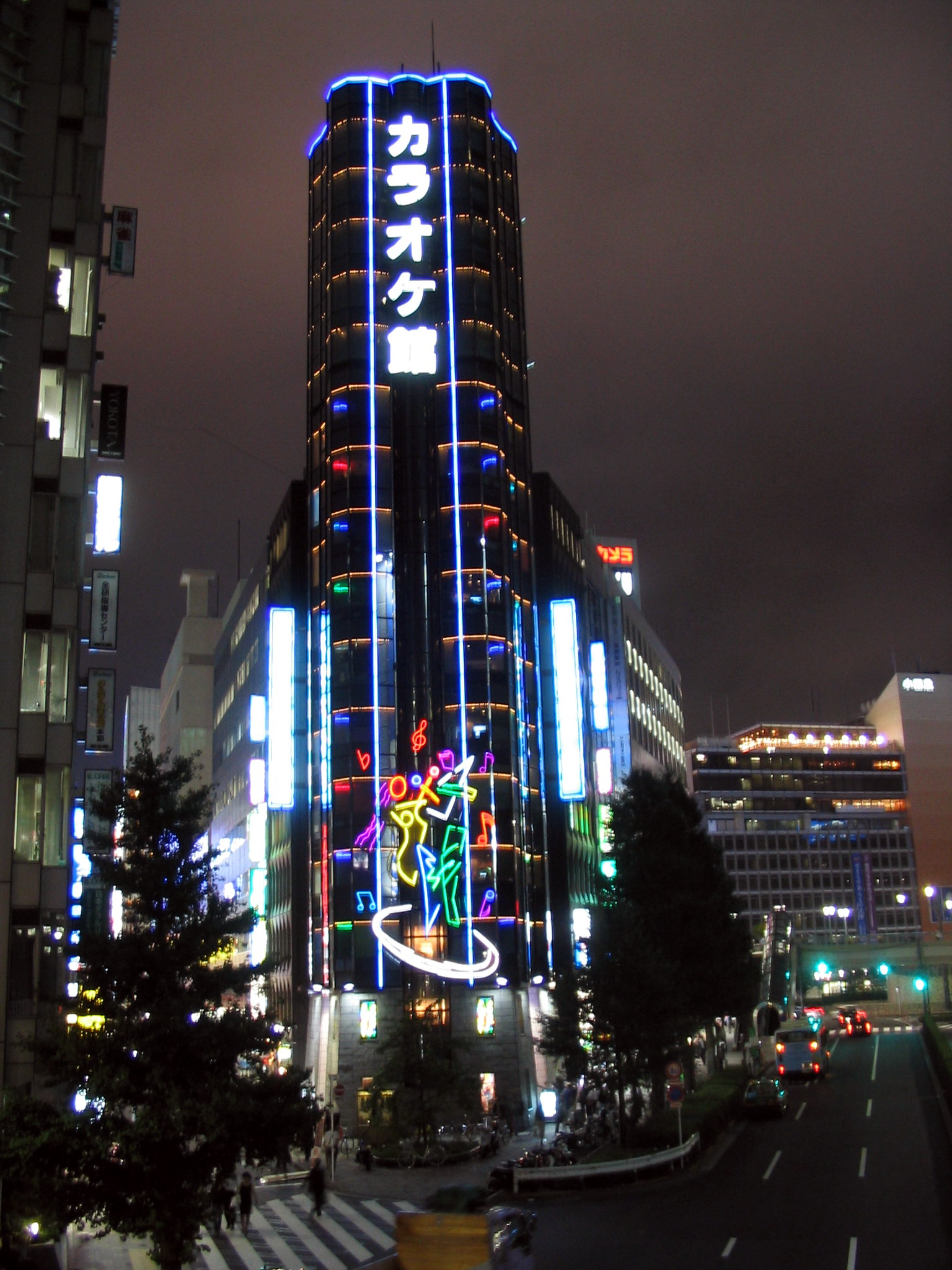
A karaoke box in a skyscraper in Shinjuku, Tokyo, featured in the movie Lost in Translation
