= Karaoke =

Form of entertainment involving singing to recorded music

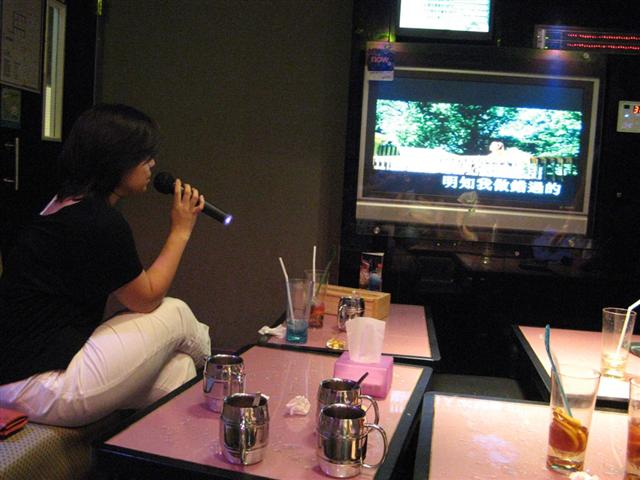
A person singing karaoke in Hong Kong ("Run Away from Home" by Janice Vidal)

Karaoke (Note: English: /ˌkæriˈoʊki/; Japanese: [ka.ɾa.o.ke]. Clipped compound of Japanese kara (空; transl. empty) and ōkesutora (オーケストラ; transl. orchestra).) (カラオケ) is a type of interactive entertainment system usually offered in nightclubs and bars, where people sing along to pre-recorded accompaniment using a microphone.

Its musical content is an instrumental rendition of a well-known popular song. In recent times, lyrics are typically displayed on a video screen, along with a moving symbol, changing colour, or music video images, to guide the singer. In Chinese-speaking countries and regions such as mainland China, Hong Kong, Taiwan, and Singapore, a karaoke box is called a KTV. The global karaoke market has been estimated to be worth nearly $10 billion.

Karaoke's global popularity has been fueled by technological advancements, making it a staple of social gatherings and entertainment venues all over the world. The precursors of karaoke machines using cassette tapes made their first appearances in Japan and the Philippines in the 1970s. Commercial versions manufactured by Japanese companies using LaserDisc became available worldwide in the 1980s, leading to a surge in popularity. Karaoke machines are commonly found in lounges, nightclubs, and bars; as well as in-home versions which later combined with home theater systems. Over time, karaoke has evolved with digital music, video games, smartphone apps, and online platforms, allowing users to sing anytime and anywhere. Beyond leisure, karaoke is used for professional training in music and public speaking, highlighting its broad appeal and impact on popular culture.

== Etymology ==
The term karaoke comes from Japanese カラオケ (karaoke), formed from 空 (kara, “empty”) and オケ (oke), a clipped form of オーケストラ (ōkesutora, “orchestra”). The compound is commonly glossed as “empty orchestra.”

== History ==
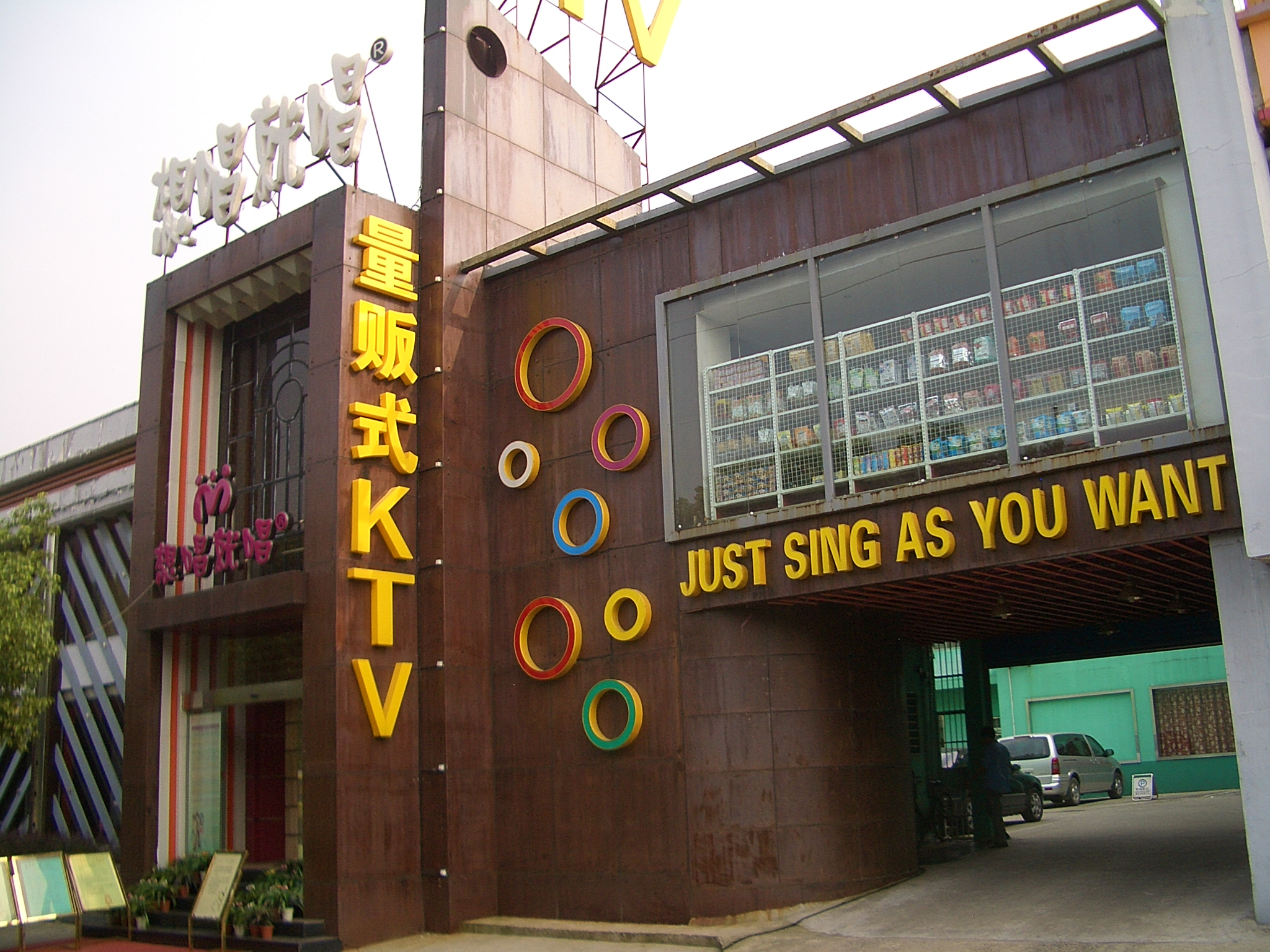
A karaoke bar in Wuhan, Hubei, China

=== 1960s: Development of audio-visual-recording devices ===
From 1961 to 1966, the American TV network NBC carried a karaoke-like series, Sing Along with Mitch, featuring host Mitch Miller and a chorus, which superimposed the lyrics to their songs near the bottom of the TV screen for home audience participation. The primary difference between karaoke and sing-along songs is the absence of the lead vocalist.

Sing-alongs (present since the beginning of singing) fundamentally changed with the introduction of new technology. In the late 1960s and into the 1970s, stored audible materials began to dominate the music recording industry and revolutionized the portability and ease of use of band and instrumental music by musicians and entertainers as the demand for entertainers increased globally. This may have been attributable to the introduction of music cassette tapes, technology that arose from the need to customize music recordings and the desire for a "handy" format that would allow fast and convenient duplication of music and thereby meet the requirements of the entertainers' lifestyles and the 'footloose' character of the entertainment industry.

=== 1970s: Development of the karaoke machine ===
Despite the Japanese provenance of the term karaoke (first attested in 1977), the invention of karaoke-styled machines is controversial. It is usually credited to two people, depending on the sources: Daisuke Inoue of Japan or Roberto del Rosario of the Philippines, neither of whom significantly benefited from the worldwide surge of popularity of the karaoke starting from the 1980s. The profits in the karaoke industry went to later machines developed by larger Japanese corporations. Other people have also claimed to have invented karaoke-styled machines at various dates, but only del Rosario has a patent on his machine. The fact that the karaoke machine is simply an aggregate of existing technologies and is built on the older concept of sing-alongs makes it likely that it was developed independently multiple times.

==== Daisuke Inoue ====
In a 1996 interview with a Singapore-based all-karaoke TV channel, the Japanese nightclub musician Daisuke Inoue claimed to have invented the first karaoke-style machine in the city of Kobe in 1971. He was also credited for the invention of karaoke when he was later also featured on a Time magazine article in 1999.

Inoue, a bandleader, drummer, and Electone keyboardist, specialized in leading sing-alongs at nightclubs in Sannomiya, the entertainment district of the city of Kobe. In 1970, he and six bandmates played instruments in fancy drinking establishments to accompany middle-aged businessmen who would sing traditional Japanese songs. He claimed to have first thought of the idea of a karaoke-style machine when he was asked by a prominent client to play for him on an overnight trip to an onsen. Not being able to do so, he instead provided a tape of his accompaniment to the client. Realizing its potential, he thought of merging these pre-taped accompaniments with a jukebox.

Lacking the skills to make the machine himself, one of his bandmates introduced him to a friend who owned an electronics shop. He described his idea to him and commissioned 11 home-made machines which he called "8 Juke." Each machine cost around $425 per unit and consisted of a box containing an amplifier, a microphone, a coin box, and a car stereo which used specially made 8-track tapes. The machines metered out several minutes of singing time and used ¥100 coins.

He initially recorded his own versions of popular songs with his bandmates for the tapes. Starting from 1971, Inoue loaned the machines to establishments for free in exchange for a portion of the monthly earnings from the machines. He placed the first 8 Jukes in Sannomiya's "snack bars", but they initially failed to take off. Inoue then hired hostesses to ostentatiously sing on them, which successfully sparked interest. This also caused a great deal of friction with Inoue's fellow musicians, who saw it as drawing customers away from them.

When profits improved at around four years of operation, he hired professional musicians and rented a recording studio to create the 8-tracks for the machines. He made the songs in keys that made them easier for casual singers and included a rudimentary reverb function to help mask singers' deficiencies. By this time, the number of units he rented had increased from the initial eleven to around 25,000. Club owners from Kobe had started bringing his machines to new clubs in Osaka which became the birthplace of the karaoke boom in Japan. He also managed to convince large record labels to include their songs in the tracks for the 8 Jukes. For these reasons, Inoue is often considered to be the inventor of the modern business model for karaoke.

Inoue never patented his machine. While initially successful and earning approximately half a million dollars a year, Inoue lost interest in the business. He eventually handed over the company to his brother. By the 1980s, the idea of coin-operated sing-along machines was picked up by larger Japanese corporations who started manufacturing commercial versions of their own with better technologies like LaserDiscs.

In 2004, Daisuke Inoue was awarded the tongue-in-cheek Ig Nobel Peace Prize for inventing karaoke, "thereby providing an entirely new way for people to learn to tolerate each other."

==== Roberto del Rosario ====
In 1975, the Filipino entrepreneur and piano manufacturer Roberto del Rosario also claimed to have invented the first karaoke-type machine known as the "Sing-Along System" (SAS). The machine included multiple features enclosed in a single portable cabinet casing; including an amplifier, a speaker, a double or single tape deck, an optional tuner or radio, and a microphone mixer that enhances the singer's voice using effects like reverb and echo. The machine used cassette tapes of instrumental versions of popular songs which would later become more widely known as Minus-One. The machine did not have video, but it included songbooks with lyrics.

The SAS was originally developed since the late 1960s as a teaching device for students taking singing lessons at del Rosario's Trebel School of Music. It was refashioned for amateur and recreational use from 1975 to 1977. Unlike Inoue's "8 Juke", it was not coin-operated.

Del Rosario was himself a pianist and was a member of the amateur jazz group Executive Combo Band (composed mainly of politicians and prominent businessmen). He owned a company, Trebel Industries, that was the leading manufacturer of pianos and harpsichords in the Philippines. Del Rosario also invented and patented other audio equipment before and after the SAS. His other inventions included the 1972 "One-Man Band" (OMB), an acoustic piano that automatically plays a full orchestra accompaniment; the "Piano Tuners' Guide", an electronic push-button device for piano tuning; and "Voice Color Tapes", ready-made multiplex tapes with songs recorded and programmed to match a specific vocal range.

Unlike Inoue, del Rosario patented the "Sing-Along System" (issued in 1983 and 1986) and is recognized as the sole holder of a patent for a karaoke system in the world after he won a patent infringement case against a Chinese company in the 1990s. Despite this, he also did not profit significantly from his invention. Like Inoue, his machines were eventually replaced by more advanced commercial versions made by larger corporations that became available by the 1980s.

In 1985, Del Rosario was awarded the Gold Medal for Best Inventor by the World Intellectual Property Organization (a United Nations agency responsible for protecting international intellectual property) for the Sing-Along System, among other awards. He was also elected to the executive board of the International Federation of Inventors' Associations (IFIA). He also lobbied for more government support for inventors in the Congress of the Philippines, leading to the successful passage of Republic Act No. 7459, better known as the Inventor and Inventions Incentives Act of 1992.

==== Other possible inventors ====
Japanese engineer Shigeichi Negishi, who ran a consumer electronics assembly business, also claimed to have made the first karaoke-styled machine in 1967; He subsequently began mass producing coin-operated versions under the brand name "Sparko Box", making it the first commercially available karaoke machine. For media, it used 8-track cassette tapes of commercially available instrumental recordings. Lyrics were provided in a paper booklet. However, he ran into distribution troubles and ceased production of the Sparko Box shortly thereafter. Despite being credited by some as the first to automate and commercialize the karaoke singalong, Negishi, who died in 2024, never patented his invention.

Another possible early pioneer was Toshiharu Yamashita, who worked as a singing coach, and in 1970 sold an 8-track playback deck with microphone for sing-alongs.

=== 1980s-present: Later developments ===
Shortly after the development of the LaserDisc, Pioneer started to offer Video Karaoke machines in the 1980s. These machinese are capable of displaying lyrics over a video that accompanies the music.

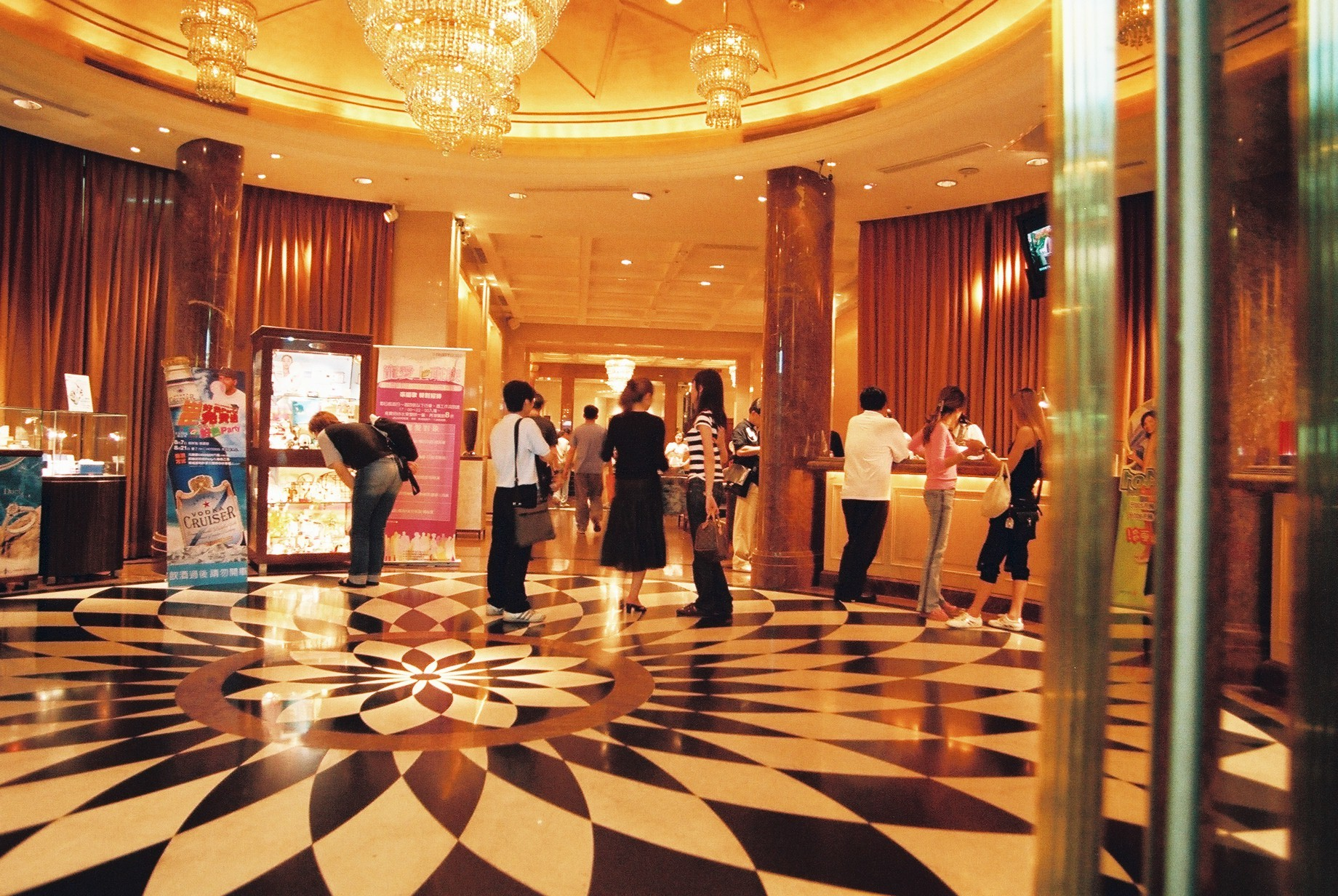
Entrance hall of a karaoke box in Taipei, Taiwan

In 1992, a scientist named Yuichi Yasutomo created a networked karaoke system for Brother Industries. Called tsūshin karaoke (通信カラオケ, lit. 'communications karaoke'), it served up songs in MIDI format via phone lines to modem-equipped karaoke machines. This new technology swept Japan; by 1998, 94% of karaoke was being sung on networked karaoke machines. As an early form of music on demand, it could be called the first successful audio streaming service. It also allowed for big data analysis of songs' popularity in realtime.

Karaoke soon spread to the rest of Asia and other countries all over the world. In-home karaoke machines soon followed but lacked success in the American and Canadian markets. When creators became aware of this problem, karaoke machines were no longer being sold strictly for the purpose of karaoke but as home theater systems to enhance television watching to "movie theater-like quality". Home theater systems took off, and karaoke went from being the main purpose of the stereo system to a side feature.

As more music became available for karaoke machines, more people within the industry saw karaoke as a profitable form of lounge and nightclub entertainment. It is not uncommon for some bars to have karaoke performances seven nights a week, commonly with high-end sound equipment superior to the small, stand-alone consumer versions. Dance floors and lighting effects are also becoming common sights in karaoke bars. Lyrics are often displayed on multiple television screens around the bar.

== Technology ==
A basic karaoke machine consists of a music player, microphone inputs, a means of altering the pitch of the played music, and an audio output. Some low-end machines attempt to provide vocal suppression so that one can feed regular songs into the machine and remove the voice of the original singer; however this was, historically, rarely effective. Most common machines are CD+G, Laser Disc, VCD or DVD players with microphone inputs and an audio mixer built in, though VHS VCRs are sometimes used. CD+G players use a special track called subcode to encode the lyrics and pictures displayed on the screen while other formats natively display both audio and video.

Most karaoke machines have technology that electronically changes the pitch of the music so that amateur singers can choose a key that is appropriate for their vocal range, while maintaining the original tempo of the song. (Old systems which used cassettes changed the pitch by altering playback speed, but none are still on the market, and their commercial use is virtually nonexistent.)

A popular game using karaoke is to type in a random number and call up a song, which participants attempt to sing. In some machines, this game is pre-programmed and may be limited to a genre so that they cannot call up an obscure national anthem that none of the participants can sing. This game has come to be called "Kamikaze Karaoke" or "Karaoke Roulette" in some parts of the United States and Canada.

Many low-end entertainment systems have a karaoke mode that attempts to remove the vocal track from regular audio CDs, using an Out Of Phase Stereo (OOPS) technique. This is done by center channel extraction, which exploits the fact that in most stereo recordings the vocals are in the center. This means that the voice, as part of the music, has equal volume on both stereo channels and no phase difference. To get the quasi-karaoke (mono) track, the left channel of the original audio is subtracted from the right channel. The Sega Saturn also has a "mute vocals" feature that is based on the same principle and is also able to adjust the pitch of the song to match the singer's vocal range.

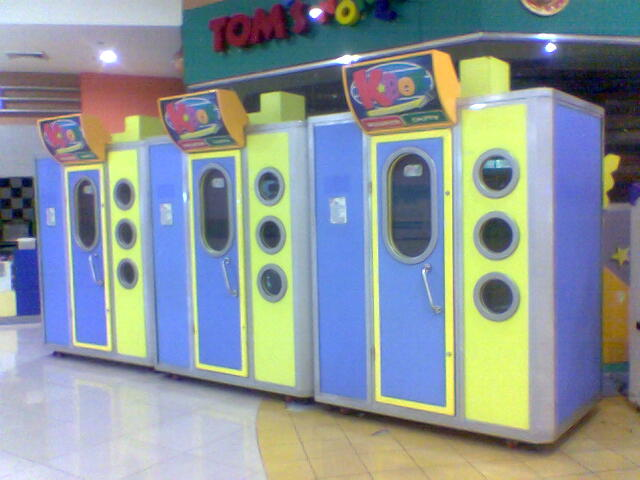
A row of 3 karaoke booths at a shopping center in Angeles City, Philippines

This crude approach results in the often-poor performance of voice removal. Common effects are hearing the reverb effects on the voice track (due to stereo reverb on the vocals not being in the center); also, other instruments (snare/bass drum, bass guitar and solo instruments) that happen to be mixed into the center get removed, degrading this approach to hardly more than a gimmick in those devices. Recent years have seen the development of new techniques based on the fast Fourier transform. Although still not perfect, the results are usually much better than the old technique, because the stereo left-right comparison can be done on individual frequencies.

=== Early age ===
Early karaoke machines used 8-track cartridges (The Singing Machine) and cassette tapes, with printed lyric sheets, but technological advances replaced this with CDs, VCDs, LaserDiscs and, currently, DVDs. In the late 1980s and 1990s, Pioneer Electronics dominated the international karaoke music video market, producing high quality karaoke music videos (inspired by the music videos such as those on MTV).

In 1992, Taito introduced the X2000, which fetched music via a dial-up telephone network. Its repertoire of music and graphics was limited, but its smaller size and the advantage of continuous updates saw it gradually replace traditional machines. Karaoke machines which are connected via fiber-optic links enabling them to provide instant high-quality music and video are becoming increasingly popular.

Karaoke direct is an Internet division established in 1997 been serving the public online since 1998. They released the first karaoke player that supports MP3+G and now the KDX2000 model supporting karaoke in DIVX, Format.

One of the long-running karaoke device is the DVD and HDD karaoke systems, which comes with thousands of songs that are popular in business such as karaoke machine rentals and KTV bars, and became popular in Asia, especially the Philippines. This device also provides MIDI format with on-screen lyrics on a background video and scoring after you sing, the score will appear from 60 (lowest) to 100 (highest) based on timing and pitch.

=== Video games ===
The earliest karaoke-based music video game, called Karaoke Studio, was released for the Family Computer in 1987, but its limited computing ability made for a short catalog of songs and therefore reduced replay value. As a result, karaoke games were considered little more than collector's items until they saw release in higher-capacity DVD formats.

Karaoke Revolution, created for the PlayStation 2 by Harmonix and released by Konami in North America in 2003, is a console game in which a single player sings along with on-screen guidance and receives a score based on pitch, timing, and rhythm. The game soon spawned several follow-ups including Karaoke Revolution Vol. 2, Karaoke Revolution Vol. 3, Karaoke Revolution Party Edition, CMT Presents Karaoke Revolution: Country and Karaoke Revolution Presents: American Idol. While the original Karaoke Revolution was also eventually released for the Microsoft Xbox console in late 2004, the new online-enabled version included the ability to download additional song packs through the console's exclusive Xbox Live service.

A similar series, SingStar, published by Sony Computer Entertainment Europe, is particularly popular in the European and Australasian markets. Other music video game titles that involve singing by the player include Boogie and its sequel Boogie Superstar, Disney Sing It, Get on da Mic, the Guitar Hero series starting with World Tour, High School Musical: Sing It!, Lips, the Rock Band series, SingSong, UltraStar, and Xbox Music Mixer.

An Xbox Live App with the same name created by iNiS and powered by The Karaoke Channel/Stingray Karaoke was released on 12 December 2012. The app uses Unreal Engine 3.

=== VCDs ===
Many VCD players in Southeast Asia have a built-in karaoke function. On stereo recordings, one speaker will play the music with the vocal track, and the other speaker will play the music without the vocal track. So, to sing karaoke, users play the music-only track through both speakers. In the past, there were only pop-song karaoke VCDs. Nowadays, different types of karaoke VCDs are available. Cantonese opera karaoke VCD is now a big hit among the elderly in China.

=== On computers and the Internet ===
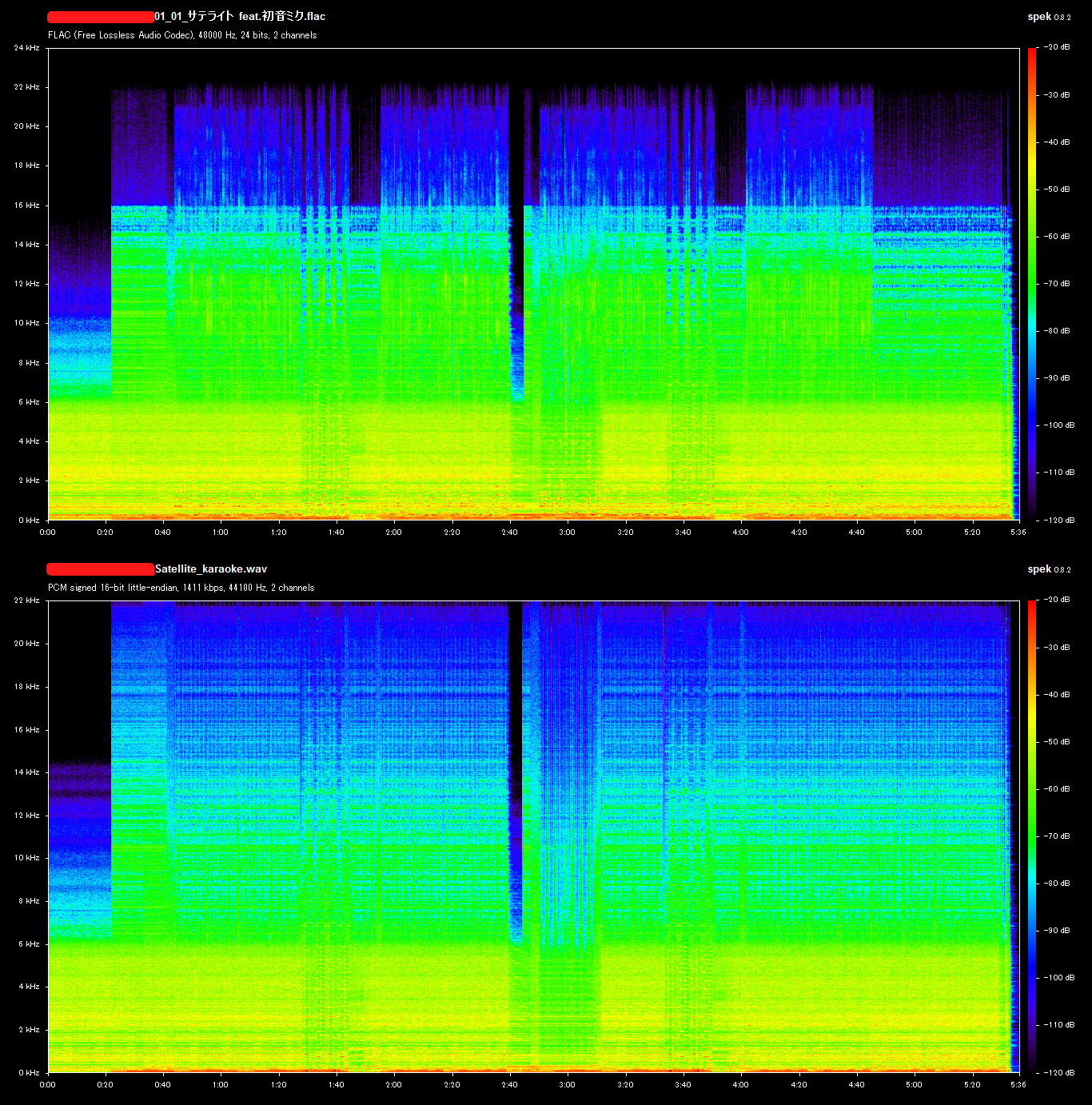
Electronic music production has made distribution of instrumental 'stems' simple.

Since 2003, much software has been released for hosting karaoke shows and playing karaoke songs on a personal computer. Instead of having to carry around hundreds of CD-Gs or LaserDiscs, karaoke jockeys can rip their entire libraries onto their hard drives and play the songs and lyrics from the computer. Additionally, new software permits singers to sing and listen to one another over the Internet. Karaoke devices in the 2000s saw a shift towards the use of hard drives to store large collections of karaoke tracks and touch screen devices that allows users to select their songs. This trend was driven by the declining cost of hard drive storage and improvement in touchscreen technology in the consumer space. In 2005, Freeware Karaoke software from Thailand on Windows "All In One Karaoke Player" Version 2.0 has released It can play all MIDI Karaoke file (.MID, .KAR, .RMS etc.), Video Karaoke file (VCD, MP4, DVD, MPG, DAT, WMV) and Audio Karaoke file (MP3, OGG+HotBeat).

In 2006, first released of eXtreme Karaoke is a paid software by bank transfer pay 500 THB and send to E-mail for activate license key and also can play same with All In One Karaoke Player. and in 2008 eXtreme Karaoke changed from License file to HardLock (USB Dongle) the price is 2,000 THB for software. In 2006, Recisio was founded as a downloadable karaoke software.

In 2010, a new concept of home karaoke system through the use of live streaming from a cloud server emerged. The earliest cloud based streaming device, Starbox, was released by Starbox KOD on 14 January 2010. The use of cloud streaming allows for smaller devices with over the air updates compared to costly and bulky hard drive-based systems. Recisio transitioned into Karafun, an online subscription based system in 2011. In 2015, Singa (karaoke) was launched, providing karaoke for Android and iOS mobile devices, in addition to a web browser product for a subscription fee. Other similar service providers include Smule and Starmaker.

In August 2017, ROXI home music system launched in the UK, and later that year in the US, providing on-demand music streaming and a karaoke singalong feature called Sing with the Stars. ROXI matches songs in its cloud based licensed music streaming catalogue to a lyrics database to provide real time scrolling on-screen lyrics. The music system also uses a hand-held Wii style point and click controller with built-in microphone allowing users to select and sing along to thousands of songs from its catalogue.

In July 2023, YouTube channel Sing King Karaoke reached 11 million subscribers, making it the largest karaoke channel on the platform.

=== On mobile phones ===
In 2003, several companies started offering a karaoke service on mobile phones, using a Java MIDlet that runs with a text file containing the words and a MIDI file with the music. More usual is to contain the lyrics within the same MIDI file. Often the file extension is then changed from .mid to .kar, both are compatible with the standard for MIDI files.

Researchers have also developed karaoke games for cell phones to boost music database training. In 2006, the Interactive Audio Lab at Northwestern University released a game called Karaoke Callout for the Nokia Series 60 phone. The project has since then expanded into a web-based game and will be released soon as an iPhone application.

Karaoke is now available for the Android, iPhone and other playback devices at many internet storefronts.

=== In automobiles ===
Taxicabs equipped with sound systems and a microphone appeared in South Korea in the 1990s.

Chinese automobile maker Geely Automobile received much press in 2003 for being the first to equip a car, their Beauty Leopard, with a karaoke machine as standard equipment. Europe's first commercial "karaokecab" which was a London TX4 taxi with a karaoke machine inside for occupants of the cab to use to sing whilst in the cab. The idea and installation were made by Richard Harfield of karaokeshop.com and was featured on Channel 4's Big Breakfast and several German TV stations featured the karaokecab. Granada TV also featured the cab, which is now in its 4th vehicle and operates in Bolton, Greater Manchester as Clint's Karaoke Cab. Karaoke is often also found as a feature in aftermarket in-car DVD players.

In 2010, karaoke taxis were available in London, England in the 'Kabeoke' fleet of private hire vehicles.

Tesla's newer cars have an infotainment system that features a "Car-a-oke" app.

=== Mini karaoke box ===
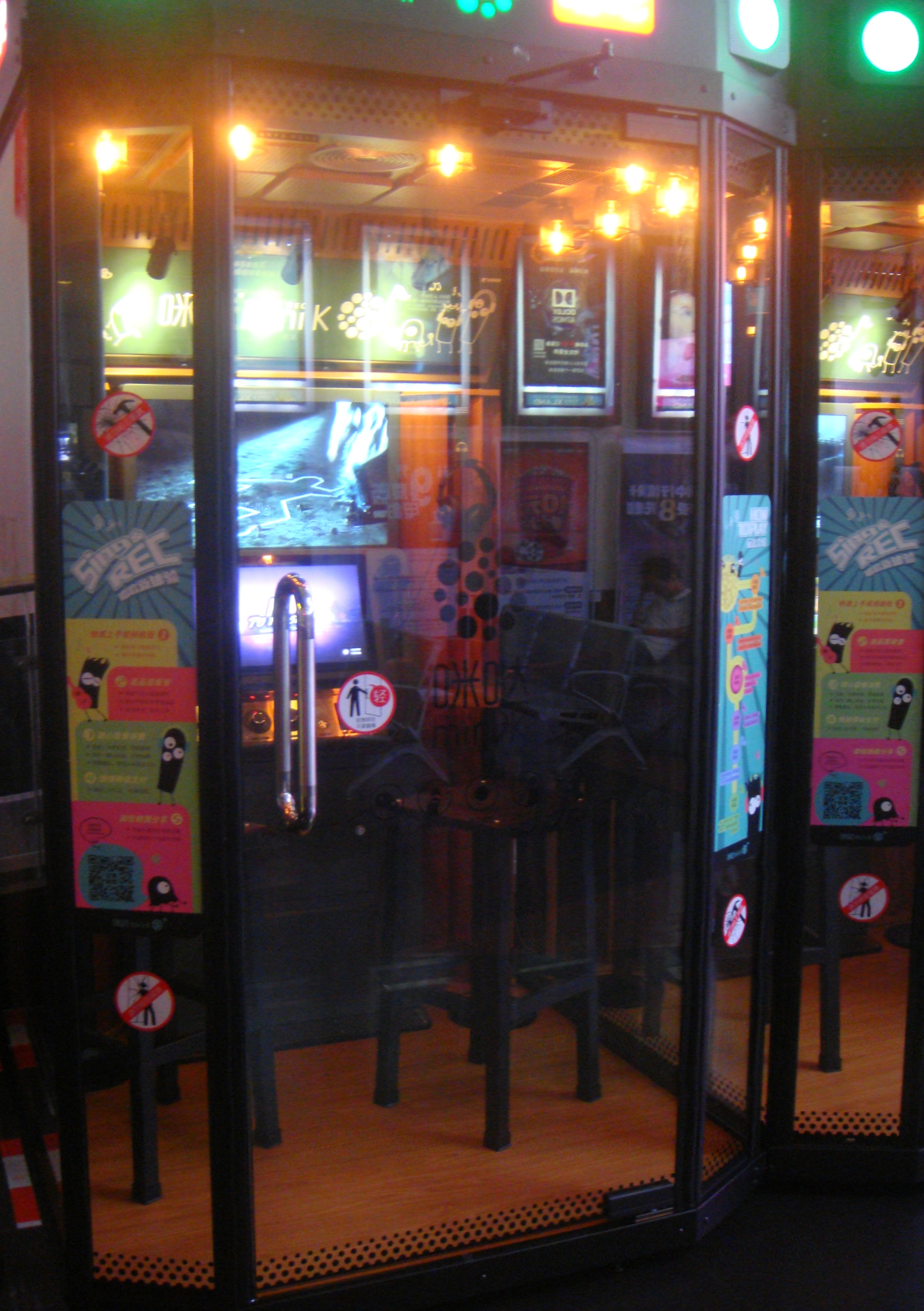
Mini karaoke box

Mini karaoke box or karaoke booth is a device similar in shape and size to a phone booth, equipped with a karaoke machine inside. Typically made from soundproof glass, it can be installed anywhere and is suitable for use by one or two people. It is popular in East Asia.

=== Alternative playback devices ===
The CD+G format of a karaoke disc, which contains the lyrics on a specially encoded subcode track, has heretofore required special—and expensive—equipment to play. Commercial players have come down in price, though, and some unexpected devices (including the Sega Saturn video game console and XBMC Media Center on the first Xbox) can decode the graphics; in fact, karaoke machines, including video and sometimes recording capability, are often popular electronics items for sale in toy stores and electronics stores.

Additionally, there is software for Windows, Pocket PC, Linux, and Macintosh PCs that can decode and display karaoke song tracks, though usually these must be ripped from the CD first, and possibly compressed.

In addition to CD+G and software-based karaoke, microphone-based karaoke players enjoy popularity mainly in North America and some Asian countries such as the Philippines. Microphone-based karaoke players only need to be connected to a TV—and in some cases to a power outlet; in other cases they run on batteries. These devices often support advanced features, such as pitch correction and special sound effects. Some companies offer karaoke content for paid download to extend the song library in microphone-based karaoke systems.

CD+G, DVD, VCD and microphone-based players are most popular for home use. Due to song selection and quality of recordings, CD+G is the most popular format for English and Spanish. It is also important to note that CD+G has limited graphical capabilities, whereas VCD and DVD usually have a moving picture or video background. VCD and DVD are the most common format for Asian singers due to music availability and largely due to the moving picture/video background.

== Terms ==
Jūhachiban
(十八番. also ohako). Many karaoke singers have one song which they are especially good at and which they use to show off their singing abilities. In Japan, this is called jūhachiban in reference to Kabuki Jūhachiban, the 18 best kabuki plays. 十八番 means eighteen in Japanese as well.
Karamovie or Movioke
Karaoke using scenes from movies. Amateur actors replace their favorite movie stars in popular movies. Usually facilitated by software or remote control muting and screen blanking/freezing. Karamovie originated in 2003.
Karaoke jockey or KJ
A karaoke jockey plays and manages the music for a venue. The role of the KJ often includes announcing song titles and whose turn it is to use the microphone.
Hitokara
Singing karaoke alone is called hitokara (ヒトカラ, abbreviation for ひとりカラオケ; ひとり hitori, "one person" or "alone" + カラオケ karaoke) in Japan. Recently this trend has become very popular amongst amateur singers in Japan, India and China, though mostly Japan.

== In culture ==
=== Public places ===
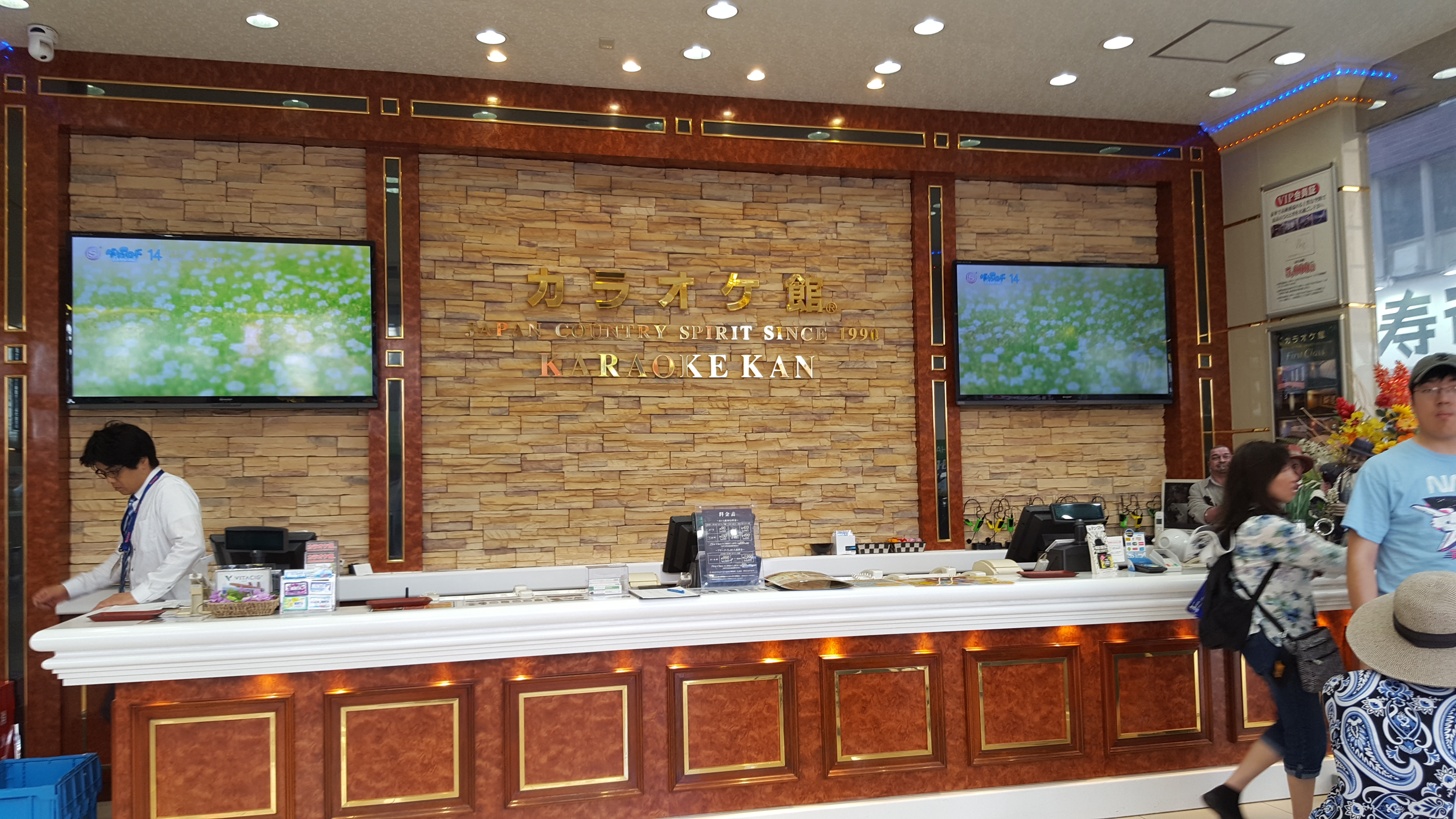
Lobby of a karaoke box in Japan

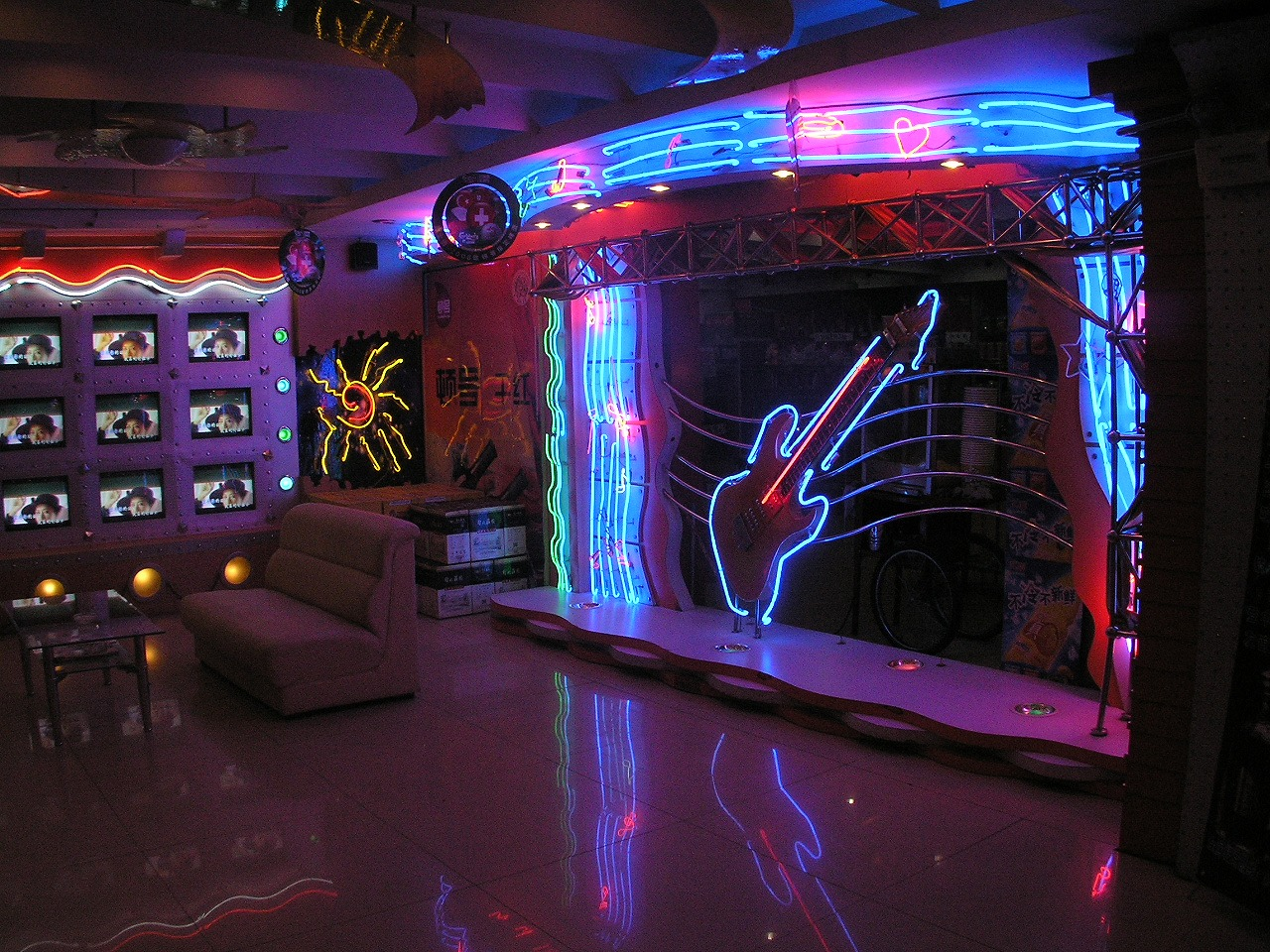
Entrance to a karaoke box in China

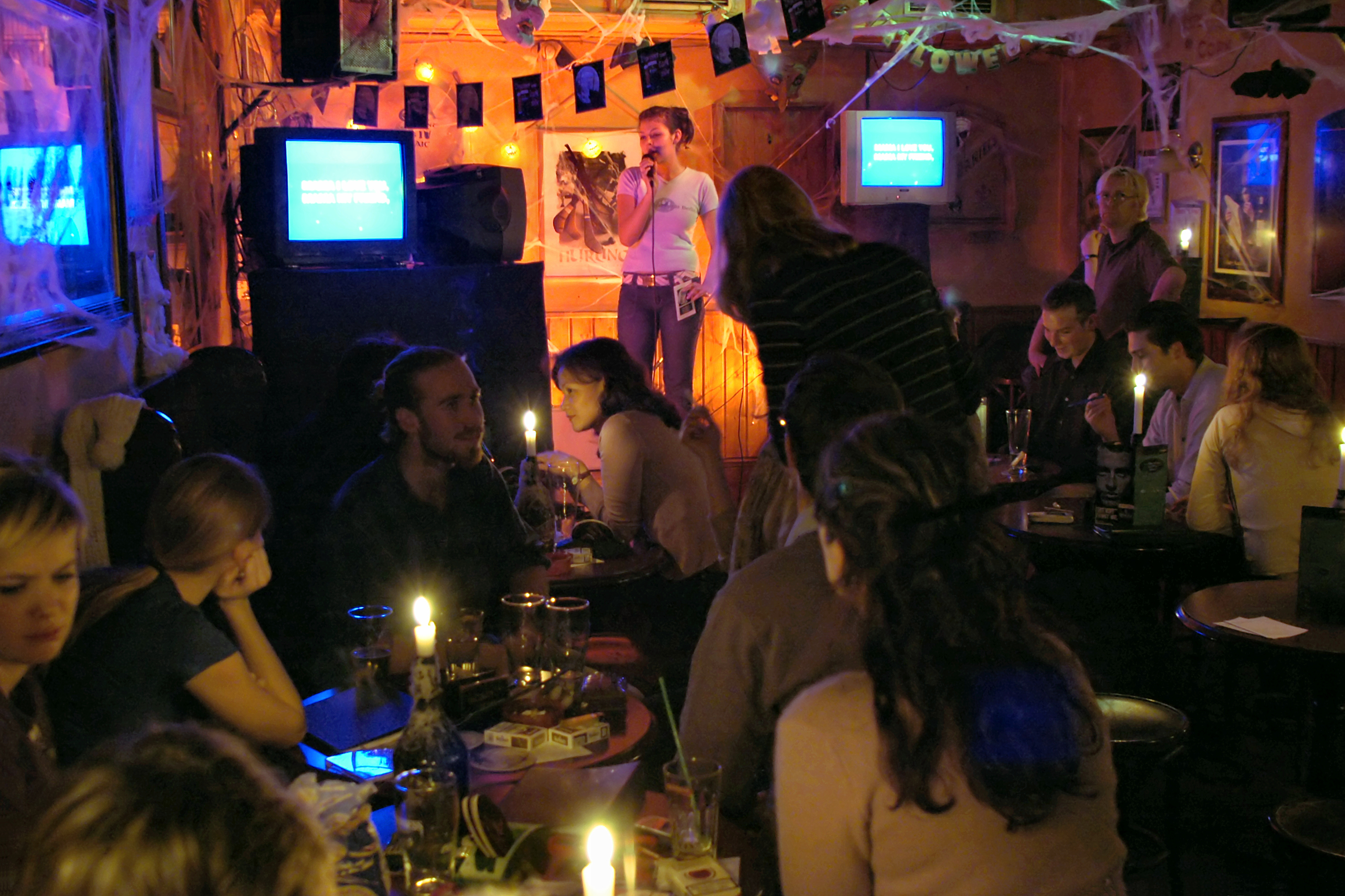
Karaoke in an Irish pub in Hamburg

==== Asia ====
In Asia, a karaoke box is the most popular type of karaoke venue. A karaoke box is a small or medium-sized room containing karaoke equipment rented by the hour or half-hour, providing a more intimate atmosphere. Karaoke venues of this type are often dedicated businesses, some with multiple floors and a variety of amenities including food service, but hotels and business facilities sometimes provide karaoke boxes as well. In South Korea, karaoke boxes are called noraebangs. In mainland China and Taiwan, a karaoke establishment is called a KTV.

In some traditional Chinese restaurants, there are so-called "mahjong-karaoke rooms" where the elderly play mahjong while teenagers sing karaoke. The result is fewer complaints about boredom, but more noise. Noise regulations can be an issue, especially when karaoke is brought into residential areas.

Violent reactions to karaoke singing have made headlines in Malaysia, Thailand and the Philippines, with reports of killings by listeners disturbed by the singing. In the Philippines, at least half a dozen killings of people singing "My Way" caused newspapers there to label the phenomenon "My Way killings"; such that some bars have banned the song, and some singers refrained from vocalizing it among strangers.

Prostitution became an issue implicating karaoke in Cambodia, Sri Lanka, Thailand and other parts of Southeast Asia. In Thailand, "karaoke girls" are brought in not only from Thailand itself but from neighboring countries and are sent to other parts of the world.

Asian karaoke establishments are often fronts for gentlemen's clubs, where men pay for female hosts to drink, sing, and dance with them. In Japan, such a business is called a piano bar.

After the COVID-19 outbreak, karaoke bars in Japan reopened with rules such as mask wearing and mic covers, with the singer facing the same direction as onlookers.

===== Philippines =====
Instrumental tracks on cassette tapes were initially the format used by Roberto del Rosario's "Sing-Along System". By the 1980s, including instrumental-only tracks on the B-side of commercial song and album releases had become standard practice in the Philippine recording industry, popularly known as Minus-One.

Del Rosario's "Sing-Along System" led to the rapid growth of popularity of "sing-alongs" in the Philippines. Singing contests were staged in town fiestas, where amateurs from all walks of life competed. In later years, the audio-only Sing-Along Systems were replaced by Japanese-style coin-operated machines with video and running lyrics that came to be known as "videoke". It became a popular domestic recreational pastime among Filipinos. It also led to the popularity of nighttime videoke bars.

===== Taiwan =====
In Taiwan, karaoke bars similar to those in Japan and South Korea are called KTVs, which stands for karaoke television. Karaoke is a highly popular form of recreation in Taiwan. The biggest KTV chains in Taiwan are Partyworld Cashbox, Holiday KTV and NewCBParty. People who participate in KTV get their own private karaoke room, usually consisting of a large screen, speakers, mood lights, and food and drink service. There is a song selection of both English and Chinese music. KTV is a trend that is getting more popular around the world.

===== South Korea =====
A noraebang (Hangul: 노래방) refers to a singing venue in South Korea where private sound-proof rooms are available for rent, equipped for singing – typically microphones, remote controls, a large video screen, couches, and mood décor such as disco lights and tambourines. The term noraebang is a Korean compound word, blending norae (Hangul: 노래, English: song) and bang (Hangul: 방, English: room). It is the regional equivalent to the Karaoke box in Japan.

Singing is an important part of social life in Korea, where people will perform, and be persuaded to perform, an impromptu song at virtually any social occasion. As such, noraebangs are popular and widespread, often identifiable by bright neon signs with musical notes or microphones.

Often the last stop after a night of alcohol-lined entertainment for youths and businesspeople alike, noraebangs are also a favorite family pastime, and many are dry venues. People also frequent noraebangs as a form of stress relief, and some noraebangs cater to those who seek to sing alone.

==== North America and Europe ====
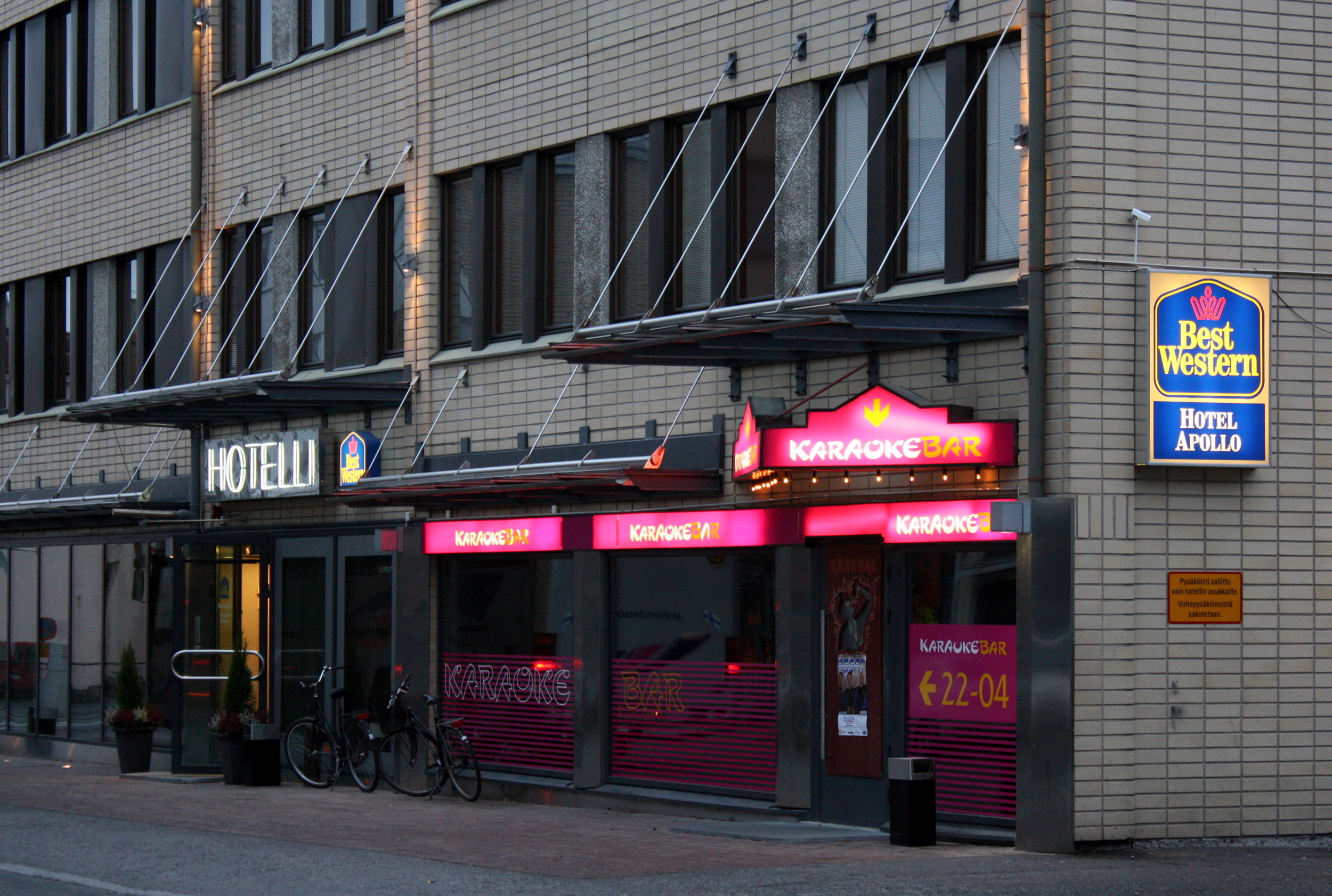
A karaoke bar in Oulu, Finland

A karaoke bar, restaurant, club or lounge is a bar or restaurant that provides karaoke equipment so that people can sing publicly, sometimes on a small stage. Most of these establishments allow patrons to sing for free, with the expectation that sufficient revenue will be made selling food and drink to the singers. Less commonly, the patron wishing to sing must pay a small fee for each song they sing. Both are financially beneficial for the establishment by not having to pay a professional singer or a cabaret tax which is usually applied to any entertainment of more than one person.

Many establishments offer karaoke on a weekly schedule, while some have shows every night. Such establishments commonly invest more in both equipment and song discs, and are often extremely popular, with an hour or more wait between a singer's opportunities to take the stage (called the rotation).

Private karaoke rooms, similar to Asia's karaoke boxes, are commonplace in major cities.

Karaoke is very popular in Scotland with dedicated karaoke venues in most reasonably large towns. Aberdeen is home to a number of notable karaoke bars including Weagleys, The Spirit Level, Bardot's Karaoke Bar, Sing City. In North America, the Tri State area is known to have many lounges that participate in weekly karaoke shows. New Jersey has many establishments that are frequented by people of different backgrounds who also participate in karaoke. Hugo's Lounge and Love Lounge located in Plainfield, New Jersey are just a couple of the many establishments with weekly karaoke schedules.

Throughout much of North America, live band karaoke is also popular. With live band karaoke, singers sing with a live band instead of the prerecorded backing track.

Rock critic Rob Sheffield claims that the 1986 music video for the song "Wild Wild Life" by Talking Heads was the first depiction of karaoke in American popular culture. The video features a variety of characters taking turns singing portions of the song to an audience at a bar. However a karaoke bar in Honolulu called "Sing Sing" is depicted in an episode of the American TV series Magnum, P.I. entitled "The Man from Marseilles" first broadcast on March 14, 1985.

In Italy, karaoke had become popular by early 1994, popularized by television personality Rosario Fiorello who had a karaoke program that appeared weekly on national television.

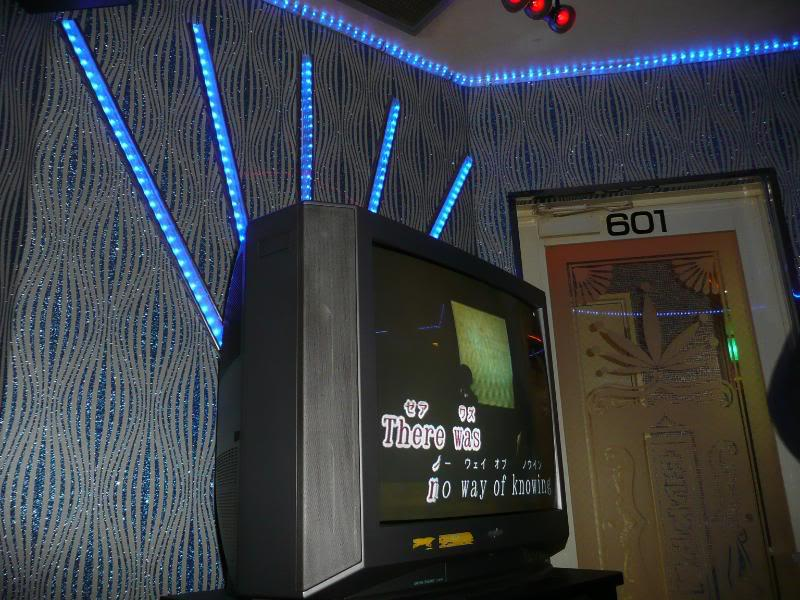
The karaoke box at Karaoke Kan (Tokyo) where Bill Murray and Scarlett Johansson sang in Lost in Translation

Karaoke made a brief appearance in Sofia Coppola's 2003 movie Lost in Translation, and it was, three years before, the primary focus of Bruce Paltrow's 2000 film Duets, written by John Bynum and starring Paltrow's daughter Gwyneth and Huey Lewis, "anchor-man" of Huey Lewis and the News.

Also popular among the international performing arts community in Europe, a group of Finnish producers organized an international karaoke competition called KWC (Karaoke World Championships). Their 2011 international karaoke competition has attracted ABC producers to help host America's karaoke competition in Las Vegas Nevada called Karaoke Battle USA. The competition is promised to select 1 male and 1 female contestant to represent the U.S. in the international arena. Largely supported by the Broadway community in Times Square, Pulse Karaoke Lounge sponsored 2011's New York state karaoke finals to select individuals representing New York in the eastern finals.

According to The New York Times, the dozens of karaoke bars in Portland, Oregon make it not just "the capital of karaoke" in the United States, but "one of the most exciting music scenes in America."

From the mid 2010s to the early 2020s, late night talk show host James Corden ran a popular segment named ‘Carpool Karaoke’ on his program, The Late Late Show With James Corden, where Corden would sing karaoke with famous celebrities such as Mariah Carey and Paul McCartney while sitting in a moving automobile. Per Corden, the segment was inspired by pop singer George Michael.

==== Australia ====
In Australia, karaoke was gradually popularized in the late 1980s. A number of Filipino migrants brought with them their own 'minus-one' music from cassette music tapes and video tapes purchased mainly in the Philippines. A number of Philippine-imported karaoke units with two cassette drives were used in private households. Video TV tapes, mainly consisted of popular and contemporary songs rendered by Filipino artists, and with a mix of English and Tagalog songs were soon used. Projected lyrics on TV screens became very common as the main source of karaoke renditions. These tapes were soon replaced by CD+Gs, but a plug-n-play karaoke microphone that housed a factory built-in songchip loaded with hundreds of karaoke songs quickly became a favourite. This unit would usually be purchased in the Philippines and brought into Australia, becoming a common household item and is popularly used during gatherings.

Commercially, karaoke was first introduced into Australia in 1989 by Robin Hemmings who had seen karaoke operating in Fiji. Prior to this, karaoke was generally unknown to the broader population. Hemmings, of Adelaide, South Australia, offered systems manufactured by Pioneer which used 12in (30 cm) double-sided laser discs containing a maximum of 24 songs with accompanying video track and subtitled lyrics.

Despite some initial resistance, Adelaide hoteliers The Booze Brothers offered limited access to their hotels and the karaoke phenomenon was born. Hemmings business, Karaoke Hire Systems, operated seven machines on a casual rental basis to numerous hotels, clubs and private parties in and around Adelaide with an additional machine on snow-season lease at Jindabyne, NSW. Each system came complete with up to 24 discs containing a maximum of 576 music video tracks. In Adelaide, karaoke reached its zenith in 1991 with virtually every hotel offering at least one karaoke night per week with many having undertaken alterations to their premises with the addition of purpose built stages and sound systems. Karaoke rental suppliers had proliferated during this period and Hemmings is known to have sold his business in late 1991 as a going concern.

Karaoke's popularity in Adelaide waned from mid 1992 and was virtually extinguished by early 1993, until recently where karaoke bars have largely regained their former popularity among the city's increasing international population. In 2021, the University of Adelaide Karaoke Club was formed, re-popularizing karaoke among the student population of Adelaide.

In the mid-2000s, a number of karaoke bars sprouted in Sydney with karaoke boxes frequented by Japanese students and tourists and a few locals, especially on Thursday nights and weekends. A number of clubs such as RSL, League Clubs and restaurants and bars mainly feature karaoke nights to entice more customers and to entertain guests. Sunfly Karaoke is probably the major karaoke brand in Australia as well as the UK.

=== Production methods ===
Computer Music Player by Kumyoung in South Korea

Karaoke is very popular in Asian countries, and many artists distribute a karaoke track at the same time the song is released. The most common form of karaoke nowadays is released in MIDI format with on-screen lyrics on a DVD background video.

In Europe and North America, karaoke tracks are almost never done by the original artist, but are re-recorded by other musicians.

South Korean firms TJ Media, Magic Sing, Kumyoung produce digital music content in MIDI format and manufacture computer music players for the Asian market.

=== Contests ===
Since the rise of karaoke around the world, karaoke contests have become a phenomenon of mainstream culture, giving non-professional singers opportunity to showcase their talent, win prizes, and at times, travel the world. Contest participants are usually rated 50% by customer votes and 50% by judges' votes, but this may vary, depending on the venue and the level of competition.

Karaoke World Championship is one of the most popular karaoke contests and has been around since 2003. In September 2025, the Karaoke World Championships will be held in Bangkok, Thailand.

=== World records ===
As of 2009, the world record for the most people singing karaoke was at Bristol Motor Speedway in the United States. Over 160,000 people began to sing Garth Brooks' song "Friends in Low Places" before the NASCAR Sharpie 500 race began.

Hungary holds the record for the longest Karaoke marathon, with multiple participants for an event organized in the Honey Grill Restaurant by Gabor Dániel Szabó (REVVOX Music). It lasted for 1,011 hours, 1 minute, between 20 July 2011, and 31 August 2011. Each song was over 3 minutes long and the gap between songs was no longer than 30 seconds. No song was repeated in any two-hour period.

The record for the longest Karaoke solo marathon is held by the Italian Leonardo Polverelli, who sang 1,295 songs in 101 hours, 59 minutes, and 15 seconds.

=== Violence in karaoke bars ===
Between 2002 and 2012, numerous fatal incidents in the Philippines occurred in connection to karaoke bars and the song "My Way", popularized by Frank Sinatra. Similar violent and fatal incidents connected to karaoke bars have also occurred in other countries, including Malaysia, Thailand, and China.

== See also ==
- Closed captioning
- Fansub
- List of English words of Japanese origin
- Music Minus One
- PowerPoint karaoke
- Same language subtitling
- Subtitling
- Surtitles
- The Singing Machine Company
- Utagoe Kissa
