= The Singing Machine Company =

American karaoke company

The Singing Machine Company, Inc.
- Type: Public (Nasdaq: RIME)
- Industry: Karaoke; Karaoke Music; Consumer electronics
- Founded: California, United States (1982, as The Singing Machine Company, Inc.)
- Headquarters: 6301 NW 5th Way, Suite 2900, Fort Lauderdale, Florida
- Key people: Edward Steele CEO Till 2003: Gary Atkinson, CEO; Alex Andre, CFO; Bernardo Melo, Chief Revenue Officer
- Products: Karaoke Machines, Karaoke Music, Accessories
- Website: SingingMachine.com

The Singing Machine Company, Inc. sells consumer karaoke products. Based in Fort Lauderdale, Florida, and founded over forty years ago, the Company designs and distributes an assortment of at-home and in-car karaoke entertainment products. Their portfolio is marketed under both proprietary brands and popular licenses, including Carpool Karaoke and Sesame Street. Singing Machine products provide access to over 100,000 songs for streaming through its mobile app and select WiFi-capable products. The company is also developing the world's first globally available, fully-integrated in-car karaoke system. The company also has a philanthropic initiative, CARE-eoke by Singing Machine, to focus on the social impact of karaoke for children and adults of all ages who would benefit from singing.

Their products are sold in over 25,000 locations worldwide, including Amazon, Costco, Sam's Club, Target, and Walmart.

== History ==
The Singing Machine Company (SMC) was originally incorporated in California in 1982 with a focus on professional and semi-professional karaoke equipment. In 1988 the company began marketing karaoke equipment for home use. It is believed that SMD was the first company to introduce home karaoke products to the United States. In 2001, SMC entered into a multi-year license agreement with MTV. As a part of a shift in strategy, SMC approached the mass market through large retailers. In the following year, Business Week Magazine named The Singing Machine Company #1 on their list of Hot Not Growth Companies.

=== Karaoke Machines ===
The core of SMC's business is the distribution and sale of its karaoke machines to retailers and wholesalers such as Wal-Mart, Sam's Club, Best Buy, and Costco.

In the fall of 2015 The Singing Machine introduced its new digital line of products, no CD-G required allowing users to create playlists on the company's branded site and chose their favorite songs, download them to a USB, giving them the freedom of mixing and matching genres, singers, and enjoying the songs they want to sing.

=== Music ===
SMC has a music library thousands of recordings, which are licensed from their publishers for karaoke use. The library spans a variety of genres including: pop, rock, rap, country, Christian, Latin, motown, and oldies.

=== Bratz Licensed Products ===
In 2007 SMC signed a deal with MGA Entertainment to license the popular Bratz franchise. Such licensed products include karaoke products, digital drum sets, clock radios, TV/DVD combos, and portable DVD players.

=== Motown Licensed Products ===
Following a 2003 agreement between SMC and Universal Music Enterprises, the company released the "Motown Original Artist Karaoke" compilation series, which features karaoke tracks of Motown classic songs made from the original master recordings of the songs instead of cover versions, like most karaoke tracks. In addition, a Motown-themed karaoke machine has also been released.

=== Musical Instruments ===
SMC has a line of electronic drum sets under the brand name "SoundX".
