= Daisuke Inoue =

Japanese businessman (born 1940)

- Born: May 10, 1940 (age 86); Osaka, Empire of Japan
- Known for: Invention of karaoke

Daisuke Inoue (井上 大佑, Inoue Daisuke; born May 10, 1940) is a Japanese businessman best known as an inventor of the karaoke machine. Inoue, a musician in his youth employed in backing businesspeople who wanted to sing in bars, invented the machine as a means of allowing them to sing without live back-up. He did not patent the machine and so did not directly profit, but he continued to work in the industry it generated, including patenting a protective pesticide for karaoke machines. Named one of Time magazine's "Most Influential Asians of the Century" in 1999, he was awarded the Ig Nobel Peace Prize in 2004 and in 2005 was the subject of the Japanese biographical film Karaoke.

Recent studies have revealed the existence of several people who invented and commercialized karaoke machines prior to Inoue.

== Life and career ==
Daisuke Inoue was born in Osaka, Japan on May 10, 1940. He was raised in Nishinomiya, the son of a pancake vendor with a stall behind a train station. He started playing drums in high school, but was not particularly skillful, as a result of which he took on the business management of his band, which provided back-up music in a club for businessmen who wanted to take the stage. He developed the basic idea of karaoke, which means "empty orchestra", when one client wanted Inoue to back him during a business trip that Inoue could not attend. He supplied the businessman with taped accompaniment instead. Thinking that the idea might have widespread appeal, he began in 1971 renting to bars in Kobe eleven machines outfitted with tapes and amplifiers which he had assembled along with some friends. They proved popular, and a trend was born.

Inoue did not patent his invention and so did not directly profit from the invention that started a booming industry. A Filipino, Roberto del Rosario filed a patent for a karaoke machine system, the Sing Along System, which del Rosario developed in 1975. Inoue did continue in the field, inventing a pesticide to repel cockroaches and rats that destroy the electronics within karaoke machines. In the 1980s, he ran a business engaged in securing licensing for music in eight-track karaoke machines. In the 1990s, with eight-track karaoke out of use, Inoue turned his company towards working with Daiichi Kosho Company, then the top karaoke company, but though he was earning considerable money as chairman of the company left it when he suffered a period of depression. Subsequently, Inoue launched the All-Japan Karaoke Industrialist Association.

== Tributes and awards ==
In 1996, Inoue's connection to karaoke was first publicized by a TV channel in Singapore. In 1999, Time magazine recognized Inoue's role in the newly international craze, describing him as among "The Most Influential Asians of the Century". "[A]s much as Mao Zedong or Mohandis Gandhi changed Asian days," Time author Pico Iyer wrote, "Inoue transformed its nights." Following the exposure by Time, Inoue attracted the attention of international media.

In 2004, Inoue went to Harvard University to accept an Ig Nobel Peace Prize for "inventing karaoke, thereby providing an entirely new way for people to learn to tolerate each other." His rendition there of "I'd Like to Teach the World to Sing" earned a standing ovation. Master of ceremonies Marc Abrahams indicated it was the longest standing ovation the Ig Nobels had ever seen; the audience of largely Nobel Prize laureates responded by serenading Inoue with a chorus of "Can't Take My Eyes off You".

In 2005, director Hiroyuki Tsuji released a fictionalized biographic film of Inoue called Karaoke.

== See also ==
- List of Ig Nobel Prize winners
- List of Japanese inventions
