= Fishbowl (conversation) =

Form of dialogue that can be used when discussing topics within large groups

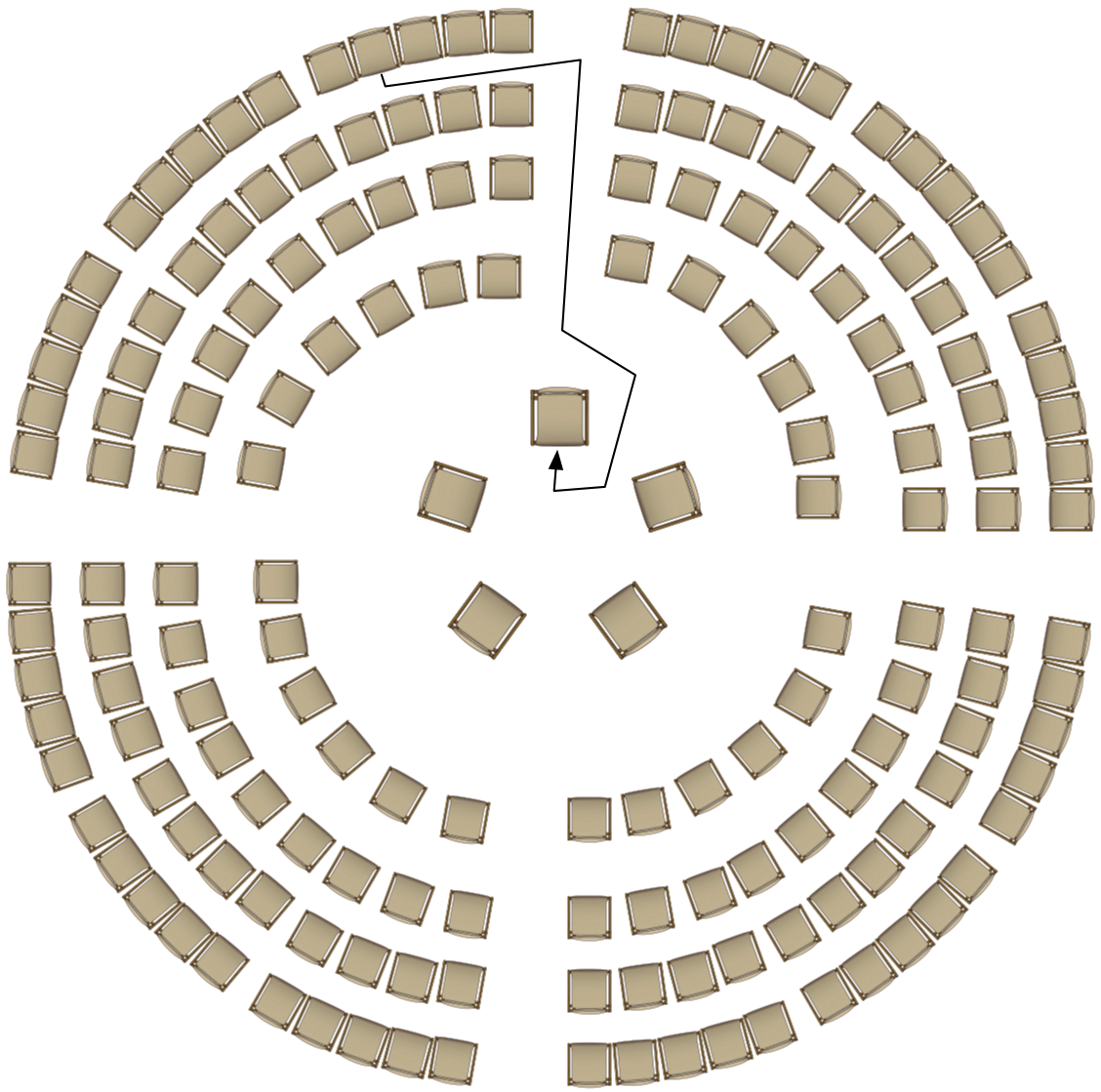
The arrangement of chairs in a fish bowl session. Four concentric rings of chairs surround a smaller group of five chairs. An arrow indicates how any member of the audience may enter the middle section.

A fishbowl conversation is a form of dialogue that can be used when discussing topics within large groups. Fishbowl conversations are sometimes also used in participatory events such as unconferences. The advantage of fishbowl is that it allows the entire group to participate in a conversation. Several people can join the discussion.

== Method ==
A number of chairs (traditionally five) are arranged in an inner circle. This is the fishbowl. The remaining chairs are arranged in concentric circles outside the fishbowl. A few participants are selected to fill the fishbowl, while the rest of the group sit on the chairs outside the fishbowl. In an open fishbowl, one chair is left empty. In a closed fishbowl, all chairs are filled. The moderator introduces the topic and the participants start discussing the topic. The audience outside the fishbowl listen in on the discussion.

In an open fishbowl, any member of the audience can, at any time, occupy the empty chair and join the fishbowl. When this happens, an existing member of the fishbowl must voluntarily leave the fishbowl and free a chair. The discussion continues with participants frequently entering and leaving the fishbowl. Depending on how large the audience is, many audience members can spend some time in the fishbowl and take part in the discussion. When time runs out, the fishbowl is closed and the moderator summarizes the discussion.

An immediate variation of this is to have only two chairs in the central group. When someone in the audience wants to join the two-way conversation, they come forward and tap the shoulder of the person they want to replace, at some point when they are not talking (tapping may be replaced by some other method that achieves the same end, e.g. standing facing the person to replace). The tapped speaker must then return to the outer circles, being replaced by the new speaker, who carries on the conversation in their place.

In a closed fishbowl, the initial participants speak for some time. When time runs out, they leave the fishbowl and a new group from the audience enters the fishbowl. This continues until many audience members have spent some time in the fishbowl. Once the final group has concluded, the moderator closes the fishbowl and summarizes the discussion.

== Advantages ==
An advantage of a fishbowl conversation is that it is suitable for large groups. It also lessens distinctions between the speakers and the audience. Open fishbowls are often seen as highly democratic, as participation in discussion is open to all members at any time. This has made fishbowls popular in participatory group meetings and conferences.

== Issues ==
This is not a forum where introverted or shy people will be inclined to contribute. To include them, it is possible to break the dialogue down into much smaller groups to make them feel comfortable to discuss a topic. Their opinions can be garnered upfront through a post-it gathering exercise or with live-voting on whose opinion they value/want replaced (via non-technical show of arms/clapping or a digital live-voting app).

== Variations ==
The group can be split into two smaller and distinct sub-groups (such as men and women, or older and younger participants), who convene separately and come up with three to four questions for the other group, which are written on cards. The participants reconvene, exchange cards, and form two circles with one subgroup inside the other and both of them facing inwards. The inside group read a question and discuss it, while those in the outside circle listen but do not speak. Each question is discussed in this way, making sure everyone in the inner circle has a chance to speak. The circles are then reversed. The questions that the groups generate can be on the same subject or not, at the discretion of the organizer. This version is a good party game for groups of thirty to sixty people.

Another derivative is to have the fishbowl run for a certain period of time, such as half an hour. The moderator stops the discussion in the fishbowl circle and invites those not in the inner circle to offer their thoughts and comments on what they are hearing in the inner circle.

Another variation is to use technology, such as CoverItLive, to increase participation. This allows all the participants in the outer circle the opportunity to share their thinking in the public online forum without needing to wait turns. The online forum is also projected in the room for the inner circle to use as additional talking points or building ideas from. This variation allows for an environment that supports extroverts and introverts (extroverts speaking in front of the group, introverts sharing their thinking in the online public forum). In this variation, a hot seat (or open seat) is also available for outer circle participants so they can at any time join the fishbowl (inner circle) and share their thinking verbally if needed.

Fishbowls are commonly used as a teaching method in late-primary and secondary schools as an alternative to traditional large-group discussion. In these cases, educators typically use a closed fishbowl format, and the central circle is usually widened to allow all students to participate in the span of a single class period.

== See also ==
- Art of Hosting
- Bohm Dialogue
- Dialogue
- Dialogue mapping
- Learning circle
- Open Space Technology
- Participation (decision making)
- Public consultation
- Speed geeking
- World café (conversation)
