= PowerPoint karaoke =

Game where one improvises presenting PowerPoint slides

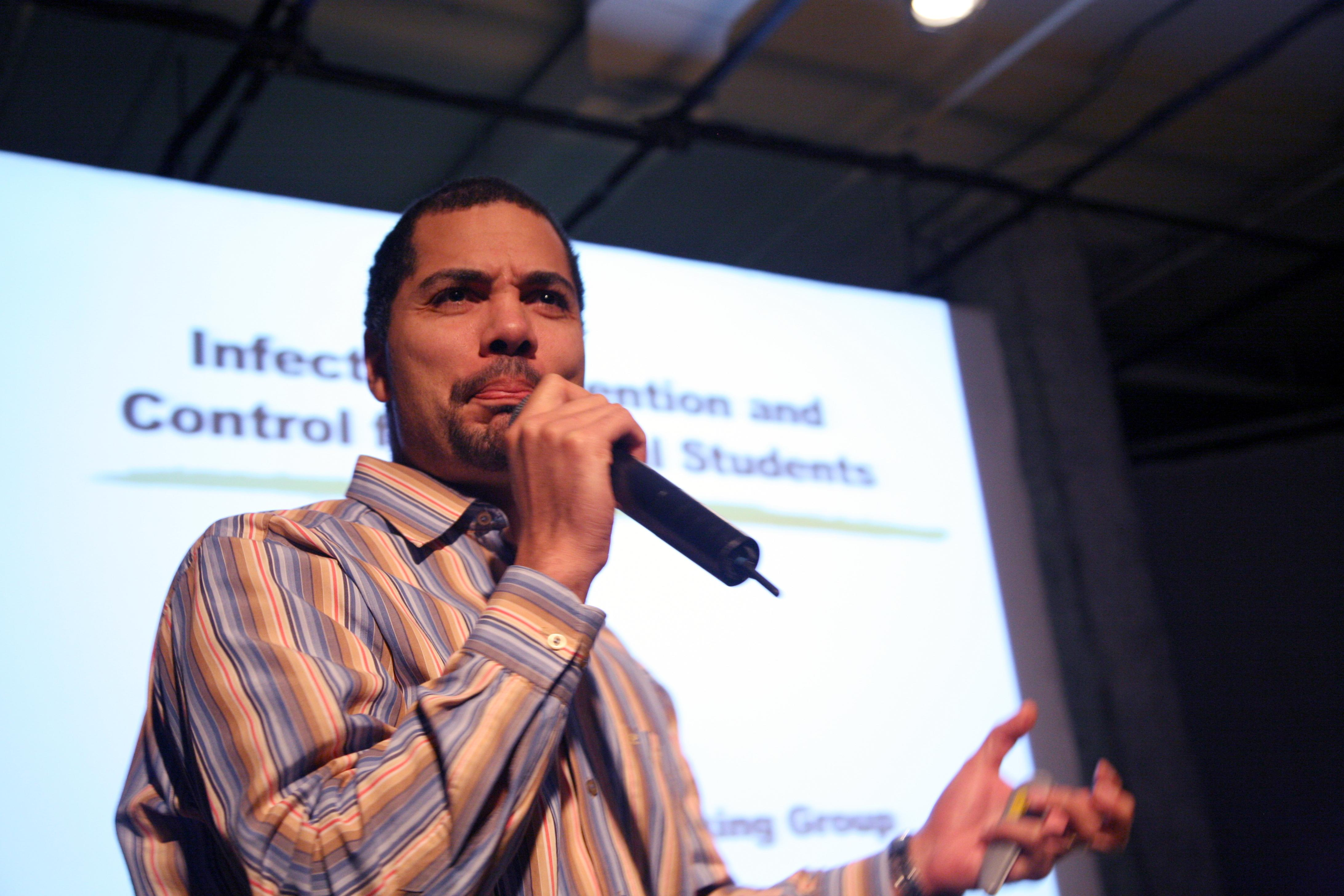
BarCamp, Montreal PowerPoint Karaoke event

PowerPoint karaoke, also known as PPT-oke, battledecks or battle decks, is an improvisational activity in which a participant must deliver a presentation based on a set of slides that they have never seen before. Its name is derived from Microsoft PowerPoint, a popular presentation software, and karaoke, an activity in which a performer sings along with a pre-recorded backing track (although there is usually no music or singing involved in PowerPoint karaoke). The effect is intended to be comical, and PowerPoint karaoke can be considered a form of improvisational theatre, or a type of Theatresports game.

The presentation can either be a real slideshow on an arcane topic, or a set of real slides from different presentations that are nonsensical when assembled together, or slides that are nonsensical on their own (in some cases created by randomly downloading images from the internet and adding unrelated text). In some cases, the presenter is given a theme beforehand that they must attempt to tie all the slides into.

== History ==
PowerPoint karaoke originated in October 2005 in Karlsruhe where engineering students would download a random slide deck and present it during a party. It then spread to students of the Zentrale Intelligenz Agentur, a collective of writers and artists in Berlin. A variation of this game called That Talk's Today?! was invented by an improv troupe known as Senseless Death in 1995, where a performer was asked to leave the room, while an MC and the audience quickly constructed slides, including graphs and acronyms. The performer was then given a topic on which to speak, using the never-seen slides.

== Other uses ==
The term "PowerPoint karaoke" is also sometimes derisively used to refer to presenters who face the screen where their PowerPoint slides are being projected and proceed to read them, boring and effectively ignoring their audience.

Spanish conceptual artist Rubén Grilo used "PowerPoint Karaoke" as a title for a show at MARCO in June 2011.

British philanthropist and raconteur Senor Cucumber used Power Point Karaoke as a tool to convey his economic principles during The Impossible Lecture in Skipton, England in July 2012.

The video game Talking Points in The Jackbox Party Pack 7 is based on PowerPoint karaoke. One player presents a slideshow presentation created in real time by a second "assistant" player, using a user-generated title and provided transition phrases and pictures.

A form of PowerPoint karaoke is frequently played in teams of two on Impractical Jokers. The Jokers have to deliver often nonsensical PowerPoints to rooms full of professionals, whilst attempting to maintain both a sense of order as well as composure.

In 2023, the first World Championship of PowerPoint Karaoke took place at Boom Chicago in Amsterdam. Dutch comedian and improv artist Andries Tunru won the first title. Wildcard contestant Franklin Maduro took the title in 2024. In 2025, Minna Taylor and Nathan de Groot will host Slide Slam: The World Championship of PowerPoint Karaoke in Amsterdam on April 7.

== See also ==
- PechaKucha
- Trachtenburg Family Slideshow Players
