= BarCamp =

International network of user-generated conferences

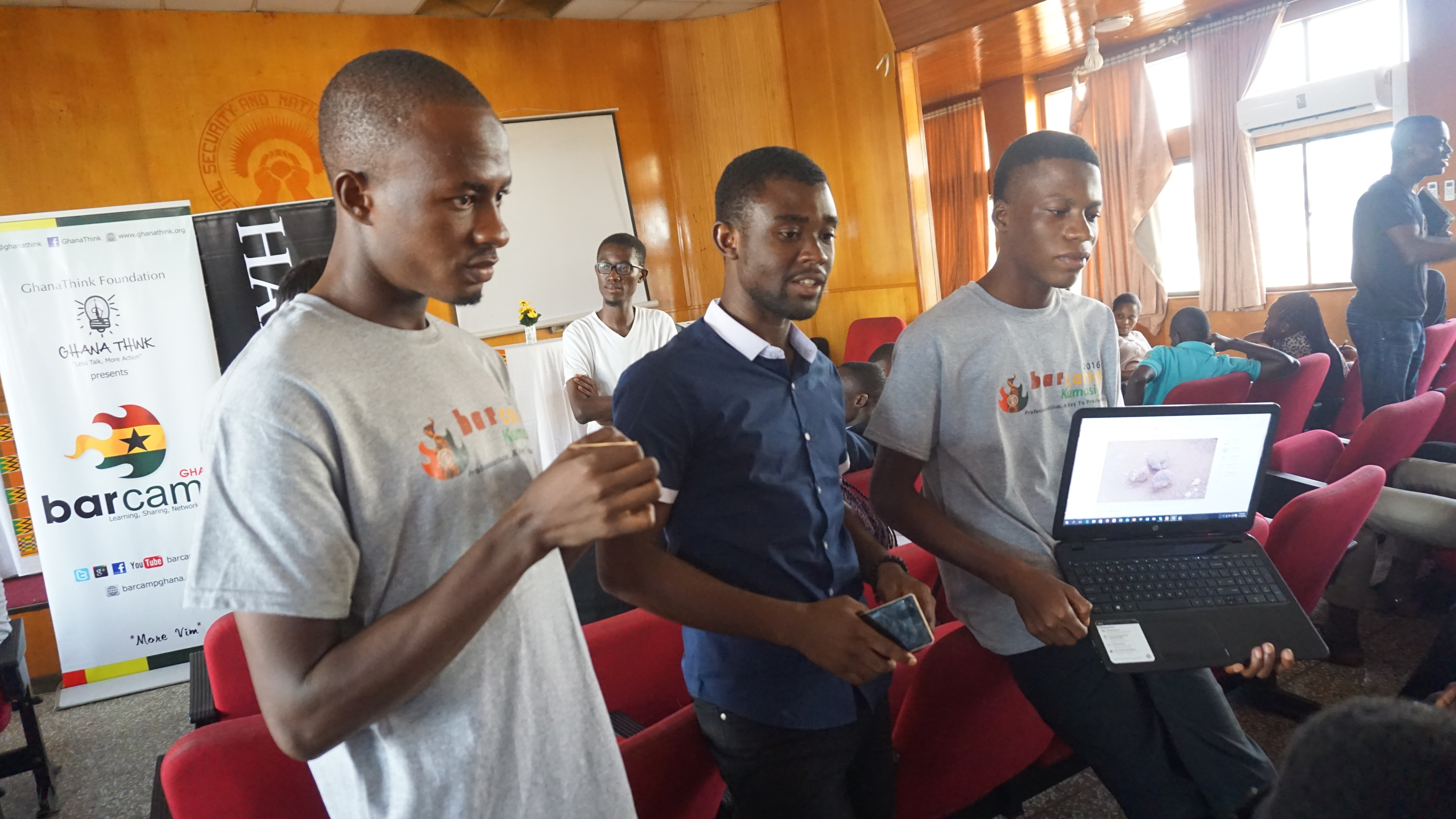
BarCamp held in Kumasi, Ghana (November 12, 2016)

BarCamp is an international network of user-generated conferences primarily focused on technology and the web. They are open, participatory workshop-events, the content of which is provided by participants, sometimes called unconferences. The first BarCamps focused on early stage web applications, and were related to open-source technologies, social software, and open data formats.

The format has also been used for a variety of other topics, including public transit, health care, education, and political organizing. The BarCamp format has also been adapted for specific industries like banking, education, real estate, mortgage, and social media.

== History ==
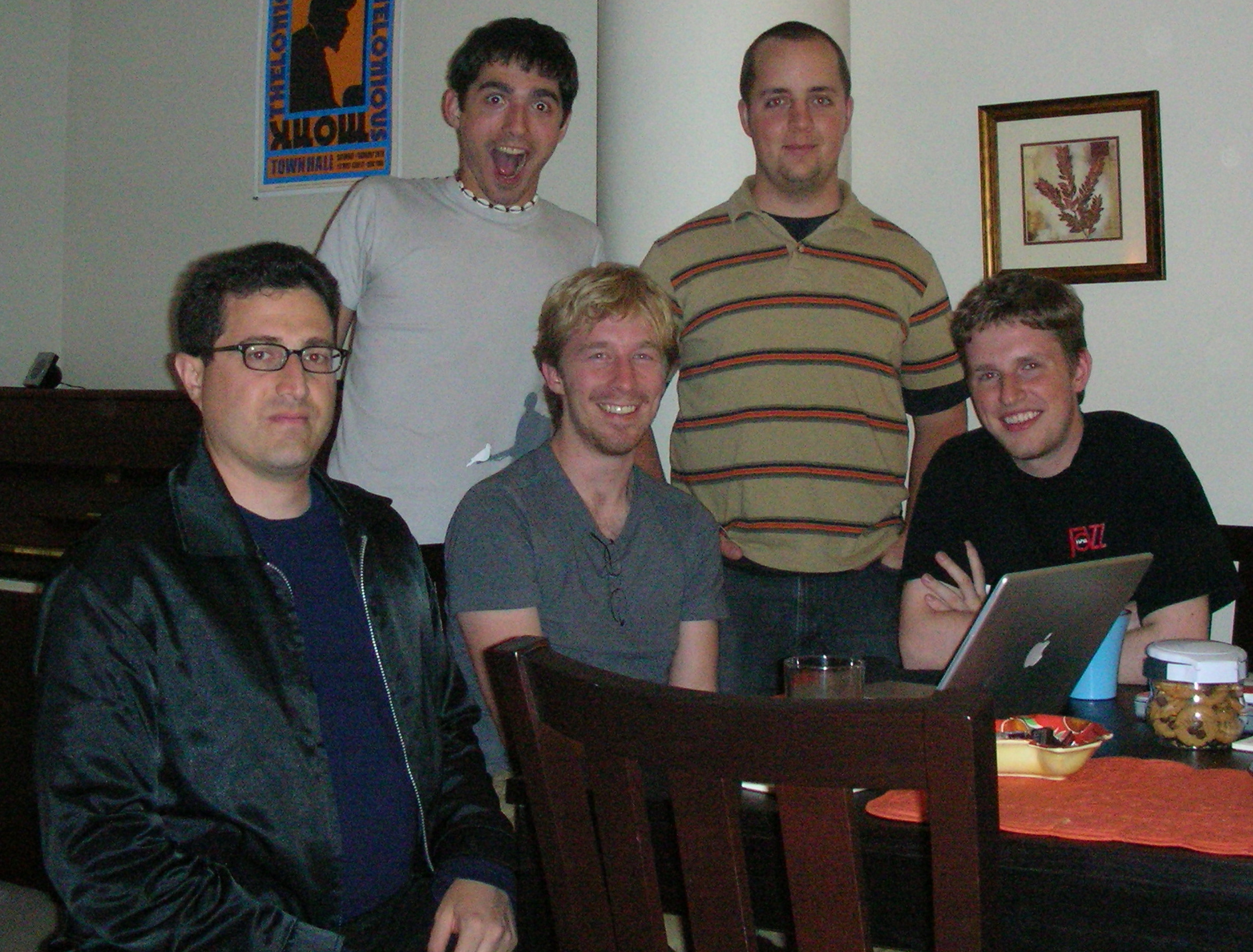
Planning meeting for first BarCamp: Tantek Çelik, Chris Messina, Matt Mullenweg, Andy Smith, and Ryan King (August 20, 2005)

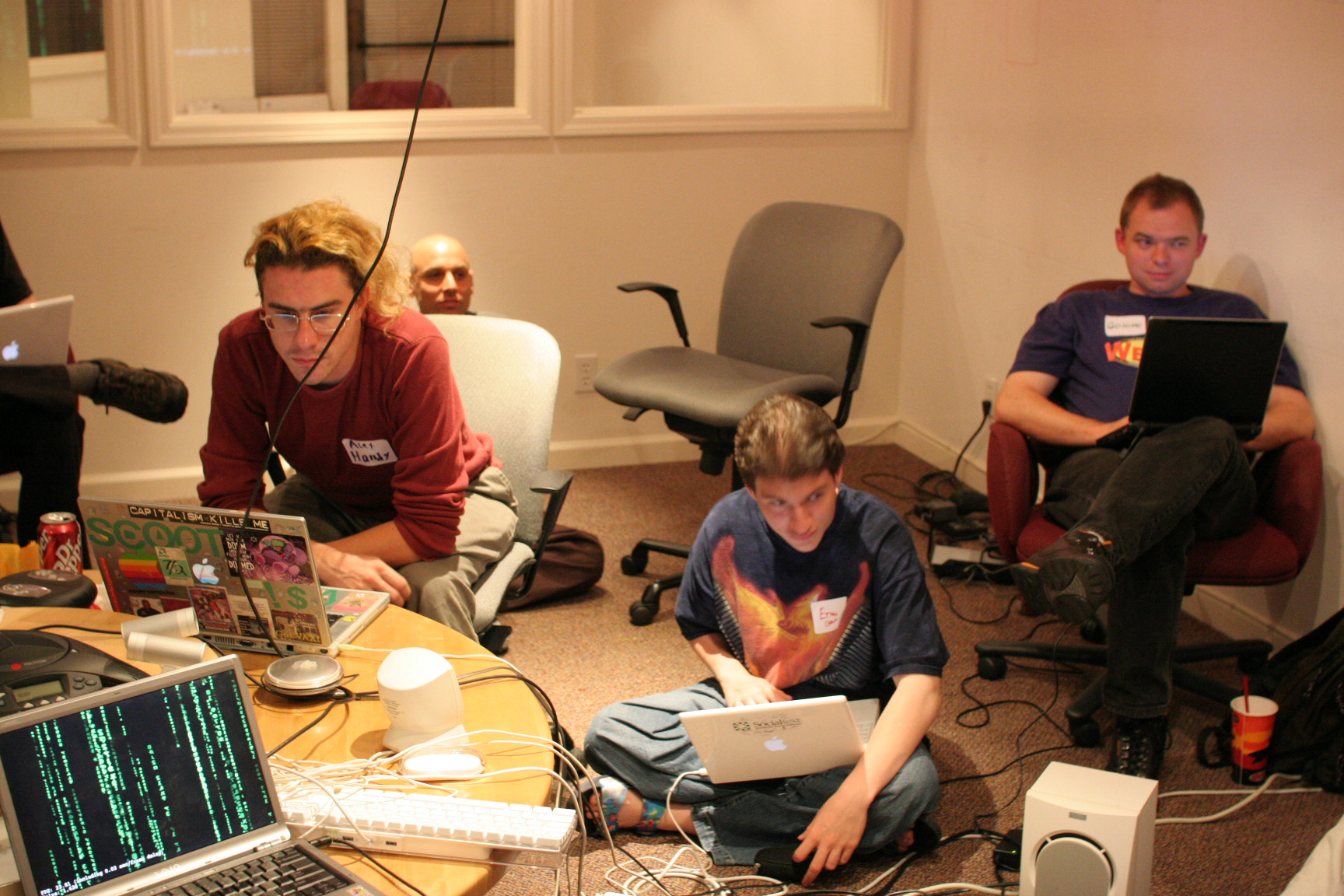
Participants in the first BarCamp simultaneously comment, listen, and follow along on their screens. (August 21, 2005)

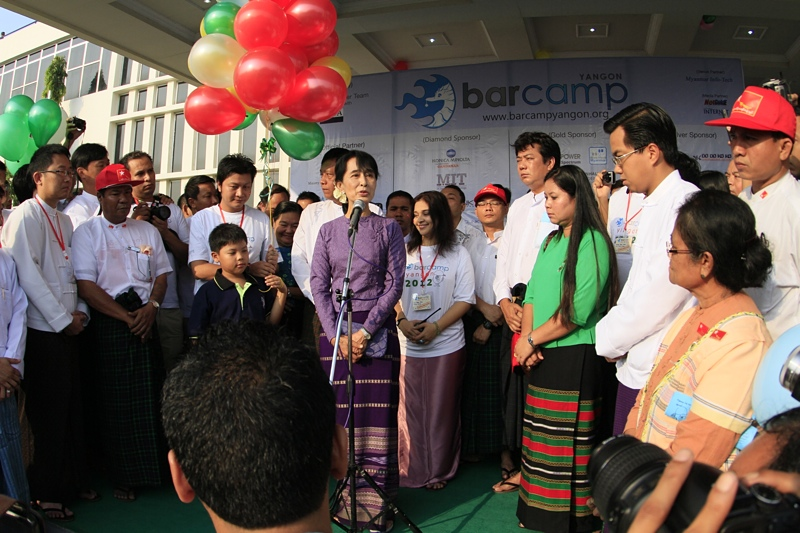
Aung San Suu Kyi gives speech during BarCamp Yangon 2012

The name BarCamp is a playful allusion to the event's origins, with reference to the programmer slang term, foobar: BarCamp arose as an open-to-the-public alternative to Foo Camp, which is an annual invitation-only participant-driven conference hosted by Tim O'Reilly.

The first BarCamp was held in Palo Alto, California, from August 19–21, 2005, in the offices of Socialtext. According to participant Tantek Celik, it was organized in less than one week, from concept to event. In addition to Celik, Chris Messina, Matthew Mullenweg, Andy Smith, Ryan King, and Eris Stassi have been described as founders of BarCamp.

Since then, BarCamps have been held in over 350 cities around the world, in North America, South America, Africa, Europe, the Middle East, Australasia and Asia. Attendees have often travelled internationally to attend BarCamps.

To mark the first anniversary of BarCamp, BarCampEarth was held in multiple locations worldwide on August 25–27, 2006. Wired described the second anniversary meeting BarCampBlock (Palo Alto, August 18–19, 2007) as "BarCamp Geeks Celebrate Two Years of Organized Chaos."

In January 2013, the largest recorded BarCamp took place in Yangon, Myanmar (Burma), with 6,400 attendees and free internet provided by the government.

== Structure and participatory process ==
Unlike traditional conference formats, both BarCamps and FooCamps have a self-organizing character. The organizers of a BarCamp may choose the theme for the meeting, but those who choose to attend are in charge of the schedule. Attendees schedule sessions by writing on a whiteboard or putting a Post-It note on a 'grid' of sessions. Those giving sessions are discouraged from using the sessions for promotion. BarCamps are often organized largely through the web; anyone can initiate a BarCamp using the BarCamp wiki.

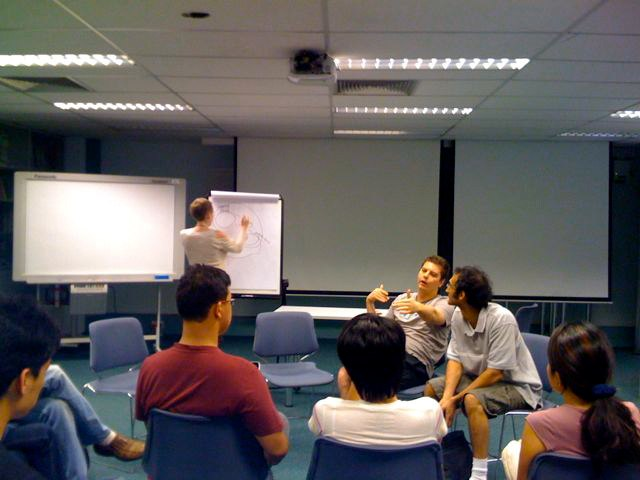
Students taking part in a BarCamp at Ngee Ann Polytechnic, Singapore, in February 2009

Although the format is loosely structured, there are rules at BarCamp. All attendees are encouraged to present or facilitate a session or otherwise contribute to the event. Everyone is also asked to share information and experiences of the event via public web channels, including blogs, photo sharing, social bookmarking, Twitter, wikis, and IRC. This encouragement to share is a deliberate change from the "off-the-record by default" and "no recordings" rules at many invite-only participant driven conferences. It also turns a physical, face-to-face event into a 'hybrid event' which enables remote online engagement with BarCamp participants.

== Hosting and attending ==
Venues typically provide basic services. Free network access, usually WiFi, is crucial. Following the model of Foo Camp, the venue also makes space for the attendees, or BarCampers, to literally camp out overnight. Thus, BarCamps rely on securing sponsorship, ranging from the venue and network access to beverages and food.

Attendance is typically free of charge and generally restricted only by space constraints. Participants are typically encouraged to sign up in advance.

== Historical precedents ==
Historically, BarCamp was based on the structure of Foo Camp, but with the requirement that participation should be open to all. (Foo Camp, an early unconference, was organized by Tim O'Reilly and Sara Winge; Winge had been a student of Harrison Owen.

This form of self-organized user generated conferences is also related to hackers' meetings in Europe, especially those nearer to anarchism and autonomism, happening since the '90s in Temporary Autonomous Zones or other occupied places. However, BarCamps lack the political motivations and are actually quite integrated with the mainstream ICT industry, often getting substantial sponsorships from major corporations.

== See also ==
- Café Philosophique
- Hackathon
- Knowledge cafe
- StixCamp
- SuperHappyDevHouse
- Sweden Social Web Camp
- TeachMeet
- Tribe (internet)
- DataMeet
- Unconference
