= BarCampBank =

BarCampBank is an ongoing series of unconferences about innovation in the financial world. This subset of the software-oriented BarCamp grew out of BarCampParis4, on September 16, 2006, in Paris at Mandriva. The first BarCampBank in North America was held at the office of Evri in Seattle in July 2007 and was spearheaded by Jesse Robbins at the request of Frederic Baud, who was instrumental in the creation of the first BarCampBank in Paris.

The second BarCampBank held in the U.S. was BarCampBankSF on March 29, 2008 in Berkeley, CA at UC Berkeley's Soda Hall, followed on subsequent weekends by BarCampBank New England at America's Credit Union Museum in Manchester, NH, and BarCampMoney NYC in Manhattan.
