= Beyond Us & Them =

Los Angeles-based nonprofitable organization

- Founded: 2014; 12 years ago (as Center for Council)
- Founder: Jared Seide
- Purpose: Programs and trainings within the social justice, educational, law enforcement and health care systems
- Location: Los Angeles, California, United States
- Method: Community service
- Website: beyondusandthem.org

Beyond Us & Them (formerly Center for Council) is a Los Angeles–based nonprofit organization that trains practitioners in using council to promote wellness and resiliency and utilizes the practice of council to enhance social connection, well being, and restorative justice as well as foster resilient and thriving communities. Beyond Us & Them offers programs and trainings within the social justice, educational, law enforcement and health care systems, and in partnership with businesses and community-based organizations. The organization aims to use mindfulness practices, compassion-based communication exercises, and training in self-awareness, resilience, and self-regulation to help heal divisions between disparate communities.

== Overview ==
Council is a codified practice, derived from ancient traditions, that involves bringing individuals together in a council circle, under the guidance of a trained facilitator, for a candid and heartfelt conversation. Within the circle, the opportunity to talk is offered one at a time, with the intent to speak from one's personal experience rather than opinion. Participants are encouraged to speak authentically when it's their turn and to listen deeply, without comment or judgment, while others are speaking. The intention is focused on the common stories, values, fears, and aspirations that make one human, encouraging taking the perspective of the other and finding common ground. Council is a compassion-based attentional practice that fosters greater awareness of self and others and capacity for cultivating skillful communication, respectful relationships and ethical action.

Beyond Us & Them founder and executive director, Jared Seide described Council practice as follows:

We practice listening intentionally, without the need to analyze what's being said, and we speak spontaneously and without an agenda. We're able to create an environment where we can just be human together, and that's enormously sustaining, because in the circle there are likely others who've been where you are and who have resources you didn't realize were available. ... Council is for all of us who are slowly losing touch with the ability to be present with each other.

Seide received the 2023 Marcia Slater Johnston Award for Outstanding Leadership in Community-Based Efforts to Reduce Social Isolation and Loneliness conferred by the Foundation for Social Connection for "exemplifying exceptional leadership and dedication in reducing social isolation and loneliness and promoting connection in his community.

== History ==
Beyond Us & Them is the successor organization of Center for Council, which began as a program of The Ojai Foundation in 1984. In 2014, Center For Council restructured to become its own independent organization, relaunching as Beyond Us & Them, a 501(c)(3) nonprofit, in 2024. The organization is an outgrowth of the practices and ideals codified in Jack Zimmerman and Virginia "Gigi" Coyle's book The Way of Council, and later in Jared Seide's 2021 book, Where Compassion Begins: Foundational Practices to Enhance Mindfulness, Attention and Listening from the Heart.

== Programs ==
Beyond Us & Them offers programs and trainings within the social justice, educational, law enforcement and health care systems, and in partnership with businesses and community-based organizations. Its programs are intended to support mindfulness, social and emotional learning and creative problem-solving and the development of skillful communication, cooperation, leadership and compassion. Programs are structured in a "train-the-trainer" format, where participants learn skills to facilitate circles for their peers and community. Programming is built on the premise that sharing stories in a respectful and intentional way leads to healing and community well-being.

=== Council for Insight, Compassion and Resilience ===
Beyond Us & Them's "Council for Insight, Compassion and Resilience" (formerly the "Inmate Council Program") is a six-month intervention where prisoners are trained to facilitate council sessions for other prisoners. This program has been expanded to 29 California prisons. The Council for Insight, Compassion and Resilience was awarded the 2020 "Innovations in Corrections Prize" by the American Correctional Association. Through the Council for Insight, Compassion and Resilience, participants learn and teach council-based convening and communication skills to support healthy and productive perspectives and behaviors. The program has been found by corrections staff to help shift culture within the prison and provide inmates with tools for success upon their release.

Participation in rehabilitative programs like Council for Insight, Compassion and Resilience has been found by the California Department of Corrections and Rehabilitation to reduce the rate of reoffending to 25% or less for individuals who participate.

=== Training For Law Enforcement ===
Following the expansion of Beyond Us & Them's work with prison inmates, the California Office of the Inspector General released a special report on High Desert State Prison in December 2015 that recommended implementing a council-based "Wellness and Resiliency Skills Training" program for law enforcement and correctional officers as an antidote to the "entrenched culture" of racism and violence there. The organization created "POWER Training" (Peace Officer Wellness, Empathy & Resilience Training), a mindfulness-oriented training program for law enforcement officers piloted for the Los Angeles Police Department (LAPD) and subsequently expanded to other law enforcement agencies around the country, including the Jacksonville Sheriff’s Office (JSO). The POWER Training program is certified by the Commission on Peace Officer Standards and Training (C-POST) and the International Association of Directors of Law Enforcement Standards and Training (IADLEST) and focuses on building skills for improving wellness, interpersonal communication and de-escalation. Graduates of the first cohort of the POWER Training program were featured in a documentary, "Cops & Communities: Circling Up", which also highlighted the work the organization has brought to community activists and formerly incarcerated participants.

In 2022, the US Department of Justice’s Office of Community Oriented Policing Services (COPS Office) entered into a partnership with Beyond Us & Them focusing on the POWER program "to increase law enforcement awareness of the intersectionality of wellness, procedural justice, and community building." In 2024, Congressionally directed spending championed by Senator Bernie Sanders funded Beyond Us & Them to bring its POWER program to all law enforcement officers in the state of Vermont, as well as launching its programs in prisons throughout the state.

Peer-reviewed research published in the Journal of Community Safety and Well-Being examined participant heart rate variability and found that the POWER program improved overall autonomic health in participating officers, correlating with anecdotal reports of better sleep, a reduction in headaches and decreases in blood pressure.

=== Research & Additional Programs ===
Beyond Us & Them's "Organizational Wellness Project" (formerly the Social Justice Council Project) provides staff at social justice and social service organizations with training to more effectively engage with constituents and provide services, while also helping foster more cooperative and supportive work environments. Current and past participants include: Homeboy Industries, Anti-Recidivism Coalition, The Actors' Gang, TreePeople, Heart of LA, Brotherhood Crusade, Para Los Niños and many other community based organizations. Additional programs include the "School Community Enhancement Project", the "Trainer Leadership Initiative", and "Compassion, Attunement & Resilience Education (CARE) for Healthcare Professionals".

Research conducted by University of California and RAND Corporation found that Beyond Us & Them's programs result in "significant positive outcomes" involving reductions in aggression, anger and hostility, as well as increases in empathy and resilience.

Researchers studying participants in the “Council for Insight, Compassion & Resilience” program for incarcerated individuals found significant positive changes in socio-cognitive functioning. This included pronounced reductions in physical and verbal aggression and marked increases in social connectedness, mindfulness, and resilience. Beyond social connection, findings across council programs reflect immediate and long-term emotional, psychological, and physical improvements in overall health. This is marked by better sleep, medication reduction, weight loss, lower blood pressure, reduced inflammation, and heart rate variability.

In response to the COVID-19 pandemic, Beyond Us & Them began offering online programming, including "Social Connection Councils", for the public, as well as "Essential Worker Councils" and an online learning course called "The Bridge".
