= Hybrid event =

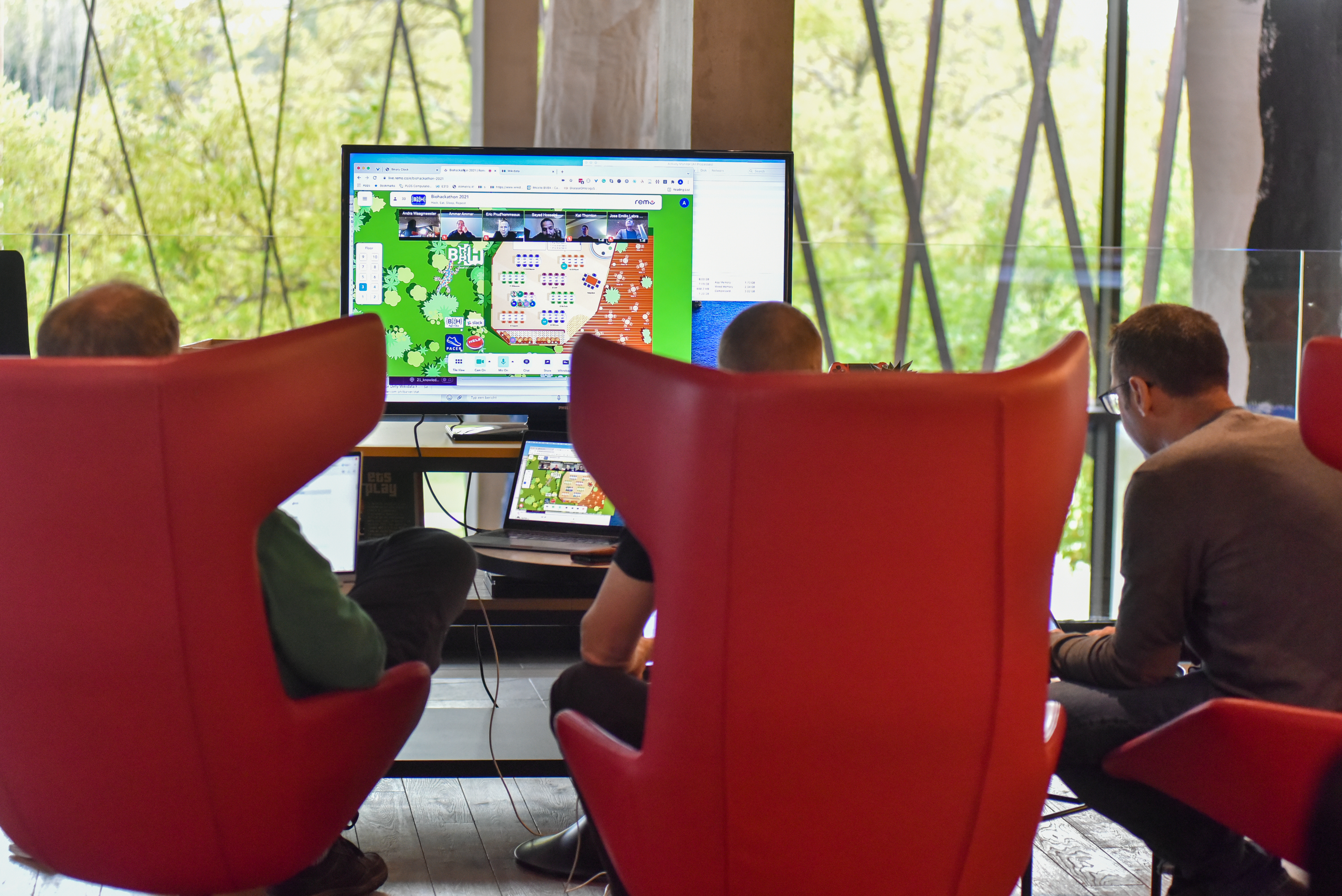
Participants of a hackathon interact with remote participants.

A hybrid event is a tradeshow, conference, unconference, seminar, workshop or other meeting that combines a "live" in-person event with a "virtual" online component.

As virtual events have expanded, hybrid formats are used to increase participation in traditional events. They allow participation by those constrained by travel, time zones, or environmental considerations. Unconferences, such as Barcamp, incorporate these components through their emphasis on content sharing.

Generally, the virtual component involves an online representation of the live event. For example, online participants might have access to:

- live audio or video streaming of keynote speakers or workshops alongside their presentation material
- online presentations (ranging from webcasts to sharing of content via online slide sharing websites)
- hybrid event webcast with synchronized slides alongside the live and archived webcast video presentation
- creation of a live commentary or transcript of proceedings
- online chat or discussion forum facilities, including audience polls or question submission
- live blogs
- event photographs and video
- integration of other social media tools

Hybrid events typically provide internet access, frequently via free Wi-Fi. As well as allowing a physical event to reach a wider audience, these online tools also provide a means for physical attendees to interact with each other, with the event organisers and with online participants, and for online participants to interact with each other. Some events have featured 'TwitterWalls' where Twitter comments about the event are shared with physical attendees.

Event content can also be recorded and made available online to foster further discussions after the event has ended, build out a knowledge portal for event participants, and help market the next year's event by sharing highlights from the current year.

== Examples of hybrid events ==
- One of the first university-level hybrid events was held in 1992, between the University of Helsinki in Finland and Williams College in the US, directed by the philosophers Esa Saarinen and Mark C. Taylor, though then defined as the first global seminar using teleconferencing technology. The book, Imagologies: Media Philosophy (1994) grew out of the seminar.
- Barcamp events encourage participants to share information via public web channels such as blogs, photo sharing, social bookmarking, Twitter, wikis, and IRC, departing from standard conference restrictions on recording.
- BASF has complemented a global employee summit with a virtual component. The physical event brought together IT professionals from all over the world to the BASF headquarters. Shortly after the event keynotes, workshop results, street interviews, and other materials were available for virtual participants. The virtual components remained accessible for several months to accommodate remote participants.
- Cisco Live on-site conferences run concurrently with a virtual component, called Cisco Live and Networkers Virtual. Cisco Live was awarded Best Hybrid Live+Virtual Program at the 2010 Ex Awards. In addition, it was awarded the 2010 Grand Ex Award.
- Centers for Disease Control and Prevention (CDC) held the government's first hybrid event on August 21–24, 2011, with the introduction of an immersive virtual version of the Public Health Informatics conference, (an in-person event held at the Hyatt Regency Atlanta hotel). Remote partners and public health IT personnel accessed the plenary and concurrent sessions simultaneously with the in-person event. Co-sponsored by the National Association of County and City Health Officials (NACCHO), the hybrid option was provided to lower travel expenses and environmental impacts.The event recorded 1,865 online registrations alongside the traditional conference average of approximately 1,500.
