= Easiteach =

Software for interactive whiteboards

Easiteach is a suite of software programs mainly used in conjunction with interactive whiteboards in schools. The software is made by Research Machines Ltd, who provide ICT software and services to schools worldwide. An advantage of Easiteach is that it works with most popular brands of whiteboard, whereas many other popular packages work only with the whiteboard they are designed for.

Easiteach and related products, which include interactive whiteboards and such peripherals as a dance mat are seen as pivotal to RM, with the Investors' Chronicle commenting that its "near-term growth prospects hinge upon Easiteach, the interactive whiteboards, now installed in over 8,000 UK schools". Easiteach is also widely used outside the UK, with a 2006 estimate of 40,000 installations worldwide.

RM won four awards at the British Education and Training and Technology 2005 show, including two for Easyteach Literacy and Easyteach Maths.
