= World café (conversation) =

Conversational process

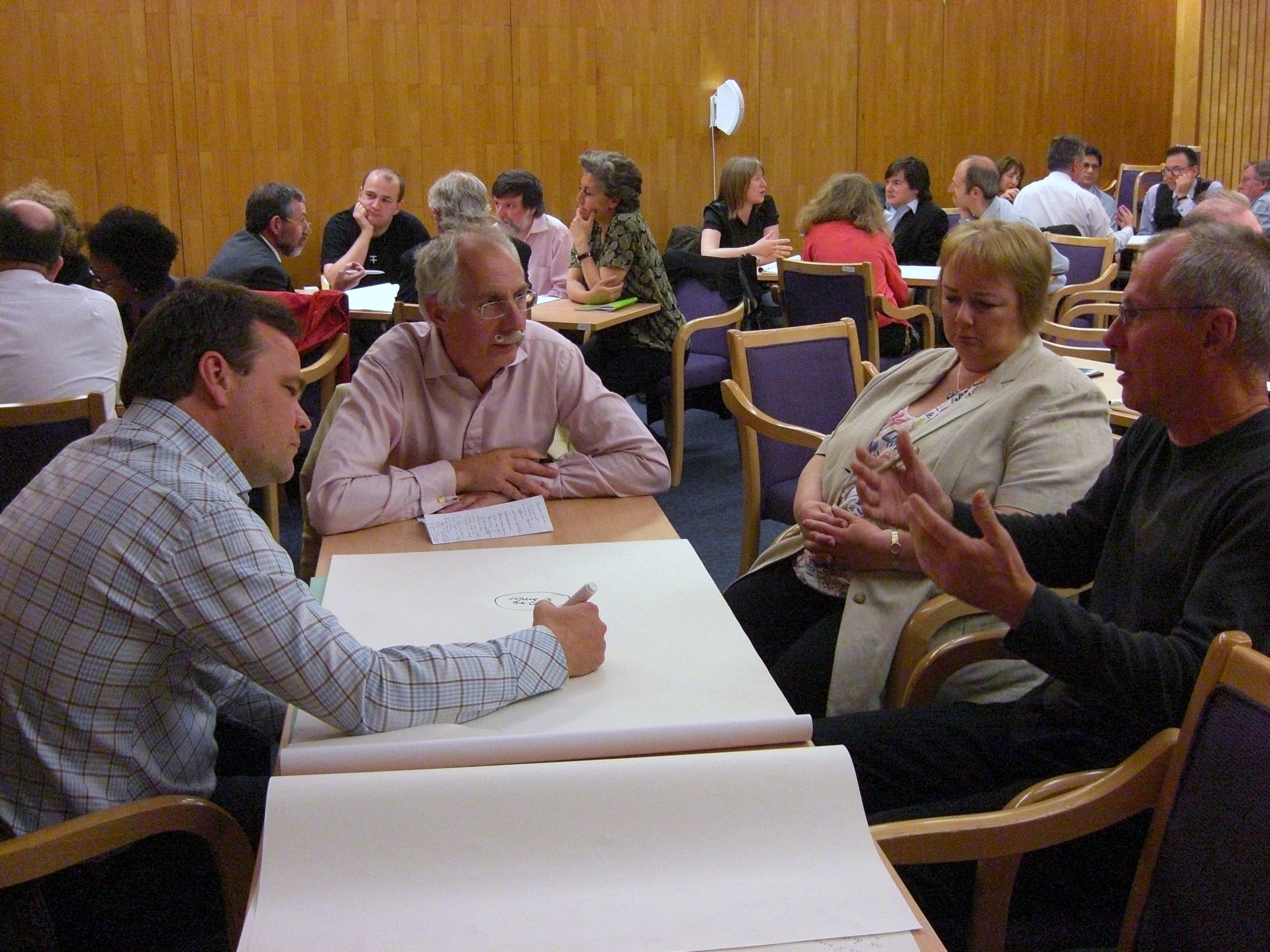
Small group conversation at a Gurteen Knowledge Café

A world café is a structured conversational process for knowledge sharing where a large group of participants participate in smaller discussions groups organized around several small tables like those in a café. The process is usually organized in rounds: a few participants discuss one topic at each table for a fixed amount of time, then circulate to another table for a new discussion in the next round, and so forth. Either at the end of the process or at the end of each round, an individual from each group is invited to share insights from the discussion.

Some degree of formality may be retained to make sure that everyone gets a chance to speak. Although pre-defined questions have been agreed upon at the beginning, outcomes or solutions are not decided in advance. One participant may remain at each table throughout the process to serve as a "table host" to record comments, quickly summarize past discussions for incoming groups, and/or to share insights with the broader group.

The assumption is that collective discussion can shift people's conceptions and encourage collective action. A smaller event with 3 rounds and 4 participants at each table needs to have at least twelve participants, but there is no upper limit on participation for this method. For example, one of the largest documented World Café events occurred in 2007 during the World Café Community gathering in San Francisco, where over 2000 participants engaged in discussions.

== Knowledge café ==
A knowledge café, as developed by David Gurteen, has small tables, and a single open ended-question for all of the groups to discuss. The aim is to maximise time spent in conversation, so that time spent with any one person presenting is minimised. Discussion at each table is open and there is no formal attempt to capture what is said—the value is in the conversation itself.

== Modified world café ==
Modified world café is a variant developed in 2019 and structured in two rounds which have the same length and an equal number of tables. Each group is provided with a goal to work on and each round is ended by plenary presentation. After the intermediate presentation, all members of each group except one (called the "host") are asked to move their seats to a new table and start a new round of discussion that is concluded by a final plenary presentation.

Application in Japanese clinical clerkship and postgraduate (residency) clinical teaching showed a relevant increase of the perceived usefulness and consent in respect of the product of the discussion groups.

== See also ==
- Art of Hosting
- Bohm Dialogue
- Dialogue
- Dialogue mapping
- Fishbowl (conversation)
- Learning circle
- Open Space Technology
- Participation (decision making)
- Public consultation
- Speed geeking
- Unconference
