= Art of Hosting =

Leadership methodology

“The Art of Hosting” is a method of participatory leadership for facilitating group processes, as used by a loose-knit community of practitioners. In their method, people are invited into structured conversation about matters they are concerned about while facilitators act as hosts. This community group understands “hosting” as a certain way of facilitation that is supposed to have the capacity of making emerge the collective intelligence that people possess. As an approach to facilitation, The Art of Hosting is focused on “improved, conscious, and kind ways of growing a capacity to support a deliberate wisdom, unique to being together,” and also relies on a specific attitude to process organization. The practitioners see this methodology of engagement as a way to bring people in complex, social systems into convergence on collective actions, with the participants discovering and proposing their own solutions.

== Approach ==
The Art of Hosting is a specific approach and methodology for group facilitation and systems change, developed and curated according to a commons or open-source model by an international community of facilitation practitioners. Starting around the late 1990s, or early 2000s, the community shares methods, tools, and terminology to improve how people can understand and mobilize to respond to complex social, political, and economic change in a participatory manner. It applies dialogic techniques and complex systems analysis (e.g. the Cynefin framework and Chaordic organization), and is partly informed by social theories, including structuration, actor-network theory, and situated knowledges.

People in this community typically use a certain set of theories and metaphors to make group processes understandable, such as Theory U, to draw insight into human interactions. They draw upon a bundle of facilitation methods such as Open Space Technology, World café (conversation) and Circle process/practice. They apply techniques of Appreciative inquiry and Fishbowl in a customized way depending upon the purpose of the engagement.

The approach is rooted in a practice framework that help facilitators attend to "conversations that matter," referred to as The Four-Fold Practice. Furthermore, the framework of Art of Hosting gives attention to posing significant questions for group consideration, and documenting results from the dialogue sessions, termed ‘harvesting.’ As in their experience creating fruitful group processes only comes through practice and refinement, the community terms its overall approach an “art”. In their work, those who initiate group conversation are often termed ‘callers,’ as they call or invite people to engage around a specific shared challenge. One focus is on the practice of constructing and holding dialogic “containers”, meetings or processes bounded in space and time, which support constructive group processes and enable new insights and decisions to emerge. Practitioners claim that well-hosted events and projects increase the adaptive capacity of the group.

These metaphors and methods are developed and applied by a self-organising learning community. There is no central institution deciding what belongs to the canon – it emerges from what the community uses and evolves through a process of informal peer review that focuses upon application. The community's media of exchange and documentation are practice-oriented webpages, and grey literature.

== Examples of application ==
The approach is used in diverse settings, including health care reform, the European Commission, higher education, sustainable development, as well as a methodology for evaluation participatory action research and community-based leadership development. Overall, the approach is intended as a methodology for nurturing innovation and building experiences in democratic decision-making in the context of civic engagement.

== See also ==
- Organization development
- Participative decision-making in organizations
