= Study circle =

Students who meet in small groups

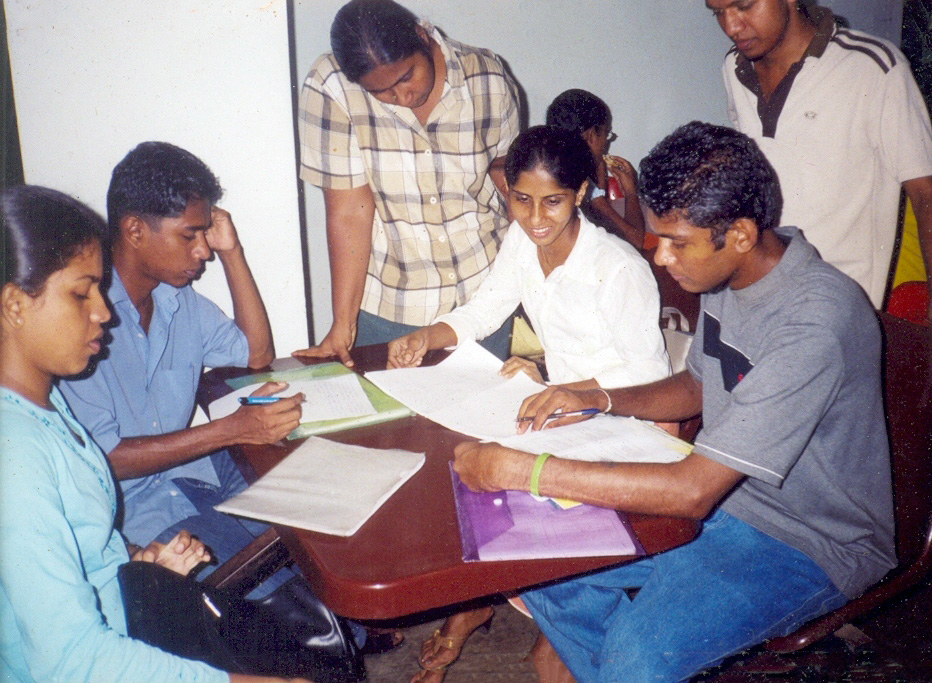

A study circle is a small group of people who meet multiple times to discuss an issue. Study circles may be formed to discuss anything from politics to religion to hobbies, with an ideal group size of between 7 and 15 people. These study circles are formed by a study circle organiser, and are led by a study circle leader. Study circle doesn't have a teacher. They are differentiated from clubs by their focus on exploring an issue or topic rather than on activities or socializing. When they emerged in the early twentieth century they were based on a democratic approach to self-education and were often linked to social movements concerned with temperance or working class emancipation.

== Basics ==
Study circles are typically created by persons who discover a common interest; other study circles may be created to analyze and find solutions to social, political, or community problems.

Often there is no teacher, but one member usually acts as facilitator to keep discussion flowing and on track, and ensure that everyone has an opportunity to become as involved as he or she desires to be. Reading material and audio/visual aids are often used to stimulate dialogue.

Study circles may be introductory level, advanced level, or any level in between. Study circles may be sponsored or assisted by government or community officials and have specific outcome goals such as generating ideas or suggesting courses of action; or they may be entirely independent and self-sufficient, existing simply for the pleasure of increasing the knowledge of their members.

While there is no one right way to do a study circle, organizations such as Everyday Democracy (formerly the Study Circles Resource Center) have published simple and suitable dialogue methods for creating deeper understanding, for weighing options and making choices, or for making recommendations that lead to action.

Study circles allow complex topics to be broken down into manageable parts. Single session programs can result in meaningful and productive dialogue, but study circles usually involve multiple sessions in order to fully investigate the question at hand. However, a study by Staffan Larson in 2001 concluded that while study circles foster participation they are only partly successful as civic change vehicles since their power to influence social action can be weak.

== History and evolution ==
In the early 19th century, Danish Lutheran pastor N. F. S. Grundtvig envisioned folk high schools that rapidly spread through Scandinavia and Central Europe. Forms of informal education such as folk high schools and popular lectures (such as Chautauqua) helped inspire the development of study circles in Sweden in the late 19th and early 20th centuries as a part of the activities in popular movements, such as the temperance and the workers' movements. Oscar Olsson was a prominent Swedish proponent of study circles. Since these movements' participants were working class or small farmers the study circles were important in relation to these classes' growing political power in the early 20th century. The issues that were studied were already from the early period broad—they could be as well political and social issues as literature or even school topics.

In Sweden today study circles are a mass phenomenon and have broad national support. Around 300,000 study circles have been reported each year since the 1970s. National educational associations receive annual subsidies from the national government and work with folk high schools (folkhögskolor), university short courses, correspondence study and distance learning, allowing citizens to understand and participate more fully in their communities and nation. The Swedish study circle model was successfully transplanted into American culture, most notably in the National Issues Forums (sponsored by the Domestic Policy Association in Dayton, Ohio) and the Bricklayers and Allied Craftsmen's Study Circle Program which began in 1986.

Narodnaya Volya ("People's Will"), a Russian revolutionary populist organisation, made extensive use of study circles in the 1870s. The concept was taken up by the Georgian Social Democrat group Mesame Dasi ("Third Group") in the 1890s. A youthful Joseph Stalin was involved in leading some of these.

Study circles have been employed as a change process and development activity within corporations. Some of the same ideas and concepts of community study circles can be applied to internal issues such as diversity and race relations.

Study circles have been used extensively in Australia for some years to engage citizens in issues as diverse as reconciliation between Indigenous and non-Indigenous Australians, and tackling environmental disasters like blue-green algae in the nation's river systems. Around 2010, the Australian Study Circles Network was developed as a central resource for study circle practitioners in Australia.

== See also ==
- Adult education
- Community of inquiry
- Council circle
- Learning circle
- Popular education
