= Computers in Education Society of Ireland =

CESI
- Computers in Education Society of Ireland
- Cumann Ríomh-Oideachais na hÉireann
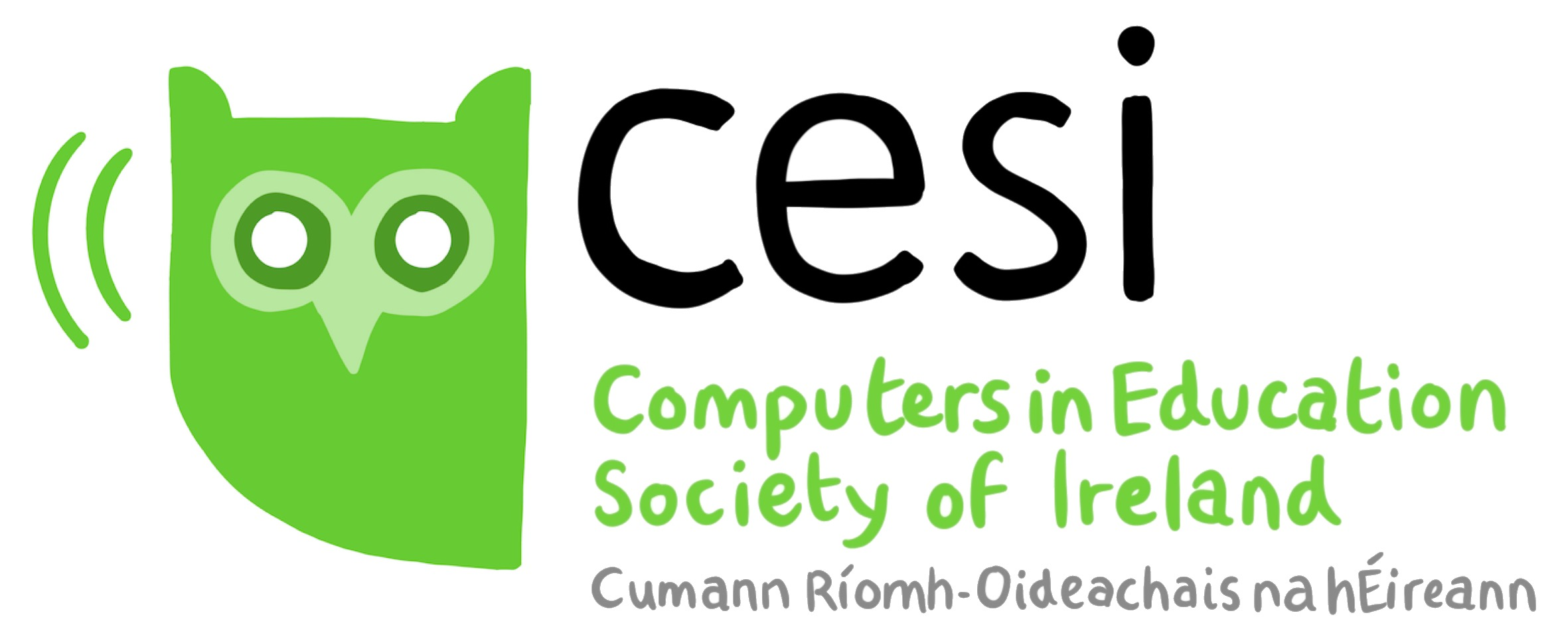
- Owl logo with WiFi signals and full title in English and Gaeilge
- Abbreviation: CESI
- Formation: January 1973; 53 years ago
- Type: Teacher Professional Network
- Purpose: Promoting computer science and information technology in Irish education
- Location: Ireland
- Origins: Friendly Association
- Region served: Ireland
- Services: Professional networks, conferences, resources for educators
- Fields: Education, Technology
- Members: Voluntary
- Official language: English, Gaeilge
- Website: https://www.cesi.ie

The Computers in Education Society of Ireland (CESI), (Irish: Cumann Ríomh-Oideachais na hÉireann) is a teacher professional network founded in 1973 to promote the use of computers and information technology in education. CESI aims to enhance the teaching and learning experience through the integration of computing for teaching and learning. The society strives to foster a community of educators who regularly come together to share insights and resources related to the use of computers or the practice of teaching computing in the classroom.

== Membership ==
CESI is open to anyone interested in the potential of technology to improve educational practices. Its members include educators, technologists, and anyone involved in the educational sector who seeks to leverage technology for better learning outcomes.

== Activities ==
The members have been contributors to various initiatives and have contributed to a variety of courses and curriculum. For example, members of the organisation contributed directly to the content of both the Junior Cycle Short Course on Coding and Leaving Certificate Computer Science

Several times a year, CESI holds informal gatherings in various locations in Ireland. These include TeachMeet and online Open Café webinars, podcasts, and video conversations. Participants discuss innovative practices in education technology in a convivial social learning environment.

The organisation maintains two mailing lists (one specific to Leaving Certificate Computer Science matters) and holds an annual conference, CESIcon.

== History ==
A constitution was drafted and in January 1973 the Computer Education Society of Ireland was established. At the Annual General Meeting in 1974 a motion was passed permitting branches of the society to be formed. In 1974 CESI organised the first teacher training course on computing. Twenty-six teachers were requested to participate in a pilot scheme to provide a course in computer programming.

At the turn of the century the organisation was renamed as the Computers in Education Society of Ireland, CESI.

In 2024, CESI affairs are governed by a National Executive Committee which is elected each year at the AGM after the annual conference.
