= Council circle =

Indigenous North American assembly

A council circle is a distinctive feature at the center of some tribal communities in North America. The historical function of the council circles is debated. Some suggest that the talking circles are ceremonial, and others support a hypothesis that they were places for political discussion that suggest aboriginal democracy.

In current use, the council circle is often synonymous with the talking circle, and is a means of group communication that promotes input from all the members. The practice has been adopted by people of many cultures. A talking stick, or other significant or impromptu object, is passed around the circle, and only the circle member holding the stick is allowed to speak, though he or she may allow others to interject.

Talking sticks in the context of the council circle may have been used pre-historically by indigenous peoples to create egalitarian forums. Photographs show that some talking sticks were very tall, suggesting that circle participants would have stood when speaking.

== See also ==
- Center for Council
- Learning circle
- Study circle
