= Rubén Grilo =

Spanish artist

- Born: 1981 (age 43–44); Lugo, Spain
- Education: University of Barcelona, Barcelona; Rijksakademie van Beeldende Kunsten, Amsterdam
- Known for: Sculpture Installation Digital Media
- Movement: Contemporary art

Rubén Grilo (born 1981 in Lugo, Spain) is a Spanish contemporary artist based in Berlin. His practice includes sculpture, animation, sound installation and digital media.

== Education ==
He studied Fine Arts at the University of Barcelona and is an alumnus of the Rijksakademie van Beeldende Kunsten in Amsterdam (2011–2012). He was the recipient of the Visual Art Grants by the Fundación Botín (2013).

== Work ==
Grilo has exhibited his work in several institutions and galleries such as Fundació Joan Miró - Espai 13, Barcelona (2016), Union Pacific Gallery, London (2016), Hildesheim Kunstverein (2014), Bard Centre for Curatorial Studies in Annandale-on-Hudson, New York (2011) and Galería NoguerasBlanchard, among others. His work includes several collaborations such as with artist Spiros Hadjidjanos in CA2M (2014) and Metaphysics-VR for the ZKM Center for Art and Media, Karlsruhe (2017–18).

In 2014 he curated an exhibition at Future Gallery Berlin titled Twenty Thousand Years of Yarn in which he exhibited a mix of artworks and artifacts made by artists, corporations and natural phenomena.

During the 9th Berlin Biennale (2016) he launched a commercially available non-drying oil paint called Everfresh, made in collaboration with Kremer Pigmente.
