= TeachMeet =

TeachMeet logo from the BETT 2010 TeachMeet

A TeachMeet is an informal meeting (in the style of an unconference), organised by teacher for teachers to share good practice, practical innovations and personal insights on teaching in a convivial atmosphere. TeachMeet events are open to all, do not charge an entry fee, and take place in a social setting. These events are often organized to coincide with other educational events like the Scottish Learning Festival and the British Educational Technology and Training Show (BETT).

Participants volunteer to demonstrate good practice they've delivered over the past year, or discuss a resource that enhances classroom practice.

== History ==
Originally conceived in the summer of 2006 in Edinburgh, Scotland, under the name "ScotEduBlogs Meetup". The new name, TeachMeet, was created by Ewan McIntosh and agreed upon by the attendees of the first event. The 2nd Edition was held in Glasgow on September 20th, 2006.

The 5th TeachMeet was the first to be held at the BETT Show in London. In 2009, TeachMeet was introduced to Ireland by the Computers in Education Society of Ireland (CESI).

In 2010 TeachMeet 'Takeover' was introduced at BETT, where teachers took over vendors stands in the main conference to bring the TeachMeet discussion out of the Apex Room and onto the exhibition floor.

In 2017 the Malaysian TeachMeets decided to make all presentations 2 minutes to make it a quicker format.

TeachMeets are now regular occurrences in Scotland, England, Ireland, Australia, Canada, Croatia, Czech Republic, Denmark, Malaysia, Sweden, the United States, New Zealand.

In New Zealand the TeachMeet is virtual and is run via Google Hangouts. Since global travel restrictions were put in place in March 2020, many TeachMeets have been convened using online platforms.

Very little research has been reported on Teachmeets until 2022 when Dr Mags Amond completed a PhD study titled "Desire Lines in Open Space: An Exploration of the TeachMeet Phenomenon" to the School of Education at Trinity College Dublin. Her study conducted an Interpretative Phenomonological Analysis of data arising from her surveys and interviews to clarify the nature of Teachmeets and to identify the niche within the world of teacher professional learning.

== Common features ==
The following features are often part of a Teachmeet, but the format changes according to the size of the meeting and the preferences of the organisers:

- Micro-presentations - lasting 7 minutes
- Nano-presentations - lasting 2 minutes nano presentation (3-5 one after the other)
- Round-table break-outs - lasting 15 minutes or so, allowing focussed discussion around a theme, with a volunteer facilitator
- Random selection of speakers - from a pool of willing participants
- Backchannel - to let non-attendees participate or follow proceedings that are broadcast on social media timelines
