= Sweden Social Web Camp =

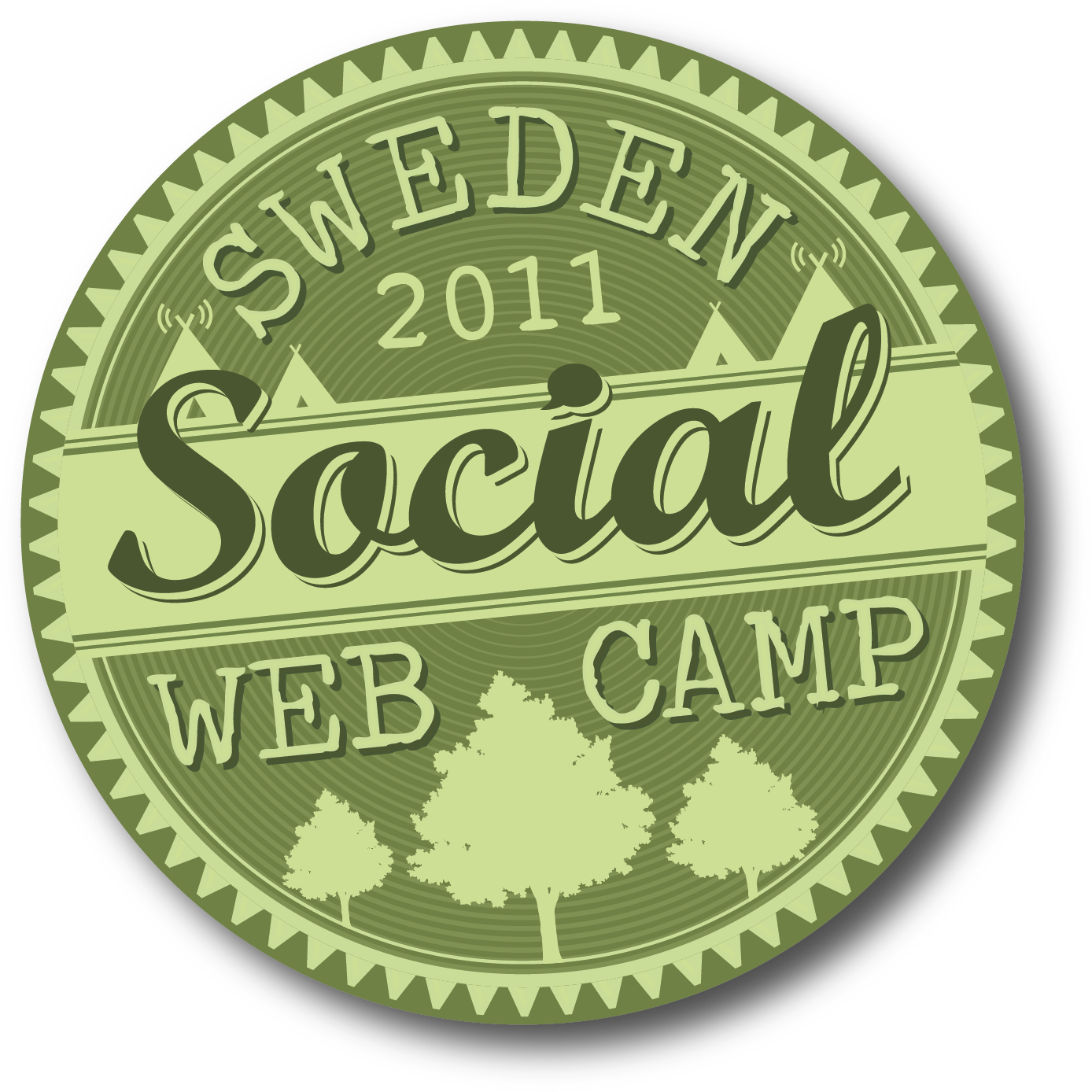
Logo for Sweden Social Web Camp 2011

Sweden Social Web Camp (SSWC) was a Swedish user-generated conference (or unconference) held on the island of Tjärö, Karlshamn Municipality, active between 2009 and 2013. The event focussed on internet and web technology and use in the context of social media. The format was open, participatory workshop-events, the content of which is provided by the participants. As anyone could decide to run a workshop during the event other, non-social web, subjects have of course turned up on the unconference grid.

== History ==
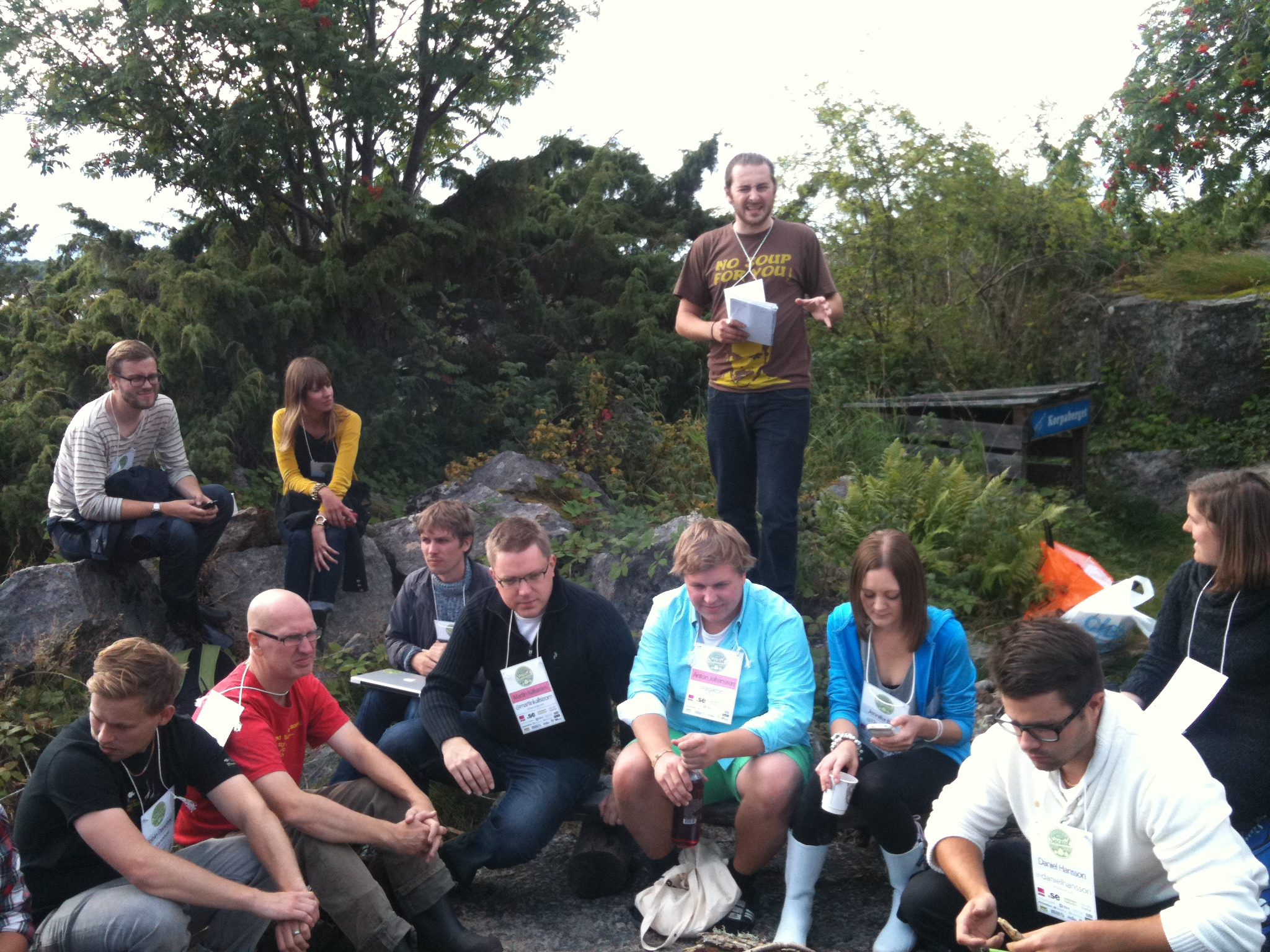
Workshop at SSWC 2011

In 2009, Tomas Wennström and Kristin Heinonen told some friends via their blog that they were considering meeting up a few people on an island and talk about the social web. Within hours, they had nearly a hundred replies from people who wanted to come, and they decided that they should try to do something for a wider audience. Eventually 286 people attended a two-day Sweden Social Web Camp in 2009, and workshops on about 60 different topics

In 2010, 409 people attended Sweden Social Web Camp. A book, SSWC-boken, was crowdsourced by Mattias Boström and 180+ essays making up 591 pages were printed and sold at the event. Many of the essays were also workshop topics at the event itself.

In 2011, about 400 people attended an expanded format where an extra day was added and the agenda for the first day was crowdsourced beforehand and voted on. By some, this year was considered the best year so far.

The last known public event happened in 2013. SSWC took a year off in 2014, with a plan to come back in 2015. The 2015 event was then cancelled due to the sale of the island of Tjärö and closure of most of its infrastructure, and failure to find an appropriate replacement site.

== Structure ==
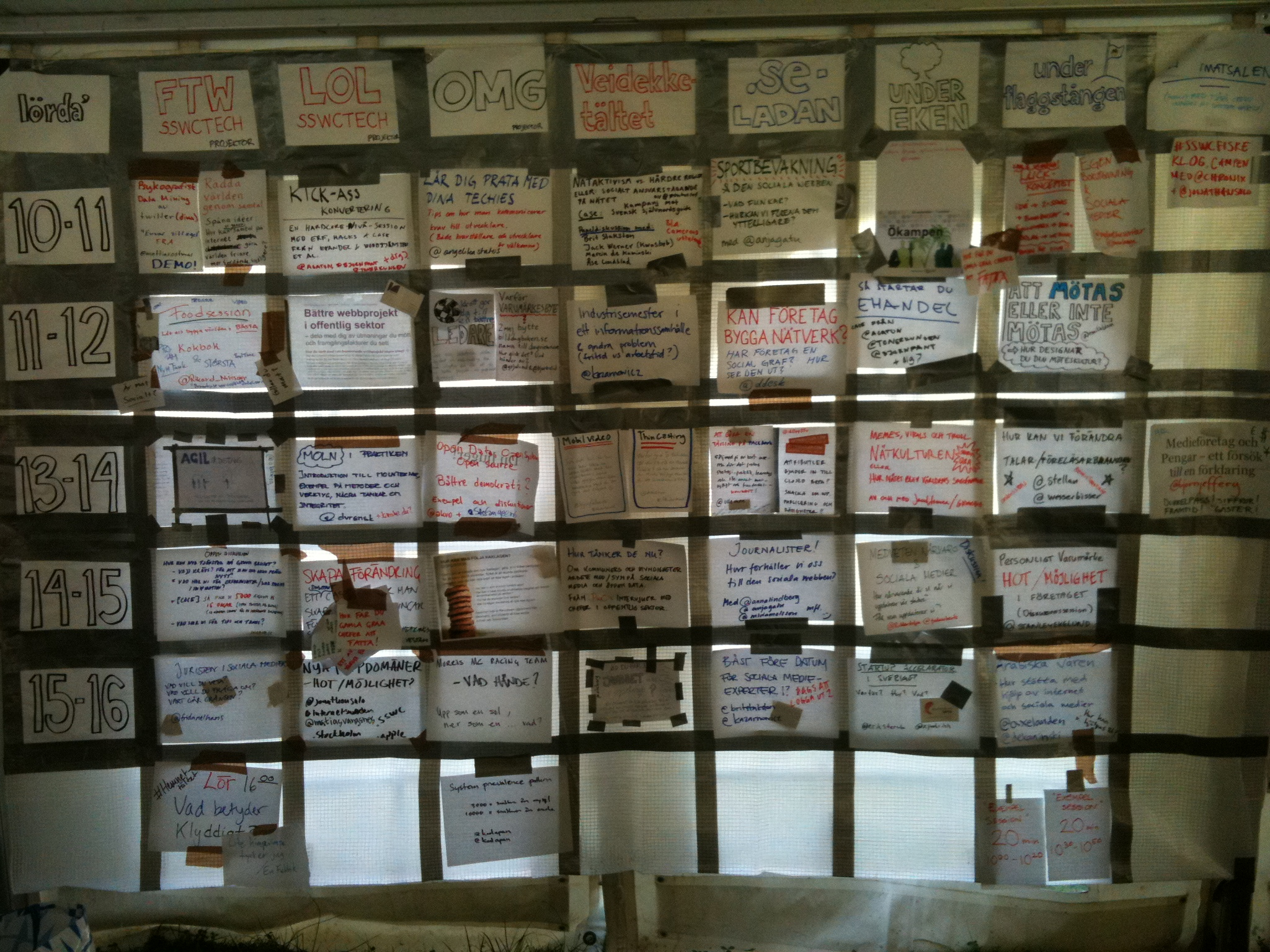
The unconference grid at SSWC 2011

The first two years (2009, 2010) was held as a traditional unconference where the content was decided by the participants on the spot, booking locations on the island using the unconference grid. The third year an extra day was added and the suggested topics were crowd-sourced beforehand and an online voting system was used to vote for the most popular topics. The 35 topics with the highest votes were allocated a slot on the first day.

Organised travel, called the Twittering buses, contributed to the event and many consider travelling with the buses an essential part of the experience.

== See also ==
- Unconference
- Blekinge archipelago
