= Unconference =

Participant-driven meeting

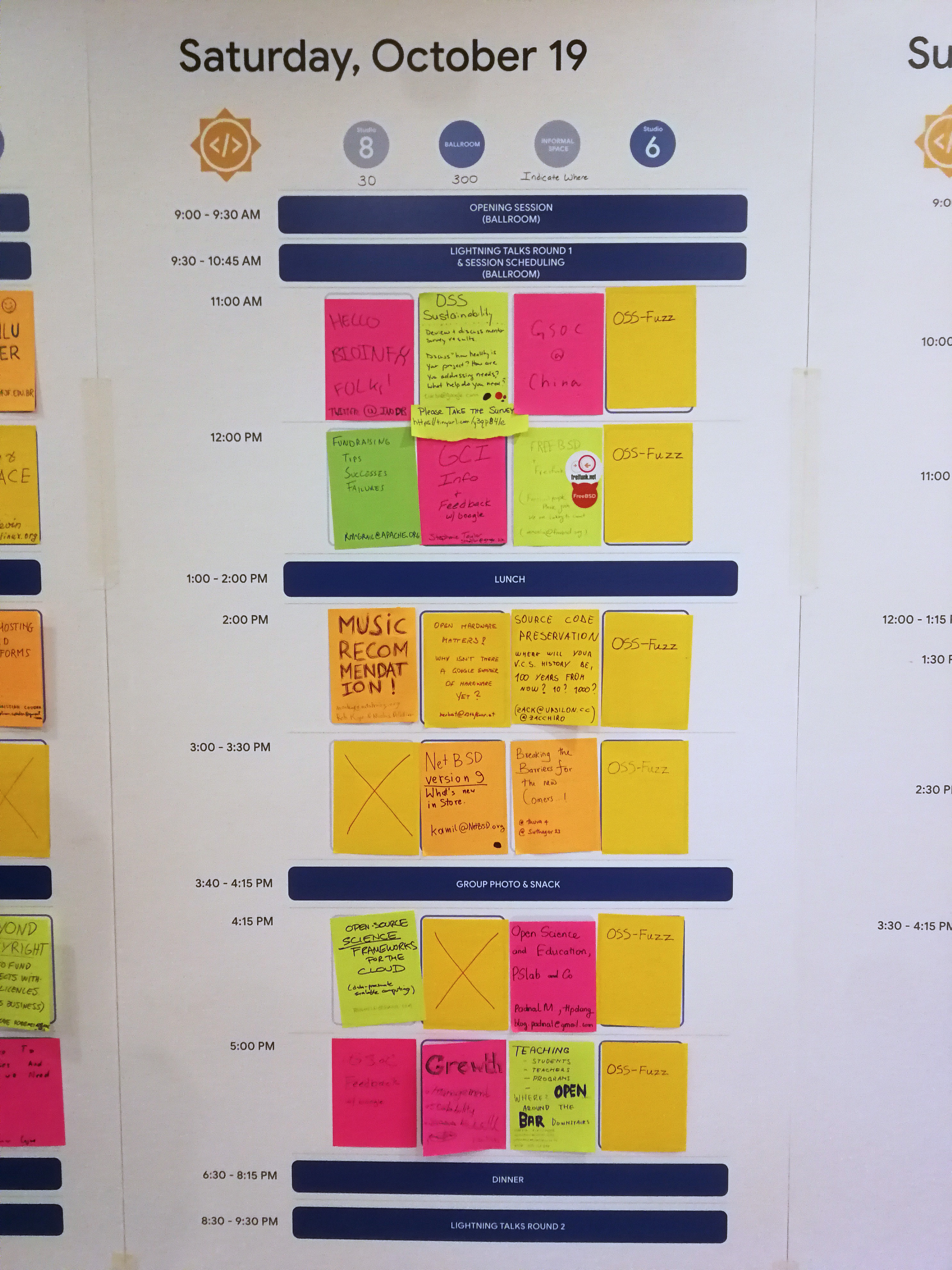
Open space session scheduling at an unconference

An unconference is a participant-driven meeting. The term "unconference" has been applied to a wide range of gatherings that try to avoid hierarchical aspects of a conventional conference, such as sponsored presentations and top-down organization.

== History ==
Unconference signup at Wikiconference USA with a participant

According to Tim O'Reilly, a predecessor of an unconference was a gathering organized by Alexander von Humboldt in 1828, which had a reduced emphasis on formal speeches and instead emphasized informal connections.

The term "unconference" first appeared in an announcement for the annual XML developers conference in 1998.

Unconferences often use variations on Open Space Technology, the format/method developed by Harrison Owen in 1985. Owen's 1993 book Open Space Technology: a User's Guide discussed many of the techniques now associated with unconferences, although his book does not use that term.

The term was used by Lenn Pryor when discussing BloggerCon (a series of conferences organized by Dave Winer and first held October 4–5, 2003, at Harvard's Berkman Center for Internet & Society).

Sarah Winge, the organizer (with Tim O'Reilly) of Foo Camp, an early unconference, drew on her experience of open space and conversations with Harrison Owen to develop the format. The first Foo Camp happened October 10–12, 2003, in Sebastopol, California. In 2005 some of the attendees from previous years decided to produce their own "Bar" Camp. These three events, BloggerCon, Foo Camp and BarCamp helped to popularize the term "unconference".

== Format ==
Typically at an unconference, the agenda is created by the attendees at the beginning of the meeting. Anyone who wants to initiate a discussion on a topic can claim a time and a space. Some unconference sessions (for example at FooCamp or BarCamp) are led by the participant who suggested its topic; other unconference sessions are basically open discussions of the session topic.

An "unconference" is particularly useful when participants generally have a high level of expertise or knowledge in the field the conference convenes to discuss.

== Facilitation styles ==
An unconference can be conducted using a number of facilitation styles. Some of these are:

- Birds of a feather
- Dotmocracy
- Fishbowl
- Ignite
- Lightning talks
- Open Space Technology
- PechaKucha
- Speed geeking
- World café (conversation)

== Notable unconferences ==
- BarCamp
- FooCamp
- EdCamp
