= Learning circle =

The learning circle is a mechanism for organizing and honoring the collective wisdom of a group.

== History and overview ==
Learning circles are present in many indigenous cultures. For example, in some Native American cultures, councils of elders come together to understand problems in a spirit of shared community in "wisdom circles".

The term learning circle has been used to describe group efforts with clear links to social change. Over time and across countries, civic organizations, neighborhood communities, trade unions, churches and social justice groups have used the idea of learning circles to empower their members to make choices and take action. Groups have used the term study circle or learning circle to refer to a form of adult education. For example, Educators for Community Engagement, found that learning circles—with their principles of equal participation, reciprocity, and honoring of collective wisdom—embody the democratic principles of service-learning partnerships. They use learning circles, rather than more traditional forms of group meetings, to structure their annual conferences.

Primary teachers use a simple form of learning circles when they gather the students at the rug for "circle time". Many educators are using learning circles to connect students from around the world. Among the goals of this activity are helping students to develop trust and respect for diversity of experience, and fostering both listening and speaking skills among peers.

Researchers have used learning circles as a form of professional development to improve their practice. A similar term, quality circle, was used in the 1980s to characterize the successful practice in corporate settings in which the hierarchical boundaries between workers and managers are flattened to encourage participatory management and team leadership. Quality circles, originally associated with Japanese management and manufacturing techniques developed in Japan after World War II, were based on lectures of W. Edwards Deming (Joel & Ross, 1982). The goal was to encourage everyone to develop a strong sense of ownership over the process and products of the group.

== See also ==
- Dialogue
- Collaborative learning
- Community of inquiry
- Council circle
- Fishbowl (conversation)
- Learning community
- Literature circle
- Literature Circles in EFL
- Participatory action research
- Round Table in Arthurian legend
- Socratic method § Socratic Circles
- T-groups
- World café (conversation)
