= Oscar Olsson =

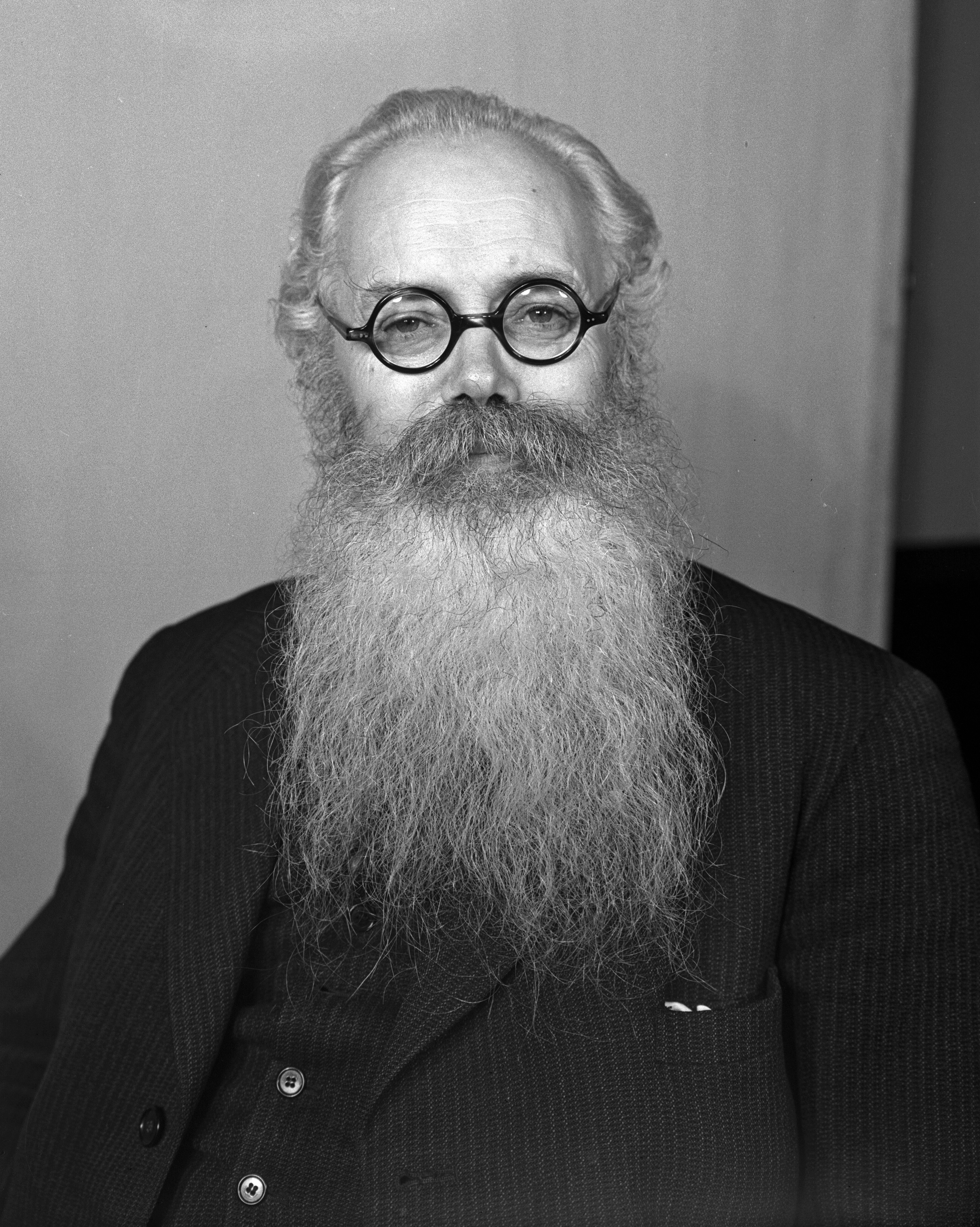
Oscar Olsson

Oscar Ulrik Bernhardin Olsson (Helsingborg, 4 July 1877 – Danderyd, 25 January 1950) is regarded as the father of study circles. He created the first study circle in Sweden in 1902 as part of the International Order of Good Templars.

== Study circles ==
The study circle for the International Order of Good Templars was the first environment for establishing the basis and principles of the study circle. According to Olsson the features of a study circle were:

- People studied in small groups, often at home.
- Study material was rare.
- Teachers were not considered a necessary prerequisite of study. The leader of the group was an organiser and he or she possessed no theoretical qualifications.
- People supplemented their group studies by attending lectures or meetings.
- Circle members had no previous theoretical qualifications, but a good deal of practical experience.
- They learnt to discuss, argue, show consideration for others, accept defeat and share responsibility.
- They experienced a sense of community and identity.
- The knowledge they acquired could be directly related to their everyday lives.
- Studies began at the initial cognitive level of the members and were guided by their needs.

It became apparent that the study circles were a way of empowering and emancipating the working class, as higher education was not a possibility for them due to financial reasons and the need for the young generations to provide for the whole family as soon as they were physically able to. So the study circle was a way of gaining knowledge and education without the financial necessities. As Olson put it, "The emancipation of the working class should be a task for the workers themselves".

== Awards ==
Olsson was awarded the Illis quorum in 1947.

== Books by Olsson ==
- Olsson, O. (1914) Bildningssynpunkter. Stockholm: Oscar Eklunds tryckeri.
- Olsson, O. (1922) Det svenska folkbildningsarbetet. En sammanfattning Stockholm: Oscar Eklunds tryckeri.
