= Speed geeking =

Presentation format

Speed Geek event during the launch of TechSoup Canada

Speed geeking is a participatory process used to quickly view multiple presentations within a fixed period of time. Speed geeking gets its name from speed dating, as it employs similar techniques.

== Method ==
A large room is selected as the speed geeking venue. All the presenters are arranged in a large circle along the edge of the room. The remaining members of the audience stand at the center of the room. Ideally there are about 6-7 audience members for each presenter. One person acts as the facilitator.

The facilitator rings a bell to start proceedings. Once proceedings start, the audience splits up into groups and each group goes to one of the presenters. Presenters have a short duration, usually 5 minutes, to give their presentation and answer questions. At the end of the five minutes, the facilitator rings a bell. At this point, each group moves over to the presenter to their right and the timer starts once more. The session ends when every group has attended all the presentations.

== See also ==
- Lightning talk
- PechaKucha
- Ignite
- World café (conversation)
