= Open space technology =

Practice of creating conference agenda and content during the conference itself

Open space technology (OST) is a method for organizing and running a meeting or multi-day conference where participants are invited to focus on a specific, important task or purpose. The agenda and schedule of presentations are partly or mostly unknown until people begin arriving. The scheduling of speakers, topics, and locations is created by people attending once they arrive. A debriefing document is created at the end of each OST meeting, summarizing what worked and what did not. Harrison Owen created the method in the early 1980s as an alternative to pre-planned conferences, where conference organizers predetermined speakers and time was often scheduled months in advance. OST instead relies on decisions made by participants once they are physically present at the live event venue. OST was among the top ten organizational development tools cited between 2004 and 2013.

== History ==
The approach was originated by Harrison Owen, an Episcopal priest whose academic background and training centered on the nature and function of myth, ritual, and culture. In the middle 1960s, he left academia to work with a variety of organizations, including small West African villages, large corporations and non-governmental organization, urban (American and African) community organizations, peace corps, regional medical programs, national institutes of health, and veterans' administration. Along the way, he discovered that his study of myth, ritual, and culture directly applied to these social systems. In 1977, he started a consulting company to explore the culture of organizations in transformation as a theorist and practicing consultant. Harrison convened the First International Symposium on Organization Transformation as a traditional conference. Afterward, participants told him the best parts were the coffee breaks. So when he did it again, open space was his way of making the whole of the conference one big coffee break, albeit with a central theme (purpose, story, question, or "myth") that would guide the group's self-organization. Following Owen's experiment, the Organization Transformation Symposium continued in open-space format for over twenty years. But soon after the first open space, participants began using open space in their work and reporting back on their learning. One event, convened in India around the theme "The Business of Business is Learning," attracted local media attention that was noticed by The New York Times, which later published their own stories on open space in 1988 and 1994. Owen wrote a brief user guide to support further experimentation and practice. Eventually, an expanded guide was published by Berrett-Koehler. In the 1980s, Owen was considered by many large corporations to be one of several new-age consultants whose methods might encourage employee participation and interest in company problems.

== Central elements ==
=== Self-organization ===
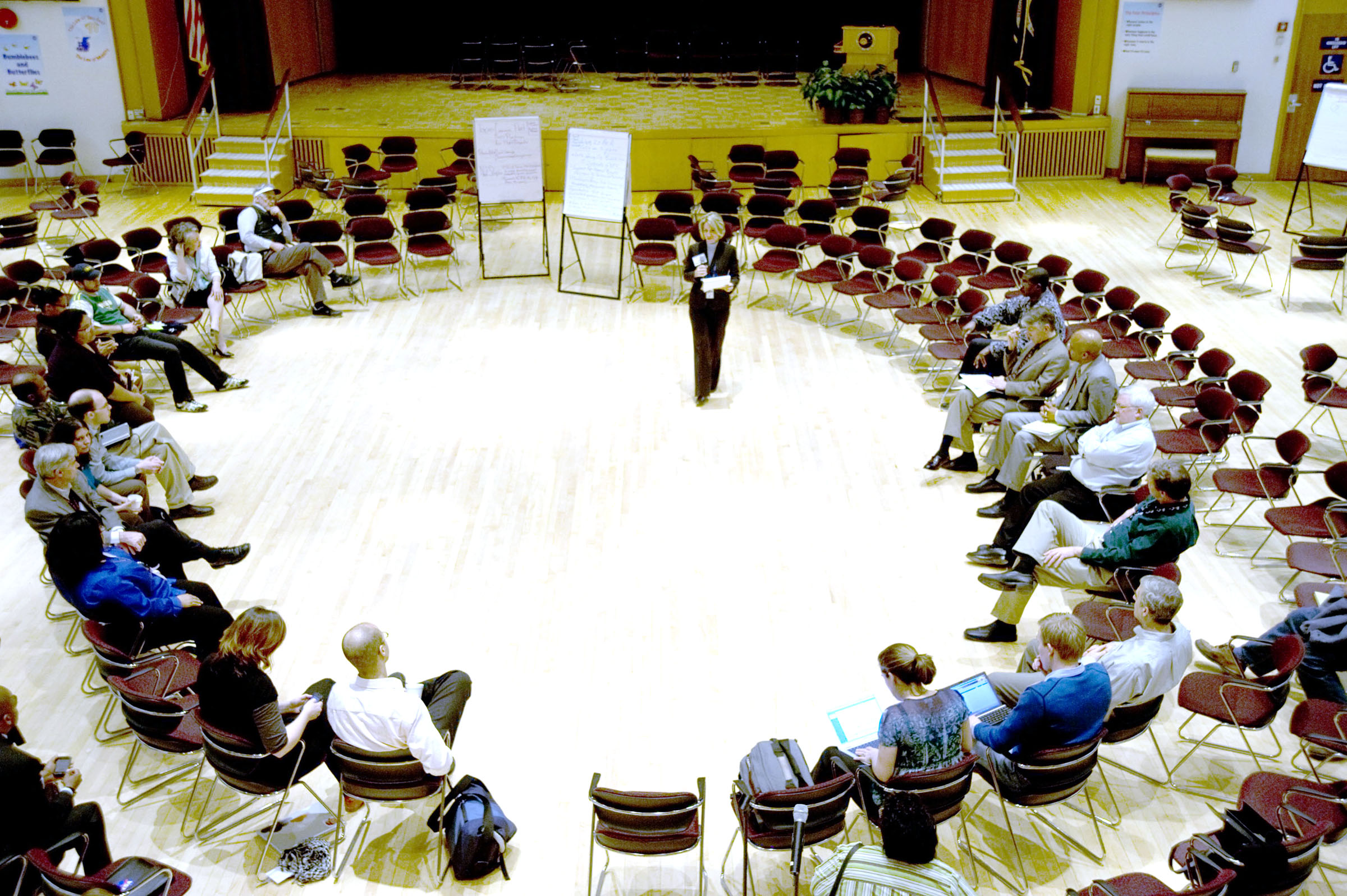
Open space meeting at NASA Goddard Space Flight Center

"Open space" meetings are, to a lesser or greater degree, "self-organizing." Participants and speakers have all been invited or paid to attend. However, after confirming the overall theme and focus, the meeting organizer-sponsor is much less active. The details of the daily speaking schedule are, to a lesser or greater degree, created and organized by attending participants and speakers "on the day of." Given the potentially chaotic nature of open-space meetings, when the event begins, the organizer-sponsor gives their best shot at focusing on the theme, ground rules, values, and energies of the conference. This often includes short introductions for each speaker present. The organizer-sponsor explains the "self-organizing" process and any rules for changing times, talks, and schedules once made public. The ideal event facilitator is "fully present and invisible," "holding a space" for participants to self-organize rather than micro-managing activity and conversations.

=== Outcomes ===
Because the agenda of an open space meeting emerges like a living thing, what exactly is going to happen or be addressed is still being determined to some degree. Still, several meaningful outcomes can be specifically built into the process (safety, trust, courtesy). Open space meetings are usually convened for a few hours to a few days. At the end of some (significantly longer) open space meetings, a proceedings document is compiled from the notes taken in the breakout sessions. This is distributed, on paper or electronically, to all participants and used as the basis for prioritizing issues, identifying next steps, and continuing the work beyond the meeting itself.

== Where OST has been used ==
Several other approaches share one or more features with OST: "unconferences", e.g. FooCamp and BarCamp. Both FooCamp and BarCamp are participant-driven, like OST, but neither is organized around a pre-set theme or aimed at solving a problem. The first Foo Camp was organized by Tim O'Reilly and Sara Winge; because Winge had been a student of Owen, many elements similar to OST are used in Foo Camp. The agile software development community first used the open space approach at the Agile/XP Universe conference in 2002. That group eventually developed into the Agile Alliance, which has supported the use of open space in the Agile community. Since then, Open Space has been used for leading Agile transformation and for requirements gathering in Agile projects. A design sprint (a meeting technique related to design thinking and promoted by Google Ventures) is similar to OST in that participants are invited by an organizer to work collaboratively on solving a problem, with the help of a facilitator who is trained in running such meetings. (Google also uses OST methods, which one Google engineer described as "almost the opposite of sprints … a minimally designed conversation that still gets groups to a solid set of agreements".) Some meeting organizers use open space techniques and other methods to avoid what they see as "shortcomings" of OST, such as an atmosphere that is potentially unfriendly for introverts.

=== In education ===
Research on OST in higher education suggests that OST increases learner motivation (Patton et al., 2016; Pereira & Figueiredo, 2010) and stimulates critical thinking (Van Woezik et al., 2019).

== See also ==
- Art of Hosting
