= Spiros Hadjidjanos =

German sculptor

- Born: 1978 (age 47–48); Athens, Greece
- Education: Athens School of Fine Arts; Universität der Künste, Berlin
- Known for: Sculpture, photography, digital media
- Movement: Post-conceptualism

Spiros Hadjidjanos (born 1978 in Athens, Greece) is a contemporary artist living in Berlin. His work includes sculpture, photography, and digital media.

== Education ==
Hadjidjanos has studied at the Athens School of Fine Arts (2002–07), Leiden University (2004-06) and the UdK Berlin (2008–10). He has been awarded with the UdK Meisterschülerpreis des Präsidenten, DAAD postgraduate award and Fulbright Scholarship.

== Work ==
His work has been exhibited in several venues including KW Institute for Contemporary Art, Berlin (2016), Musée d'Art Moderne de la Ville de Paris (2016), Palais de Tokyo, Paris (2017), Städel Museum, Frankfurt (2017), Foam, Amsterdam (2018) and ZKM Center for Art and Media, Karlsruhe (2019).

In 2016, Hadjidjanos collaborated with Bill Kouligas in an audio-visual piece produced to be presented at the Volksbühne in Berlin in the context of Decession. The artwork included a light installation responding to wireless router communication signals.
