= PechaKucha =

Storytelling format

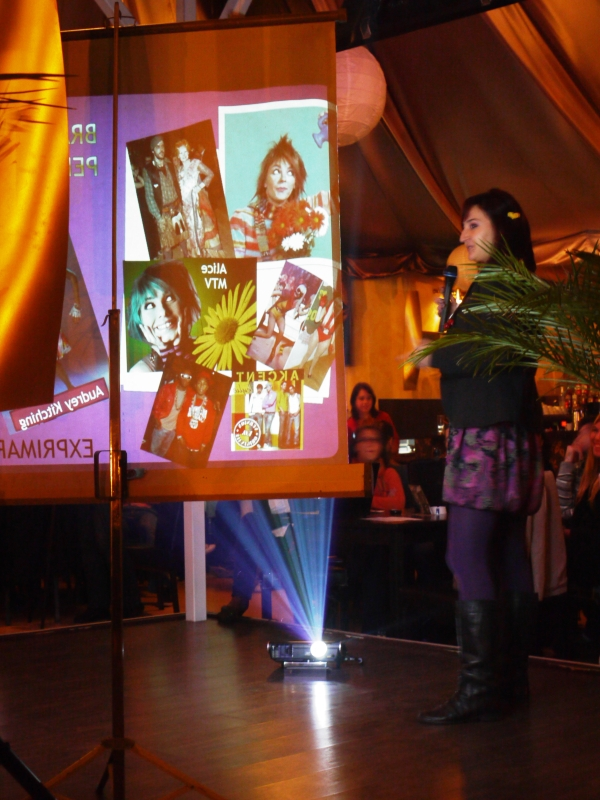
Speaker at a PechaKucha Night event in Cluj-Napoca, Romania

PechaKucha (Japanese: ぺちゃくちゃ, IPA: [petɕa kɯ̥tɕa], chit-chat) is a storytelling format in which a presenter shows 20 slides for 20 seconds per slide. At a PechaKucha Night, individuals gather at a venue to share personal presentations about their work. The PechaKucha format can be used, for example, in business presentations to clients or staff, as well as in education settings.

== History ==
Inspired by their desire to "talk less, show more", Tokyo's Klein-Dytham Architecture (KDa) created PechaKucha in February 2003. It was a way to attract people to SuperDeluxe, their experimental event space in Roppongi, and to enable young designers to meet, show their work, and exchange ideas in 6 minutes and 40 seconds. In 2004, cities in Europe began hosting PK Nights and days, followed over the years by hundreds of others.

As of April 2019, PechaKucha Nights had been held in more than 1,142 cities worldwide. More than 3 million people have attended a PechaKucha Night. PechaKucha is a registered trademark of PechaKucha, Inc.

== Format ==
A typical PechaKucha Night includes 8 to 14 presentations. Organizers in some cities have customized their own format. For example, in Groningen, Netherlands, two six-minute, 40-second presentation slots are given to a live band, and the final 20 seconds of each presentation includes an immediate critique of the presentation by the host's sidekicks.

The audience often represents design, architecture, photography, art, and creative fields, as well as academia. Presenters share creative work or speak about passion topics such as travels, research projects, student projects, hobbies, collections, or other interests. Video art and essays has also been presented at some events.

== See also ==
- Lightning talk: A similar presentation format.
- Elevator pitch: A short-format pitch that takes an elevator journey to explain.
- Ignite: A similar presentation format.
- Speed geeking: Five-minute presentations that are simultaneous, rather than sequential. Participants rotate through presentations in one room or chat space.
- PowerPoint karaoke: An activity where speakers give a presentation from a slide deck they have never seen.
