= Jack Zimmerman =

Australian rules footballer

Personal information
- Full name: John Paul Zimmerman
- Born: 9 February 1918; Footscray, Victoria
- Died: 2 September 1944 (aged 26); Heidelberg, Victoria
- Original team: Seddon Rovers
- Height: 185 cm (6 ft 1 in)
- Weight: 82.5 kg (182 lb)

Playing career^{1}
| Years | Club | Games (Goals) |
| 1937–39 | Footscray | 14 (2) |
- ^{1} Playing statistics correct to the end of 1939.

John Paul Zimmerman (19 February 1918 – 2 September 1944) was an Australian rules footballer who played with Footscray in the Victorian Football League (VFL).

== Sources ==
- Jack Zimmerman's playing statistics from AFL Tables
- Holmesby, Russell & Main, Jim (2007). The Encyclopedia of AFL Footballers. 7th ed. Melbourne: Bas Publishing.
- Jack Zimmerman's obituary
