= DataMeet =

Indian user-generated community

DataMeet is a user-generated community primarily focused around open data and data science in India. DataMeet was registered as a trust in February 2014. Typical discussions are around collecting, arranging and using open data. DataMeet events are held in Ahmedabad, Bangalore, Delhi, Mumbai and Pune.

== History ==
DataMeet started as a small google group with meetups in Bangalore and later spread to other Indian cities. DataMeet now involves Meetups, Workshops, Hackathons and a yearly event called Open Data Camp.

== Current activity ==
=== Meetups ===
DataMeet frequently organizes open meetups related to open data and other social issues.

=== Open Data Camp ===
Every summer since 2012, DataMeet has organized a two-day open data event called Open Data Camp in Bangalore. Open Data Camp has also been held in Delhi since November 2014.

=== Hackathons ===
For 2014 Indian general election, the largest ever elections in the world, DataMeet organized a hackathon focusing on election-related open data.

=== Other Activity ===
Open City Initiative: DataMeet is developing a repository of urban data under the Open City Initiative
