= BETT =

Educational technology trade exhibition

Bett Global
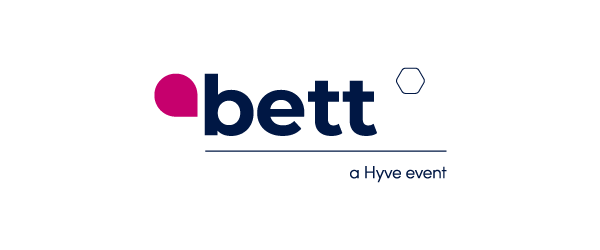
- Genre: Trade Exhibition
- Frequency: Annual
- Venue: ExCeL London
- Locations: London; Bangkok; São Paulo
- Coordinates: 51°30′27″N 0°1′47″E
- Country: England
- Inaugurated: 1985, as the British Educational Training and Technology Show
- Next event: 21–23 January 2026
- Organiser: Hyve Group
- Website: www.bettshow.com

Bett (formerly known as the British Educational Training and Technology Show) is a global series of education shows organised by Hyve Group marketing information technology in education. The flagship show is located in the UK, with satellite events in Asia & Brasil. Bett is also a global community for education technology, which hosts webinars, CPD sessions and publish articles from the leaders in education.

== History ==
The show was first held in January 1985 as the "Hi Technology and Computers in Education Exhibition" at the Barbican Centre, central London, in association with the British Educational Suppliers Association. As the use of technology in education increased, so did the show, and had outgrown the Barbican by 1993, when the move to Olympia was made.

The show has also expanded from being a purely technology show, and whilst it has played host to companies ranging from multinationals Microsoft, Google and Apple Inc. to small single-product firms, it has also created themed zones for exhibitors, such as those specialising in SEN provision. Introduced in 2015, the "Bett Futures" feature aimed at selecting and promoting 30 educational technology start-ups, selected by a panel of expert educators.

A large number of seminars from well-known providers are held at Bett, which offer training (Continuing Professional Development) opportunities for education professionals. The then Education Secretary Michael Gove gave keynote speeches at the 2012 and 2014 events. In 2015 the then Education Secretary Nicky Morgan gave her first opening keynote for the show. Professor Brian Cox has twice been keynote speaker, in 2013 and 2020.

Criticised in the past for perhaps marginalising teachers due to the increasing business nature of the show, the former organisers (i2i Events Group) introduced a number of teacher friendly events such as TeachMeet and edtech start-up initiative Bett Futures, to turn this around.

== Locations ==
=== Bett UK ===
London is home to Bett's flagship event which is international with visitors from more than 120 countries. Thousands of visitors gather to meet with hundreds of EdTech providers, join CPD content sessions and network with their peers. The first Bett show was held in London in 1985, initially at the Barbican Centre. In 2002, it expanded to the National and Grand Halls at the Olympia exhibition centre, with a move to the ExCeL London in London's Docklands in 2013, its current venue. Bett celebrated its 30th anniversary at the 2014 show, which attracted 35,044 visitors from 113 countries.

=== Bett Asia ===
Bett Asia is an education technology conference and expo. In 2022, Bett Asia was held in Bangkok, to gather senior education leaders, educators and innovators to share intelligence on how to improve learning in the 21st century. Bett Asia returns in September 2026, to be held in Kuala Lumpur, Malaysia

== Awards ==
The Bett Awards are an annual celebration for the highest levels of achievement by companies that exhibit at the Bett show and supply Information and Communications Technology (ICT) for education.

== Keynote speakers ==
Speakers in the past have included:

- Stephen Fry
- Ken Robinson
- Jimmy Wales
- Nicky Morgan
- Brian Cox
- Sugata Mitra
- John Couch
- Bob Geldof
- Steven Bartlett
