= Lightning talk =

Short presentation given at a conference

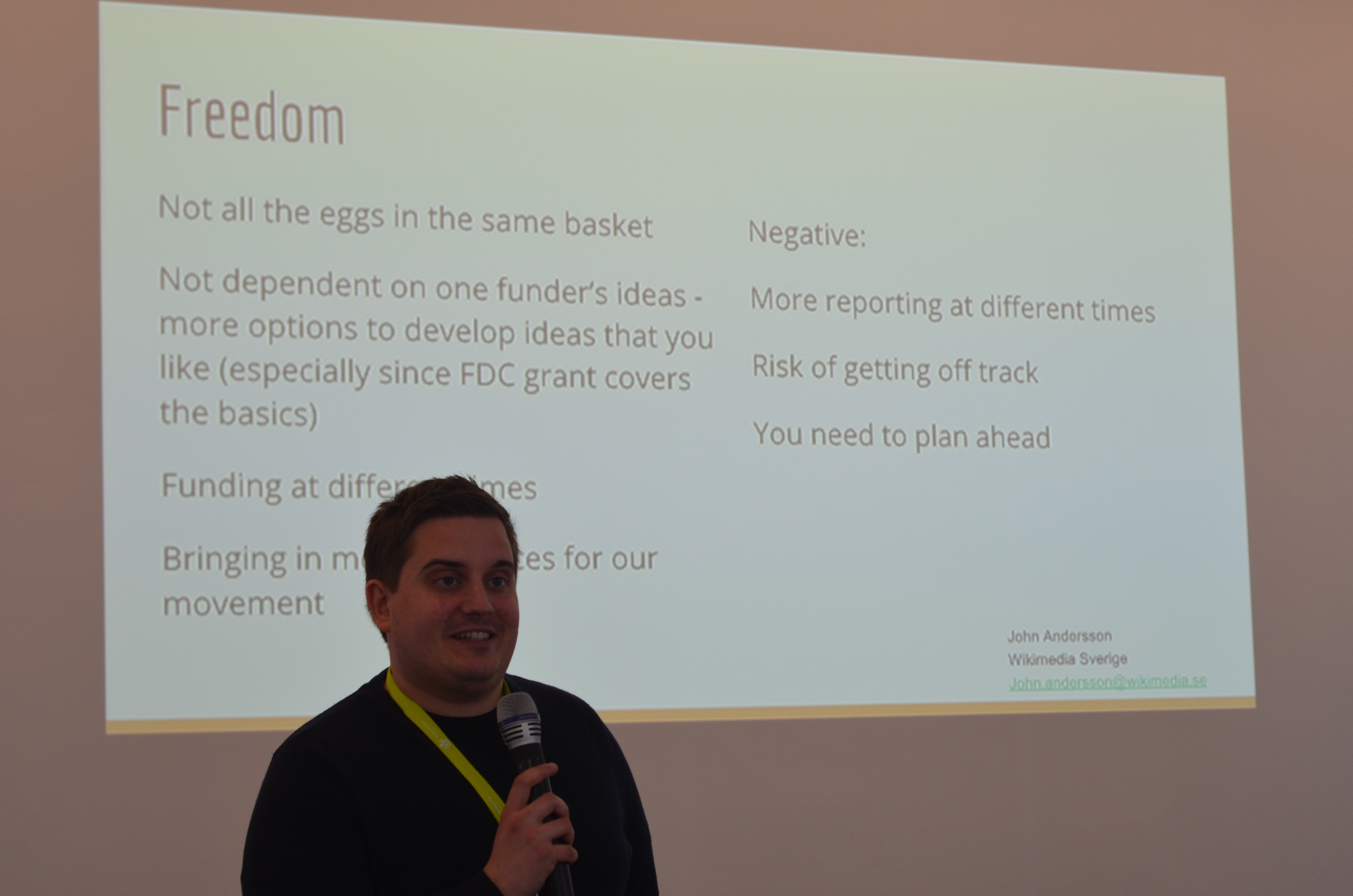
A lightning talk in Wikimedia Conference 2016

A lightning talk is a very short presentation lasting only a few minutes, given at a conference or similar forum. Several lightning talks will usually be delivered by different speakers in a single session, sometimes called a data blitz.

Some formats of lightning talk, including PechaKucha and Ignite, involve a specific number of slides that are automatically advanced at fixed intervals. Lightning talks are often referred to as ignite talks.

== History ==
The YAPC (Yet Another Perl Conference) 19100 Conference came up with the term "lightning talk" at Carnegie Mellon University in Pittsburgh. The term was coined by Mark Jason Dominus in June 2000. The practice of lightning talks was first known to be used at the Python Conference in 1997, but was not named until the YAPC 19100 Conference.

== Definition and format ==
Lightning talks are designed to be short presentations between five and ten minutes long, but are usually capped at five minutes. Most conferences will allot a segment of roughly 30 to 90 minutes long to speakers. Talks are arranged one after the other during the sessions. The talks are usually given at conferences in order for the event to have many speakers discuss a multitude of topics. The conferences are held in order for individuals to be able to share their ideas and concepts with people who have experience in the specific field. Lightning talks are brief and require the speaker to make their point clearly and rid the presentation of non-critical information. This causes the audience to be more attentive to the speaker and gain a broader array of knowledge from the presentations given.

The format of lightning talks varies greatly from conference to conference. Slides may be discouraged, and a single computer running a presentation program is used by all speakers. In general lightning talks are given in a format that can include slides but if so, the speaker must be careful not to read the details which they include.

The term data blitz is sometimes used to refer to a session of lightning talks, particularly at academic conferences in the sciences and social sciences such as the annual conference of the Society for Personality and Social Psychology.

== Significance ==
The goal of lightning talks is to articulate a topic in a quick, insightful, and clear manner. These concise and efficient talks are intended to gain the attention of the audience, communicate key information, and allow for several presenters to share their ideas in a brief period of time.
