= Ignite (event) =

Series of events

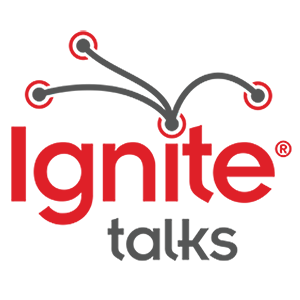
Ignite Talks logo

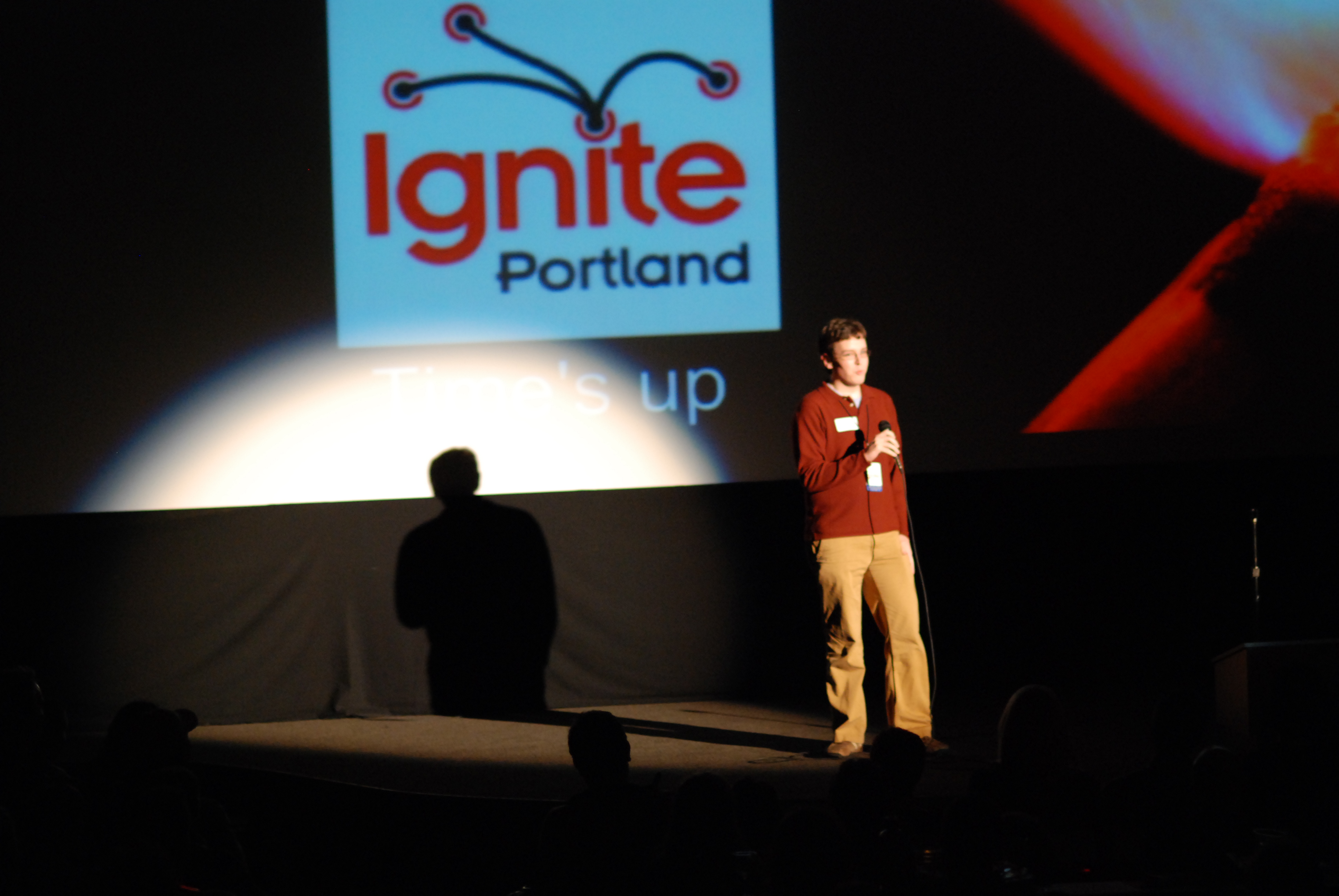
2009 Ignite event in Portland, Oregon

Ignite (Ignite Talks) is a series of events where speakers have five minutes to talk on a subject accompanied by 20 slides, for 15 seconds each, automatically advanced. Ignite started in Seattle, and it has spread to at least 350 organizing teams in cities, universities, governments and companies who have hosted thousands of events.

Ignite Talks uses a similar format to PechaKucha, which was founded three years earlier. Ignite presentations are a type of lightning talk.

The first Ignite was held in 2006 in Seattle, Washington by Brady Forrest and Bre Pettis, and was sponsored by O'Reilly Media and MAKE magazine. O'Reilly continued to support Ignite until November 2015 when the franchise was handed off to its founder, Brady Forrest, who formed Ignite Talks PBC, a Public Benefit Corporation. Ignite Talks PBC was formed to be an independent organization focusing on supporting Ignite events around the world and promoting public speaking. The organization was originally sponsored by PCH International, the parent company of Highway1, a hardware startup accelerator that Forrest led.

The Ignite format has been used by educators to help students build public speaking skills, including to teach students about presenting research in concise and engaging ways.
