= Halushchyntsi =

Rural locality in Ternopil Oblast, Ukraine

Halushchyntsi Hałuszczyńce (Polish)
- Interactive map of Halushchyntsi
- Coordinates: 49°31′33″N 25°54′13″E
- Country: Ukraine
- Oblast: Ternopil
- Raion: Ternopil

Population
  - Total: 681

Halushchyntsi is a selo in Ternopil Raion of Ternopil Oblast, Ukraine. It belongs to Pidvolochysk settlement hromada, one of the hromadas of Ukraine.

== History ==
Created in 1745, Hałuszczyńce was a small rural village in Galicia of about one hundred houses at the end of the XVIIIe century, two hundred in the middle of the XIXe century and three hundred before world war one.
After the "November Uprising" (1830-1831) in Poland, also known as the "Polish–Russian War" 1830–31 or the "Cadet Revolution", a group of Polish emigrants living in France sought to liberate Galicia from Austrian authority. In 1846 the peasants turned against the nobles and killed most of them.
During World War I, the Russians expropriated land from the farmers, causing the first wave of emigration to various other countries, including France, Brazil, the United States, United Kingdom, and Canada.
During World War II the Soviets and Nazis divided Galicia between themselves, killing thousands of Polish officers. Their families were deported to various gulags in Siberia. Once finally liberated, the survivors, after some time in Palestina, Iran, Africa or Mexico, emigrated again in order to reunite with families in the United States and Canada. A relative few also resettled in Australia and New Zealand.
Until 18 July 2020, Halushchyntsi belonged to Pidvolochysk Raion. The raion was abolished in July 2020 as part of the administrative reform of Ukraine, which reduced the number of raions of Ternopil Oblast to three. The area of Pidvolochysk Raion was merged into Ternopil Raion.

== Diaspora ==
Among the larger, prominent families living in Haluszczynce and emigrating were the Kordas, Pytel, Iskierski, Chruszcz, Dyba, Patron families

genealogy research

== Notable people ==
- Casimier Antoine Raphael Dzierzanowski (1872-1940) Polish general arrested during the Katin massacre and killed by the NKVD
- Tzsi Herman (Mendel) Jawetz (1878-1942) Zionist activist who died in the Przemyśl ghetto
- Bronisław Mirecki (1903-1986), Catholic priest who died in Haluszczynce

== Churches ==
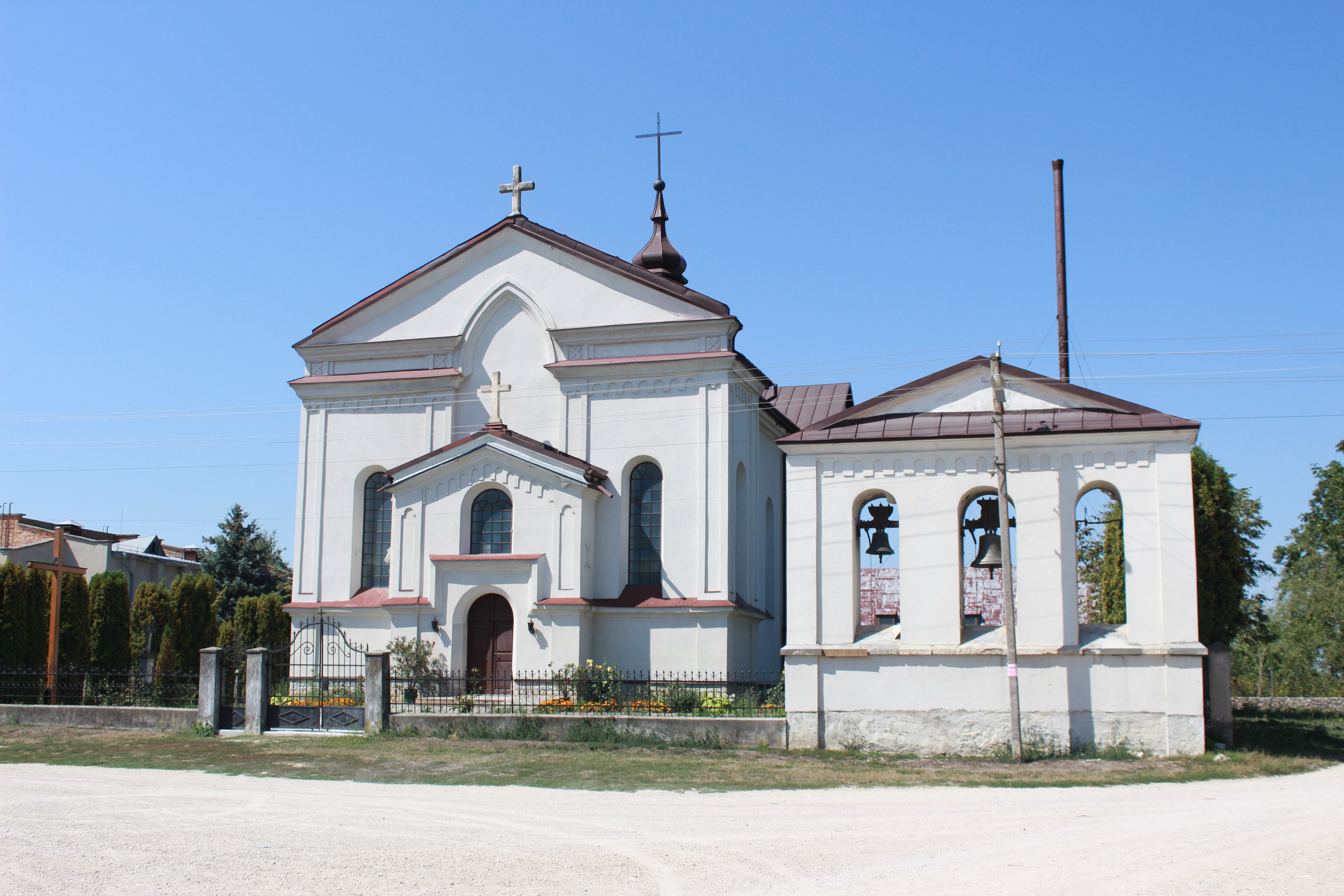
Saint John the Baptist (Roman Catholic)

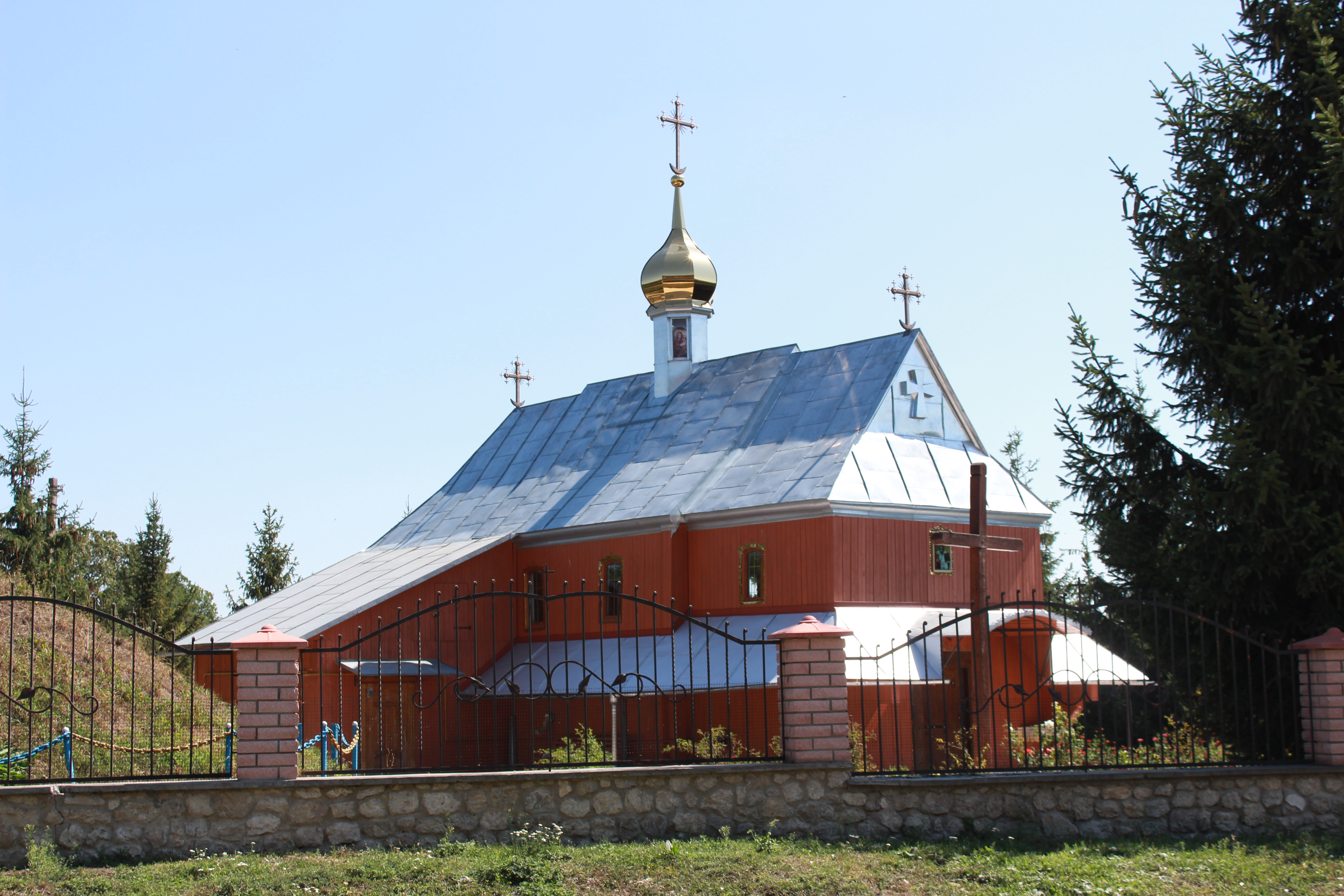
Saint Nicholas (Greek Catholic)
- Saint John the Baptist church (Roman Catholic)
- Saint Nicholas (Greek Catholic Church)

== See also ==
- http://www.nieobecni.com.pl/index.php?s=cmentarz&id=211
- https://kresy-siberia.org/museum-galleries/
- https://www.youtube.com/watch?v=tmPTjFT3eGw

== Sources ==
History of town and villages around Ternopil Ternopilszczyna._Istorija
