= Hushchanky =

Rural locality in Ternopil Oblast, Ukraine

Hushchanky Гущанки
- Location in Ternopil Oblast
- Coordinates: 49°38′14″N 25°58′33″E
- Country: Ukraine
- Oblast: Ternopil Oblast
- Raion: Ternopil Raion
- Hromada: Skoryky rural hromada
- Time zone: UTC+2 (EET)
  - Summer (DST): UTC+3 (EEST)
- Postal code: 47812

Hushchanky (Ukrainian: Гущанки) is a village in Skoryky rural hromada, Ternopil Raion, Ternopil Oblast, Ukraine.

== History ==
The first written mention of the village was in 1463.

After the liquidation of the Pidvolochysk Raion on 19 July 2020, the village became part of the Ternopil Raion.

== Religion ==
- St. Michael church (1810).

== Sources ==
- (in Ukrainian) Мельничук Б., Уніят В., Гущанки // Ternopil Encyclopedic Dictionary: in 4 v. / editorial board: H. Yavorskyi and other, Ternopil: "Zbruch", 2004, V. 1: А—Й, 696 s. — ISBN 966-528-197-6.
- "Huszczanki". Geographical Dictionary of the Kingdom of Poland (in Polish). 3. Warszawa: Kasa im. Józefa Mianowskiego. 1882. p. 228.
- "Huszczanki". Geographical Dictionary of the Kingdom of Poland (in Polish). p. 603.
