= Orikhovets, Ternopil Oblast =

Rural locality in Ternopil Oblast, Ukraine

Orikhovets Оріховець
- Location in Ternopil Oblast
- Coordinates: 49°28′13″N 26°10′38″E
- Country: Ukraine
- Oblast: Ternopil Oblast
- Raion: Ternopil Raion
- Hromada: Pidvolochysk settlement hromada
- Time zone: UTC+2 (EET)
  - Summer (DST): UTC+3 (EEST)
- Postal code: 47853

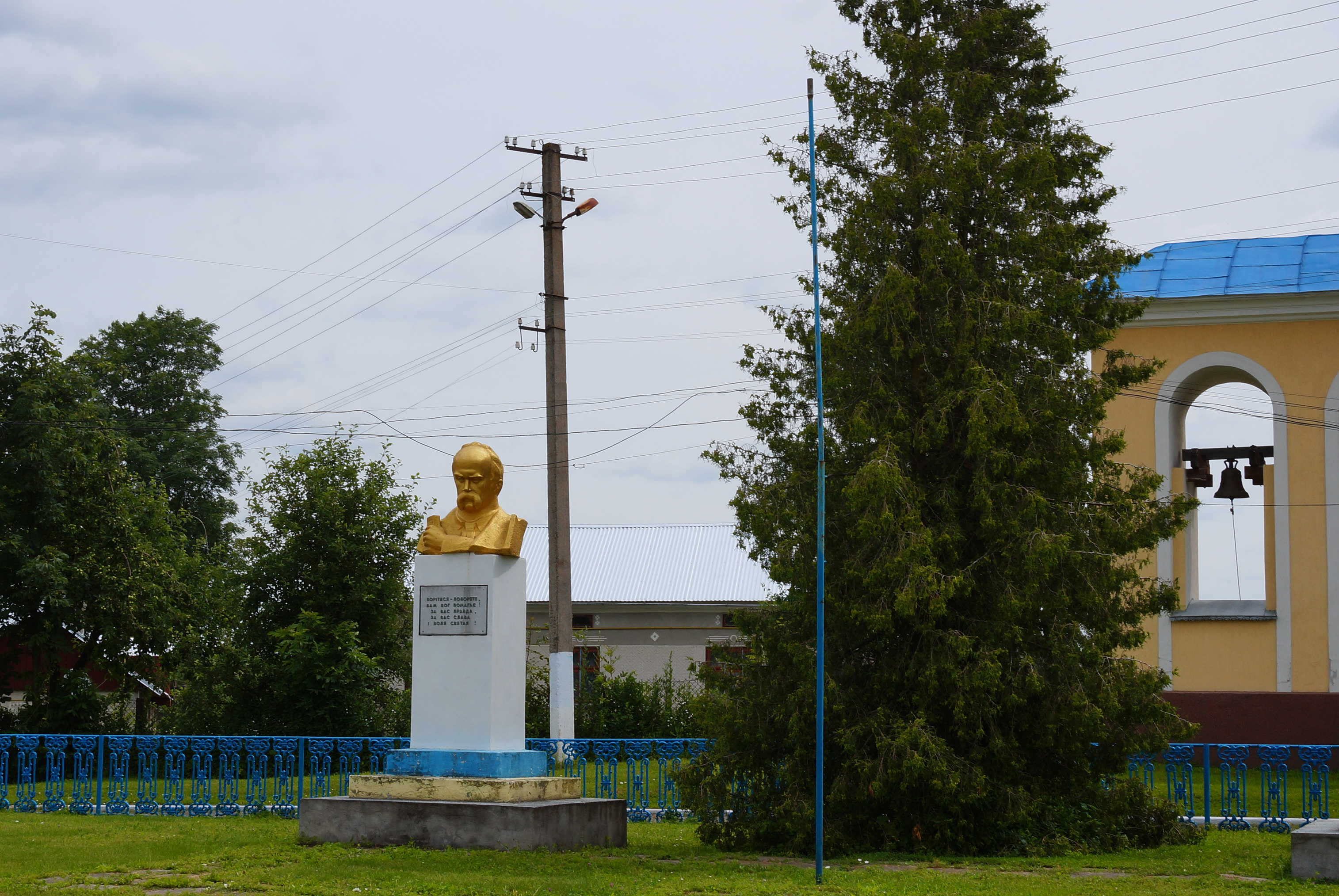
Shevchenko monument, Orikhovets

Orikhovets (Ukrainian: Оріховець) is a village in Pidvolochysk settlement hromada, Ternopil Raion, Ternopil Oblast, Ukraine.

== History ==
The first written mention of the village was in 1564.

After the liquidation of the Pidvolochysk Raion on 19 July 2020, the village became part of the Ternopil Raion.

== Religion ==
- Church of the Intercession (1901, brick; consecrated by Andrei Sheptytskyi, UGCC).

== Sources ==
- (in Ukrainian) Бігус М., Бойчук О., Оріховець // Ternopil Encyclopedic Dictionary: in 4 v. / editorial board: H. Yavorskyi and other, Ternopil: "Zbruch", 2005, V. 2: К—О, S. 685. — ISBN 966-528-199-2.
- "Orzechowice, al. Orzechowce i Orzechowiec, z Czerniszówką, wś, pow. skałacki". Geographical Dictionary of the Kingdom of Poland (in Polish). 7. Warszawa: Kasa im. Józefa Mianowskiego. 1886. p. 609.
