= Koshliaky, Ternopil Oblast =

Rural locality in Ternopil Oblast, Ukraine

Koshliaky Кошляки
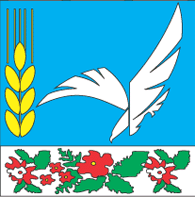
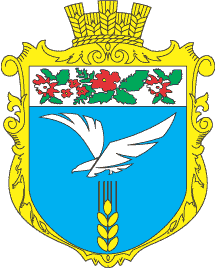
- Flag Coat of arms

- Location in Ternopil Oblast
- Coordinates: 49°40′35″N 26°08′48″E
- Country: Ukraine
- Oblast: Ternopil Oblast
- Raion: Ternopil Raion
- Hromada: Skoryky rural hromada
- Time zone: UTC+2 (EET)
  - Summer (DST): UTC+3 (EEST)
- Postal code: 47822

Koshliaky (Ukrainian: Кошляки) is a village in Skoryky rural hromada, Ternopil Raion, Ternopil Oblast, Ukraine.

== History ==
The first written mention of the village was in 1557.

After the liquidation of the Pidvolochysk Raion on 19 July 2020, the village became part of the Ternopil Raion.

== Religion ==
- Saint Paraskeva church (1939; built of stone, completed in 1995).

== Sources ==
- (in Ukrainian) Года Р., Уніят В., Кошляки // Ternopil Encyclopedic Dictionary: in 4 v. / editorial board: H. Yavorskyi and other, Ternopil: "Zbruch", 2005, V. 2: К—О, S. 211. — ISBN 966-528-199-2.
- Нечипорук О. Нарис про село Кошляки. — Тернопіль, 2002.
- "Koszlaki, wś, pow. zbaraski". Geographical Dictionary of the Kingdom of Poland (in Polish). 4. Warszawa: Kasa im. Józefa Mianowskiego. 1883. p. 485.
