= Hnylychky =

Rural locality in Ternopil Oblast, Ukraine

Hnylychky Гнилички
- Location in Ternopil Oblast
- Coordinates: 49°39′54″N 26°5′53″E
- Country: Ukraine
- Oblast: Ternopil Oblast
- Raion: Ternopil Raion
- Hromada: Skoryky rural hromada
- Time zone: UTC+2 (EET)
  - Summer (DST): UTC+3 (EEST)
- Postal code: 47811

Hnylychky (Ukrainian: Гнилички) is a village in Skoryky rural hromada, Ternopil Raion, Ternopil Oblast, Ukraine.

== History ==
The first written mention of the village was in 1583.

After the liquidation of the Pidvolochysk Raion on 19 July 2020, the village became part of the Ternopil Raion.

== Religion ==
- Two churches of St. John the Theologian (1886, OCU; 2004, UGCC).

== Sources ==
- (in Ukrainian) Уніят В., Пелехатий Я., Гнилички // Ternopil Encyclopedic Dictionary: in 4 v. / editorial board: H. Yavorskyi and other, Ternopil: "Zbruch", 2004, V. 1: А—Й, S. 370. — ISBN 966-528-197-6.
- "o wsi w h. Toki (2)". Geographical Dictionary of the Kingdom of Poland (in Polish). 12. Warszawa: Kasa im. Józefa Mianowskiego. 1892. p. 362.
- "Hnilice Małe". Geographical Dictionary of the Kingdom of Poland (in Polish). 3. Warszawa: Kasa im. Józefa Mianowskiego. 1882. p. 82.
