= Obodivka, Ternopil Oblast =

Rural locality in Ternopil Oblast, Ukraine

Obodivka Ободівка
- Location in Ternopil Oblast
- Coordinates: 49°37′48″N 26°01′22″E
- Country: Ukraine
- Oblast: Ternopil Oblast
- Raion: Ternopil Raion
- Hromada: Skoryky rural hromada
- Time zone: UTC+2 (EET)
  - Summer (DST): UTC+3 (EEST)
- Postal code: 47812

Obodivka (Ukrainian: Ободівка) is a village in Skoryky rural hromada, Ternopil Raion, Ternopil Oblast, Ukraine.

== History ==
The first written mention of the village was in 1544.

After the liquidation of the Pidvolochysk Raion on 19 July 2020, the village became part of the Ternopil Raion.

== Religion ==
There is a figure (restored, 1990).

== Sources ==
- (in Ukrainian) Готович Л., Уніят В., Ободівка // Ternopil Encyclopedic Dictionary: in 4 v. / editorial board: H. Yavorskyi and other, Ternopil: "Zbruch", 2005, V. 2: К—О, S. 651. — ISBN 966-528-199-2.
- "Obodówka, powiat zbaraski". Geographical Dictionary of the Kingdom of Poland (in Polish). 7. Warszawa: Kasa im. Józefa Mianowskiego. 1886. p. 334.
