= Staromishchyna =

Rural locality in Ternopil Oblast, Ukraine

Staromishchyna Староміщина
- Village
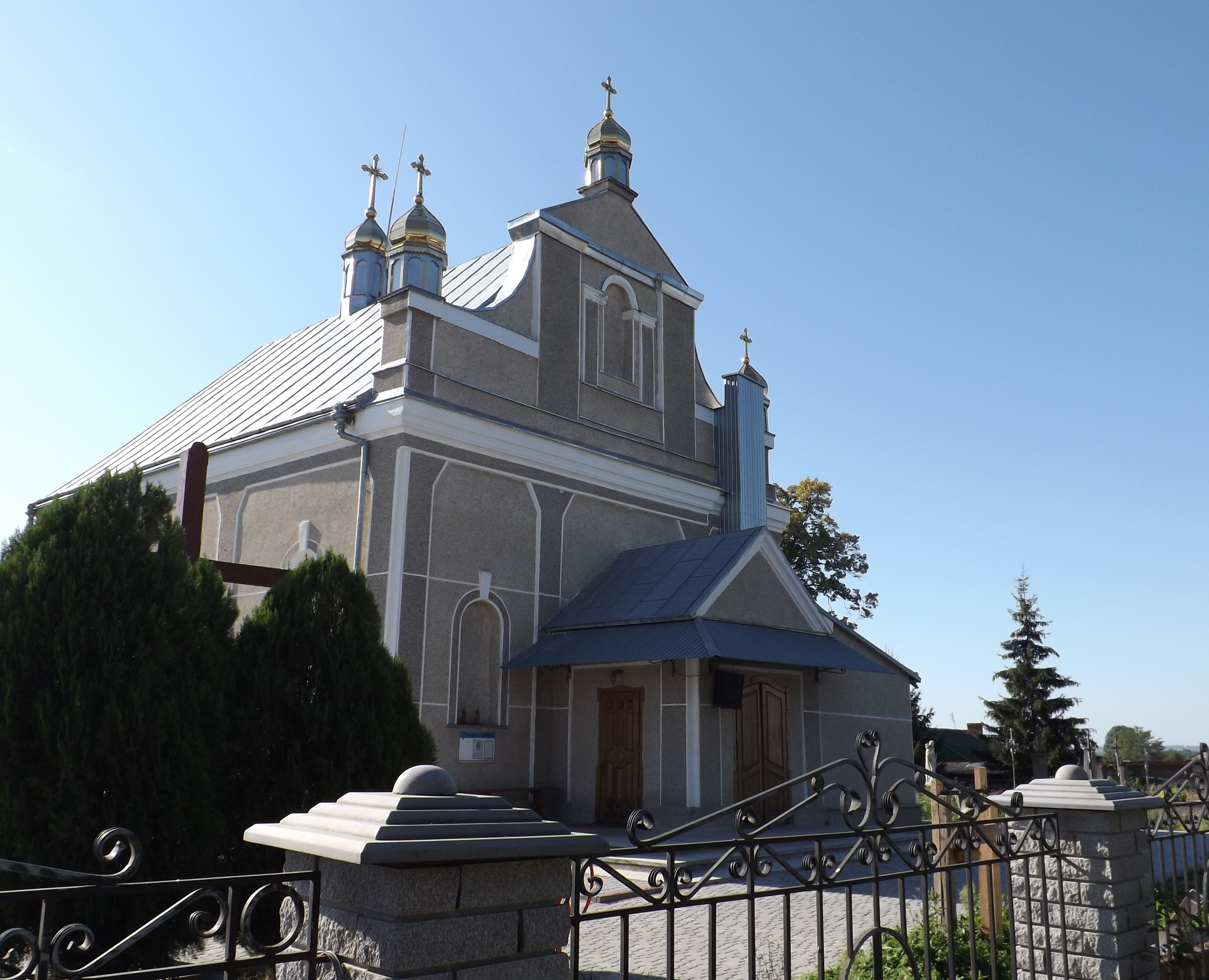
- Church of Saint Nicholas

- Location within Ukraine Location within Ternopil Oblast
- Coordinates: 49°32′51″N 26°09′28″E
- Country: Ukraine
- Oblast: Ternopil Oblast
- Raion: Ternopil Raion
- Established: 1599

Population (2007)
  - Total: 829

Staromishchyna (Ukrainian: Староміщина, Polish: Staromiejszczyzna) is a village in Ternopil Raion of Ternopil Oblast in western Ukraine. It belongs to Pidvolochysk settlement hromada, one of the hromadas of Ukraine. As of 2007 the population consisted of 829 people.

Until 18 July 2020, Staromishchyna belonged to Pidvolochysk Raion. The raion was abolished in July 2020 as part of the administrative reform of Ukraine, which reduced the number of raions of Ternopil Oblast to three. The area of Pidvolochysk Raion was merged into Ternopil Raion.
