= Korshylivka =

Rural locality in Ternopil Oblast, Ukraine

Korshylivka Коршилівка
- Location in Ternopil Oblast
- Coordinates: 49°34′13″N 26°3′48″E
- Country: Ukraine
- Oblast: Ternopil Oblast
- Raion: Ternopil Raion
- Hromada: Pidvolochysk settlement hromada
- Time zone: UTC+2 (EET)
  - Summer (DST): UTC+3 (EEST)
- Postal code: 47831

Korshylivka (Ukrainian: Коршилівка) is a village in Pidvolochysk settlement hromada, Ternopil Raion, Ternopil Oblast, Ukraine.

== History ==
The village has been known from the 18th century.

After the liquidation of the Pidvolochysk Raion on 19 July 2020, the village became part of the Ternopil Raion.

== Religion ==
- Saint Demetrius church (1901, brick; with a stele with the names of the villagers who died in 1914-1921 for the freedom of Ukraine).

== Sources ==
- (in Ukrainian) Уніят В., Коршилівка // Ternopil Encyclopedic Dictionary: in 4 v. / editorial board: H. Yavorskyi and other, Ternopil: "Zbruch", 2005, V. 2: К—О, S. 188. — ISBN 966-528-199-2.
- "Korszyłówka". Geographical Dictionary of the Kingdom of Poland (in Polish). 4. Warszawa: Kasa im. Józefa Mianowskiego. 1883. p. 424.
- "Korszyłówka". Geographical Dictionary of the Kingdom of Poland (in Polish). p. 129.
