= Ivanivka, Pidvolochysk settlement hromada, Ternopil Raion, Ternopil Oblast =

Rural locality in Ternopil Oblast, Ukraine

Ivanivka Іванівка
- Location in Ternopil Oblast
- Coordinates: 49°26′11″N 26°8′38″E
- Country: Ukraine
- Oblast: Ternopil Oblast
- Raion: Ternopil Raion
- Hromada: Pidvolochysk settlement hromada
- Time zone: UTC+2 (EET)
  - Summer (DST): UTC+3 (EEST)
- Postal code: 47855

Ivanivka (Ukrainian: Іванівка) is a village in Pidvolochysk settlement hromada, Ternopil Raion, Ternopil Oblast, Ukraine.

== History ==
The first written mention of the village was in 1559.

After the liquidation of the Pidvolochysk Raion on 19 July 2020, the village became part of the Ternopil Raion.

== Religion ==
- St. John the Baptist church (1827; brick; UGCC),
- St. George church (2001; brick; OCU),
- St. Stanislav church (1914, not functioning, RCC).

== Sources ==
- (in Ukrainian) Тхорик Я., Іванівка // Ternopil Encyclopedic Dictionary: in 4 v. / editorial board: H. Yavorskyi and other, Ternopil: "Zbruch", 2004, V. 1: А—Й, S. 666. — ISBN 966-528-197-6.
- "Iwanówka (po rusku Iwaniwka) 1) wś w pow. skałackim". Geographical Dictionary of the Kingdom of Poland (in Polish). 3. Warszawa: Kasa im. Józefa Mianowskiego. 1882. p. 320.
