= Kamianky, Ternopil Oblast =

Rural locality in Ternopil Oblast, Ukraine

Kamianky Кам'янки
- Location in Ternopil Oblast
- Coordinates: 49°32′37″N 26°1′32″E
- Country: Ukraine
- Oblast: Ternopil Oblast
- Raion: Ternopil Raion
- Hromada: Pidvolochysk settlement hromada
- Time zone: UTC+2 (EET)
  - Summer (DST): UTC+3 (EEST)
- Postal code: 47840

Kamianky (Ukrainian: Кам'янки) is a village in Pidvolochysk settlement hromada, Ternopil Raion, Ternopil Oblast, Ukraine.

== History ==
The first written mention of the village was in 1541.

After the liquidation of the Pidvolochysk Raion on 19 July 2020, the village became part of the Ternopil Raion.

== Religion ==
- St. Nicholas church (1846, brick, OCU),
- St. Michael chapel (2000, UGCC).

== Notable residents ==
Yaroslav Stetsko, a politician, ideologist of Ukrainian nationalism and publicist, lived in the village. The poet Dmytro Pavlychko, political and public figures Leonid Kuchma, Oleksandr Moroz, and Viktor Yushchenko also visited the village.

== Sources ==
- (in Ukrainian) Клименко О., Мельничук Б., Кам'янки // Ternopil Encyclopedic Dictionary: in 4 v. / editorial board: H. Yavorskyi and other, Ternopil: "Zbruch", 2005, V. 2: К—О, S. 24–25. — ISBN 966-528-199-2.
