= Shelpaky =

Village in Ternopil Oblast, Ukraine

Shelpaky Шельпаки
- Location in Ternopil Oblast
- Coordinates: 49°39′53″N 26°01′23″E
- Country: Ukraine
- Oblast: Ternopil Oblast
- Raion: Ternopil Raion
- Hromada: Skoryky Hromada
- Postal code: 47810

Shelpaky (Ukrainian: Шельпаки) is a village in Skoryky rural hromada, Ternopil Raion, Ternopil Oblast, Ukraine.

== History ==
The first written mention is from 1463.

After the liquidation of the Pidvolochysk Raion on 19 July 2020, the village became part of the Ternopil Raion.

== Religion ==
- Saint George Church (1783, brick)

== Famous people ==
- Nadiia Morykvas (born 1952), Ukrainian writer, essayist, literary critic

== Sources ==
- "Szelpaki". Geographical Dictionary of the Kingdom of Poland (in Polish). 11. Warszawa: Kasa im. Józefa Mianowskiego. 1890. p. 891.
