= Lysychyntsi =

Rural locality in Ternopil Oblast, Ukraine

Lysychyntsi Лисичинці
- Location in Ternopil Oblast
- Coordinates: 49°40′53″N 26°0′39″E
- Country: Ukraine
- Oblast: Ternopil Oblast
- Raion: Ternopil Raion
- Hromada: Skoryky rural hromada
- Time zone: UTC+2 (EET)
  - Summer (DST): UTC+3 (EEST)
- Postal code: 47810

Lysychyntsi (Ukrainian: Лисичинці) is a village in Skoryky rural hromada, Ternopil Raion, Ternopil Oblast, Ukraine.

== History ==
The first written mention of the village was in 1629.

After the liquidation of the Pidvolochysk Raion on 19 July 2020, the village became part of the Ternopil Raion.

== Religion ==
- Saint Basil the Great church (1903, built of stone, architect Vasyl Nahirnyi).

== Sources ==
- (in Ukrainian) Бігус М., Мельничук Б., Лисичинці // Ternopil Encyclopedic Dictionary: in 4 v. / editorial board: H. Yavorskyi and other, Ternopil: "Zbruch", 2005, V. 2: К—О, S. 361. — ISBN 966-528-199-2.
