= Rozhysk =

Rural locality in Ternopil Oblast, Ukraine

Rozhysk Рожиськ
- Location in Ternopil Oblast
- Coordinates: 49°25′29″N 26°11′31″E
- Country: Ukraine
- Oblast: Ternopil Oblast
- Raion: Ternopil Raion
- Hromada: Pidvolochysk settlement hromada
- Time zone: UTC+2 (EET)
  - Summer (DST): UTC+3 (EEST)
- Postal code: 47853

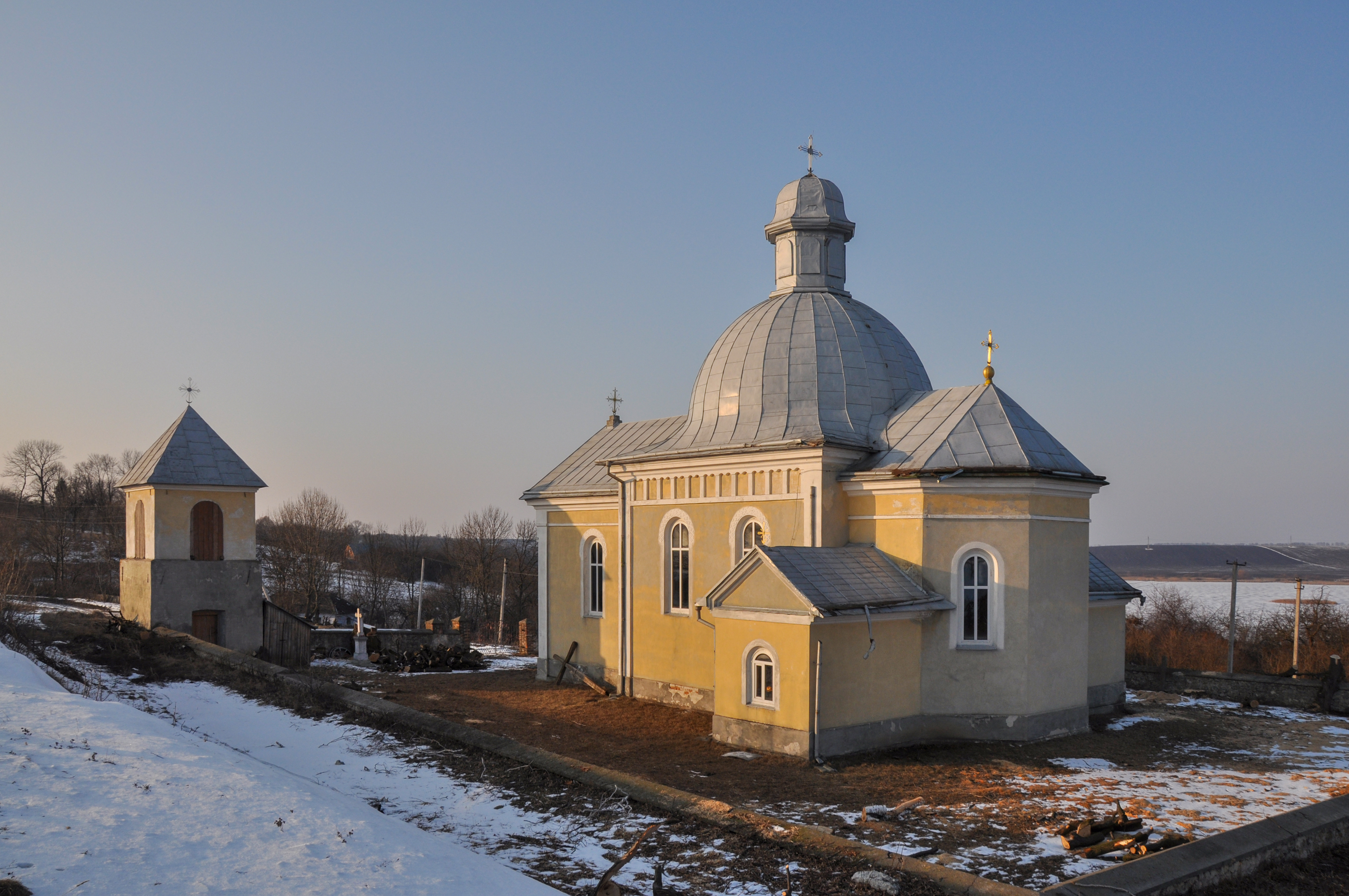
Saint Michael church, Rozhysk, Ukraine

Rozhysk (Ukrainian: Рожиськ) is a village in the Pidvolochysk settlement hromada, Ternopil Raion, Ternopil Oblast, Ukraine.

== History ==
The first written mention of the village was in 1457.

After the liquidation of the Pidvolochysk Raion on 19 July 2020, the village became part of the Ternopil Raion.

== Religion ==
- St. Michael church (1882, brick).

== Sources ==
- (in Ukrainian) Гуцал П., Патрило О., Рожиськ // Ternopil Encyclopedic Dictionary: in 4 v. / editorial board: H. Yavorskyi and other, Ternopil: "Zbruch", 2008, V. 3: П—Я, S. 187. — ISBN 978-966-528-279-2.
- "o wsi w h. Iwanówka, wś. w pow. skałackim". Geographical Dictionary of the Kingdom of Poland (in Polish). 3. Warszawa: Kasa im. Józefa Mianowskiego. 1882. p. 320.
- "Rożyska". Geographical Dictionary of the Kingdom of Poland (in Polish). 9. Warszawa: Kasa im. Józefa Mianowskiego. 1888. p. 875.
