= Klebanivka =

Rural locality in Ternopil Oblast, Ukraine

Klebanivka Клебанівка
- Location in Ternopil Oblast
- Coordinates: 49°34′57″N 26°1′27″E
- Country: Ukraine
- Oblast: Ternopil Oblast
- Raion: Ternopil Raion
- Hromada: Pidvolochysk settlement hromada
- Time zone: UTC+2 (EET)
  - Summer (DST): UTC+3 (EEST)
- Postal code: 47830

Klebanivka (Ukrainian: Клебанівка) is a village in Pidvolochysk settlement hromada, Ternopil Raion, Ternopil Oblast, Ukraine.

== History ==
The first written mention of the village was in 1463.

After the liquidation of the Pidvolochysk Raion on 19 July 2020, the village became part of the Ternopil Raion.

== Religion ==
- Church of the Intercession (1898, brick, UGCC).

== Notable residents ==
In the village visited Ivan Franko, religious and educational activist Yosyp Sembratovych, religious activist Nykyta Budka, lawyer, public and political activist Sydir Holubovych.

== Sources ==
- (in Ukrainian) Уніят В., Клебанівка // Ternopil Encyclopedic Dictionary: in 4 v. / editorial board: H. Yavorskyi and other, Ternopil: "Zbruch", 2005, V. 2: К—О, S. 1. — ISBN 966-528-199-2.
- "Klebanówka". Geographical Dictionary of the Kingdom of Poland (in Polish). 4. Warszawa: Kasa im. Józefa Mianowskiego. 1883. p. 121.
