= Bohdanivka, Pidvolochysk settlement hromada, Ternopil Raion, Ternopil Oblast =

Rural locality in Ternopil Oblast, Ukraine

Bohdanivka Богданівка
- Location in Ternopil Oblast
- Coordinates: 49°33′20″N 25°59′20″E
- Country: Ukraine
- Oblast: Ternopil Oblast
- Raion: Ternopil Raion
- Hromada: Pidvolochysk settlement hromada
- Time zone: UTC+2 (EET)
  - Summer (DST): UTC+3 (EEST)
- Postal code: 47832

Bohdanivka (Ukrainian: Богданівка) is a village in Pidvolochysk settlement hromada, Ternopil Raion, Ternopil Oblast, Ukraine.

== History ==
The first written mention of the village was in 1583.

After the liquidation of the Pidvolochysk Raion on 19 July 2020, the village became part of the Ternopil Raion.

== Religion ==
- St. Nicholas church (1896; restored in 1909).

== Notable residents ==
A doctor of chemical sciences, professor emeritus of Lviv University Mykhailo Soltys lived and studied in the village; poet and literary critic Yevhen Sverstiuk worked as a teacher.

In 1898 the village was visited by the historian and statesman Mykhailo Hrushevskyi (in the early 1890s his wife Maria-Ivanna and daughter Kateryna stayed there). The writer Borys Antonenko-Davydovych also visited the village.

== Sources ==
- (in Ukrainian) Бойчук О., Лашта В., Богданівка // Ternopil Encyclopedic Dictionary: in 4 v. / editorial board: H. Yavorskyi and other, Ternopil: "Zbruch", 2004, V. 1: А—Й, S. 149. — ISBN 966-528-197-6.
- "Bogdanówka". Geographical Dictionary of the Kingdom of Poland (in Polish). 1. Warszawa: Kasa im. Józefa Mianowskiego. 1880. p. 277.
