= Klymkivtsi, Ternopil Oblast =

Rural locality in Ternopil Oblast, Ukraine

Klimkivtsi Климківці
- Village
- Interactive map of Klimkivtsi
- Coordinates: 49°36′20″N 26°6′5″E
- Country: Ukraine
- Oblast: Ternopil Oblast
- Raion: Ternopil Raion

Population
  - Total: 290

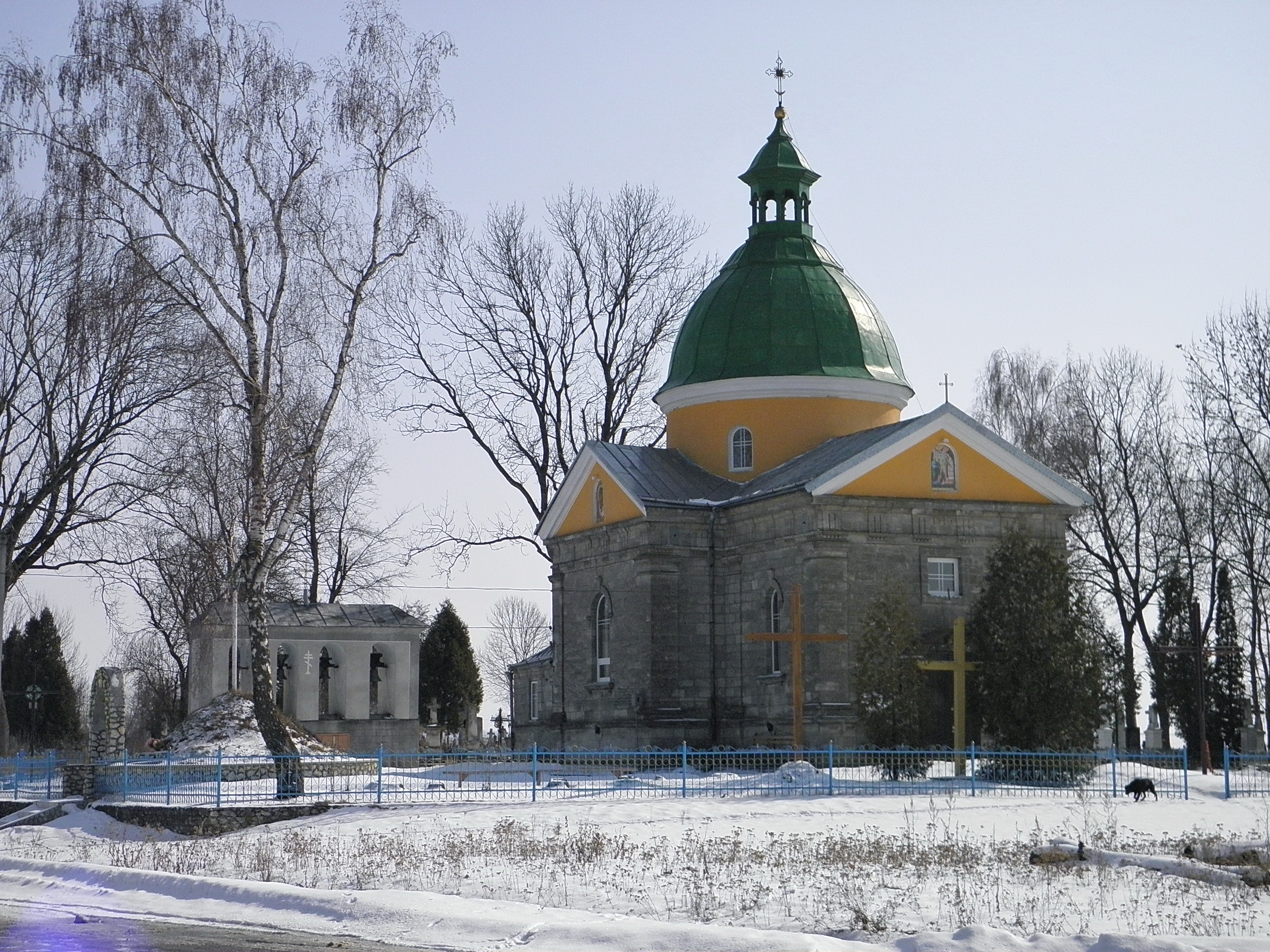

Klymkivtsi is a village in Ternopil Raion of Ternopil Oblast of Ukraine. It belongs to Skoryky rural hromada, one of the hromadas of Ukraine. Its population is about 290 people.

Until 18 July 2020, Klymkivtsi belonged to Pidvolochysk Raion. The raion was abolished in July 2020 as part of the administrative reform of Ukraine, which reduced the number of raions of Ternopil Oblast to three. The area of Pidvolochysk Raion was merged into Ternopil Raion.
