= Toky =

Rural locality in Ternopil Oblast, Ukraine

Toky Токи
- Village
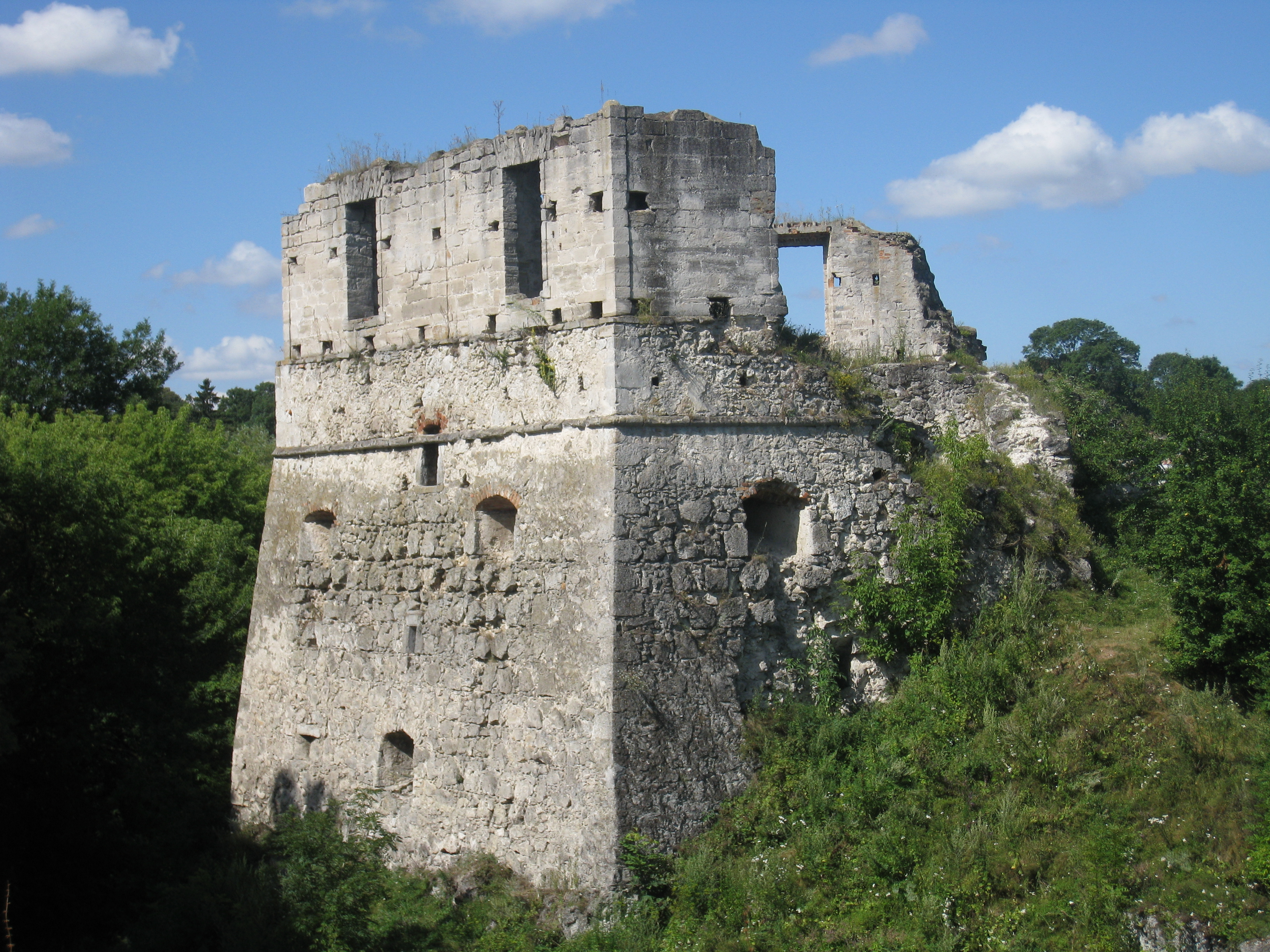
- Toky Castle

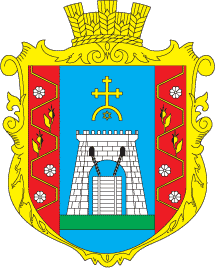
- Coat of arms
- Coordinates: 49°37′59″N 26°13′23″E
- Country: Ukraine
- Oblast: Ternopil Oblast
- Raion: Ternopil Raion
- Hromada: Skoryky rural hromada
- Established: 1772

Area
  - Total: 5.509 km^{2} (2.127 sq mi)

Population
  - Total: 1,172
  - Density: 216.74/km^{2} (561.4/sq mi)
- Postal code: 47823
- Telephone number: +380 3543

Toky (Ukrainian: Токи́) is a village in the valley of the Zbruch River in Ternopil Raion, Ternopil Oblast in western Ukraine. It belongs to Skoryky rural hromada, one of the hromadas of Ukraine.

== History ==
There are ruins that date back to the time of Kievan Rus' but the first written record of the village is not until 30 March 1430. The castle was built in the late 16th century by Janusz Zbaraski (1553-1608), voivode of Bracław and according to legend Jeremi Wiśniowiecki, "Hammer of the Cossacks" spent his childhood there.

The river made a natural border between the Habsburg Empire and Poland, the village began the 20th century under Habsburg control but then became part of Poland. There was a Polish Catholic Church but it was demolished in Soviet times. The sizeable Jewish population was lost in the Holocaust.

Until 18 July 2020, Toky belonged to Pidvolochysk Raion. The raion was abolished in July 2020 as part of the administrative reform of Ukraine, which reduced the number of raions of Ternopil Oblast to three. The area of Pidvolochysk Raion was merged into Ternopil Raion.

== Notable people ==
- Zenovii Flinta (1935–1988), Ukrainian ceramic artist, painter, graphic artist
- Antin Maliutsa (1908–1970), Ukrainian graphic artist, painter, art historian, bandura player
- Władysław Rubin (1917–1990), Roman Catholic cardinal was born and spent his childhood in the village
