= Prosivtsi =

Rural locality in Ternopil Oblast, Ukraine

Prosivtsi Просівці
- Location in Ternopil Oblast
- Coordinates: 49°35′47″N 26°12′08″E
- Country: Ukraine
- Oblast: Ternopil Oblast
- Raion: Ternopil Raion
- Hromada: Skoryky rural hromada
- Time zone: UTC+2 (EET)
  - Summer (DST): UTC+3 (EEST)
- Postal code: 47814

Prosivtsi (Ukrainian: Просівці) is a village in Skoryky rural hromada, Ternopil Raion, Ternopil Oblast, Ukraine.

== History ==
The first written mention of the village was in 1503.

After the liquidation of the Pidvolochysk Raion on 19 July 2020, the village became part of the Ternopil Raion.

== Religion ==
- Saint John the Baptist church (1909, stone),
- Roman Catholic Church (1910, not functioning).

== Sources ==
- "Prosowce". Geographical Dictionary of the Kingdom of Poland (in Polish). 9. Warszawa: Kasa im. Józefa Mianowskiego. 1888. p. 62.
