= Nove Selo, Ternopil Oblast =

Rural locality in Ternopil Oblast, Ukraine

Nove Selo Нове Село
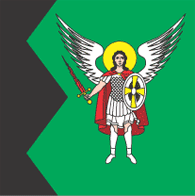
- Flag Coat of arms

- Location in Ternopil Oblast
- Coordinates: 49°39′36″N 26°3′26″E
- Country: Ukraine
- Oblast: Ternopil Oblast
- Raion: Ternopil Raion
- Hromada: Skoryky rural hromada
- Time zone: UTC+2 (EET)
  - Summer (DST): UTC+3 (EEST)
- Postal code: 47811

Nove Selo (Ukrainian: Нове Село) is a village in Skoryky rural hromada, Ternopil Raion, Ternopil Oblast, Ukraine.

== History ==
The first written mention of the village was in 1463.

After the liquidation of the Pidvolochysk Raion on 19 July 2020, the village became part of the Ternopil Raion.

== Religion ==
- Two churches of St. Michael (1790; 2010).

== Sources ==
- Гловінський Р. Я. Нове Село // Енциклопедія Сучасної України [Електронний ресурс] / Редкол. : І. М. Дзюба, А. І. Жуковський, М. Г. Железняк [та ін.]; НАН України, НТШ. – К. : Інститут енциклопедичних досліджень НАН України, 2021.
- (in Ukrainian) Гудима А., Нове Село // Ternopil Encyclopedic Dictionary: in 4 v. / editorial board: H. Yavorskyi and other, Ternopil: "Zbruch", 2005, V. 2: К—О, S. 638. — ISBN 966-528-199-2.
- "Nowesioło 2.) N., wś, pow. zbaraski". Geographical Dictionary of the Kingdom of Poland (in Polish). 7. Warszawa: Kasa im. Józefa Mianowskiego. 1886. p. 233.
