= Antin Maliutsa =

Ukrainian painter (1908–1970)

- Антін Іванович Малюца
- Born: 2 February 1908; Toky, Austria-Hungary (now Ukraine)
- Died: 17 June 1970 (aged 62); New York City, U.S.
- Education: Ternopil Ukrainian Gymnasium, Oleksa Novakivskyi Art School, Lviv Institute of Plastic Arts
- Occupations: Graphic artist, painter, art historian, bandura player.

Antin Maliutsa (Ukrainian: Антін Іванович Малюца; 2 February 1908 – 17 June 1970) was a Ukrainian graphic artist, painter, art historian, bandura player. Brother of Stepan Maliutsa-Palchynetskyi. He was a member of the Ukrainian Artist's Association in USA and the Literary and Art Club in New York.

== Biography ==
Antin Maliutsa was born on 2 February 1908 in Toky, now Ternopil Oblast.

In 1926, he graduated from the Ternopil Ukrainian Gymnasium, in 1930 from the Oleksa Novakivskyi Art School, and until 1935 he attended Ludwik Tyrowicz graphic arts courses, and in 1939 he graduated from the Lviv Institute of Plastic Arts.

He co-founded the "RUB" art group and its magazine "Karby" in 1933–1939, and later worked on the decorations of the "Zahrava" and "Bohema" theaters.

In 1942–1944 he worked as a professor and deputy director of the Lviv Art and Industrial School. He performed at concerts together with his brother Stepan.

For some time, he lived in displaced persons' camps in Germany, where he was a member of the Surma Choir (directed by Omelan Pleszkewycz). In 1950, he emigrated to the United States, where he worked as a draughtsman for a textile factory in New York.

He died on 17 June 1970 in New York City. He is buried in Bound Brook, New Jersey, New Jersey, U.S.

== Works ==
Author of art history publications.

In 1922, he began to participate in exhibitions; personal exhibitions were held posthumously in New York (1972) and Ternopil (1998). He painted painted and watercolor landscapes, engravings and drawings, some of which are kept in the funds of the Ternopil Regional Art Museum.

Among the main works:

- painting "Selo Palchyntsi" (1927), "Vezhi. Lviv" (1930s.), "Tserkva sv. Mykolaia v Buchachi" (1943), "Karpatska panorama" (1944), "Nad zatokoiu", "Hirskyi kraievyd", "Tserkva v Hanteri", "Hirska dalechin", "Pislia buri", "Plyvut khmary", "Tserkovtsia", "Vodospad" (all – 1950–1969), "Kraievyd" (1956);
- mural design "Presviataia Bohorodytsia" (1930s);
- cycles of drawings "Strakhittia" (1947), "Mandrivka v temriavi" (1950s).
