= Tarnoruda, Ternopil Oblast =

Rural locality in Ternopil Oblast, Ukraine

Tarnoruda Тарноруда
- Location in Ternopil Oblast
- Coordinates: 49°24′24″N 26°13′3″E
- Country: Ukraine
- Oblast: Ternopil Oblast
- Raion: Ternopil Raion
- Hromada: Pidvolochysk settlement hromada
- Time zone: UTC+2 (EET)
  - Summer (DST): UTC+3 (EEST)
- Postal code: 47862

Tarnoruda (Ukrainian: Тарноруда) is a village in Pidvolochysk settlement hromada, Ternopil Raion, Ternopil Oblast, Ukraine.

== History ==
The first written mention of the village was in 1431.

After the liquidation of the Pidvolochysk Raion on 19 July 2020, the village became part of the Ternopil Raion.

== Religion ==
- Roman Catholic Church of St. Stanisław (1816, restored in 1938).

== Sources ==
- (in Ukrainian) Бігус М., Хаварівський Б., Тарноруда // Ternopil Encyclopedic Dictionary: in 4 v. / editorial board: H. Yavorskyi and other, Ternopil: "Zbruch", 2008, V. 3: П—Я, S. 386. — ISBN 978-966-528-279-2.
- "Tarnorudam mko, powiat skałacki". Geographical Dictionary of the Kingdom of Poland (in Polish). 12. Warszawa: Kasa im. Józefa Mianowskiego. 1892. p. 195—196.
