= Zherebky =

Rural locality in Ternopil Oblast, Ukraine

Zherebky Жеребки
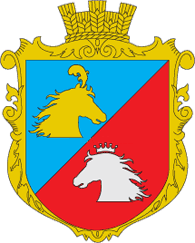
- Coat of arms

- Location in Ternopil Oblast
- Coordinates: 49°30′12″N 25°54′10″E
- Country: Ukraine
- Oblast: Ternopil Oblast
- Raion: Ternopil Raion
- Hromada: Pidvolochysk settlement hromada
- Time zone: UTC+2 (EET)
  - Summer (DST): UTC+3 (EEST)
- Postal code: 47843

Zherebky (Ukrainian: Жеребки) is a village in Pidvolochysk settlement hromada, Ternopil Raion, Ternopil Oblast, Ukraine.

== History ==
The first written mention of the village was in 1574.

After the liquidation of the Pidvolochysk Raion on 19 July 2020, the village became part of the Ternopil Raion.

== Religion ==
- Church of the Intercession (1912; brick, restored in 1990),
- Church of the Assumption (1930s; brick, completed in 1991),
- Saints Peter and Paul church (1936; brick, restored in 2000).

== In the literature ==
In 2003, Petro Hutsal's book "Selo Zherebky: yoho istoriia i liudy" was published.

== Sources ==
- (in Ukrainian) Гуцал П., Жеребки // Ternopil Encyclopedic Dictionary: in 4 v. / editorial board: H. Yavorskyi and other, Ternopil: "Zbruch", 2004, V. 1: А—Й, S. 572-573. — ISBN 966-528-197-6.
- "Żerebki 1.) Królewskie… pow. skałacki)". Geographical Dictionary of the Kingdom of Poland (in Polish). 14. Warszawa: Kasa im. Józefa Mianowskiego. 1895. p. 778.
- "Żerebki 2.) Ż. Szlacheckie (al. Małe), wś, pow. skałacki)". Geographical Dictionary of the Kingdom of Poland (in Polish). 14. Warszawa: Kasa im. Józefa Mianowskiego. 1895. p. 779.
