= Medyn, Ternopil Oblast =

Rural locality in Ternopil Oblast, Ukraine

Medyn Медин
- Location in Ternopil Oblast
- Coordinates: 49°36′40″N 26°08′42″E
- Country: Ukraine
- Oblast: Ternopil Oblast
- Raion: Ternopil Raion
- Hromada: Skoryky rural hromada
- Time zone: UTC+2 (EET)
  - Summer (DST): UTC+3 (EEST)
- Postal code: 47814

Medyn (Ukrainian: Медин) is a village in Skoryky rural hromada, Ternopil Raion, Ternopil Oblast, Ukraine.

== History ==
The first written mention of the village was in 1463.

After the liquidation of the Pidvolochysk Raion on 19 July 2020, the village became part of the Ternopil Raion.

== Religion ==
- Church of the Intercession (1862, wooden, OCU),
- UGCC chapel (1998),
- remains of a Roman Catholic church (1867).

== Sources ==
- (in Ukrainian) Мельничук Б., Уніят В., Медин // Ternopil Encyclopedic Dictionary: in 4 v. / editorial board: H. Yavorskyi and other, Ternopil: "Zbruch", 2005, V. 2: К—О, S. 487. — ISBN 966-528-199-2.
- "Medyń". Geographical Dictionary of the Kingdom of Poland (in Polish). 6. Warszawa: Kasa im. Józefa Mianowskiego. 1885. p. 239—240.
