= Dorofiivka, Ternopil Oblast =

Rural locality in Ternopil Oblast, Ukraine

Dorofiivka Дорофіївка
- Location in Ternopil Oblast
- Coordinates: 49°33′21.2″N 26°12′22.0″E
- Country: Ukraine
- Oblast: Ternopil Oblast
- Raion: Ternopil Raion
- Hromada: Pidvolochysk settlement hromada
- Time zone: UTC+2 (EET)
  - Summer (DST): UTC+3 (EEST)
- Postal code: 47805

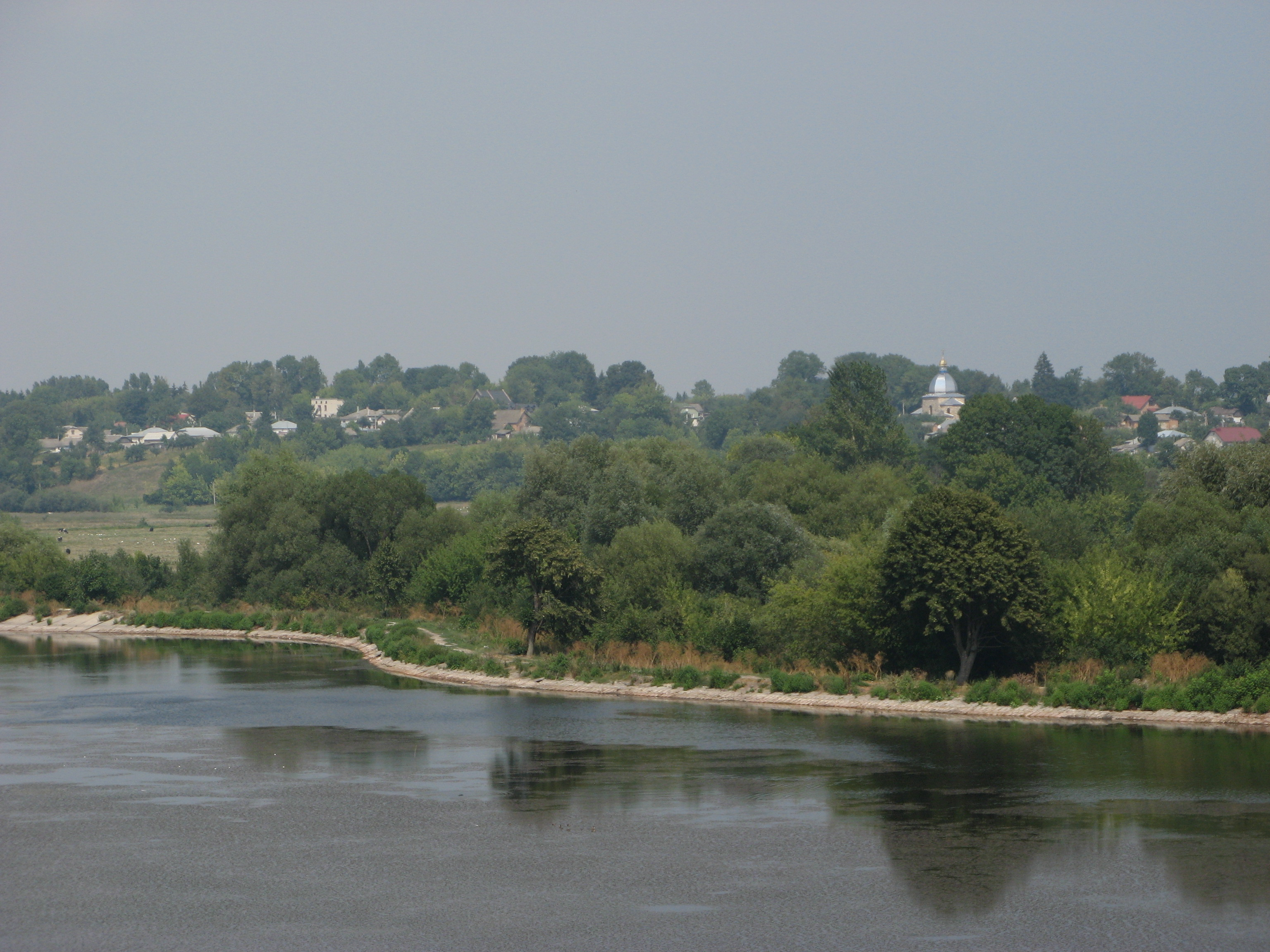
Dorofiivka

Dorofiivka (Ukrainian: Дорофіївка) is a village in Pidvolochysk settlement hromada, Ternopil Raion, Ternopil Oblast, Ukraine.

== History ==
The first written mention of the village was in 1549.

After the liquidation of the Pidvolochysk Raion on 19 July 2020, the village became part of the Ternopil Raion.

== Religion ==
- Saint Paraskeva church (1938, brick),
- Roman Catholic chapel (1877, wooden).

== Sources ==
- "Doroflówka". Geographical Dictionary of the Kingdom of Poland (in Polish). 2. Warszawa: Kasa im. Józefa Mianowskiego. 1881. p. 123.
