= Fashchivka =

Fashchivka (Ukrainian: Фащівка) may refer to the following places in Ukraine:

- Fashchivka, Alchevsk Raion, Luhansk Oblast
- Fashchivka, Rovenky Raion, Luhansk Oblast
- Fashchivka, Ternopil Oblast
