= Khmelyska =

Rural locality in Ternopil Oblast, Ukraine

Khmelyska Хмелиська
- Location in Ternopil Oblast
- Coordinates: 49°30′40″N 25°59′32″E
- Country: Ukraine
- Oblast: Ternopil Oblast
- Raion: Ternopil Raion
- Hromada: Pidvolochysk settlement hromada
- Time zone: UTC+2 (EET)
  - Summer (DST): UTC+3 (EEST)
- Postal code: 47842

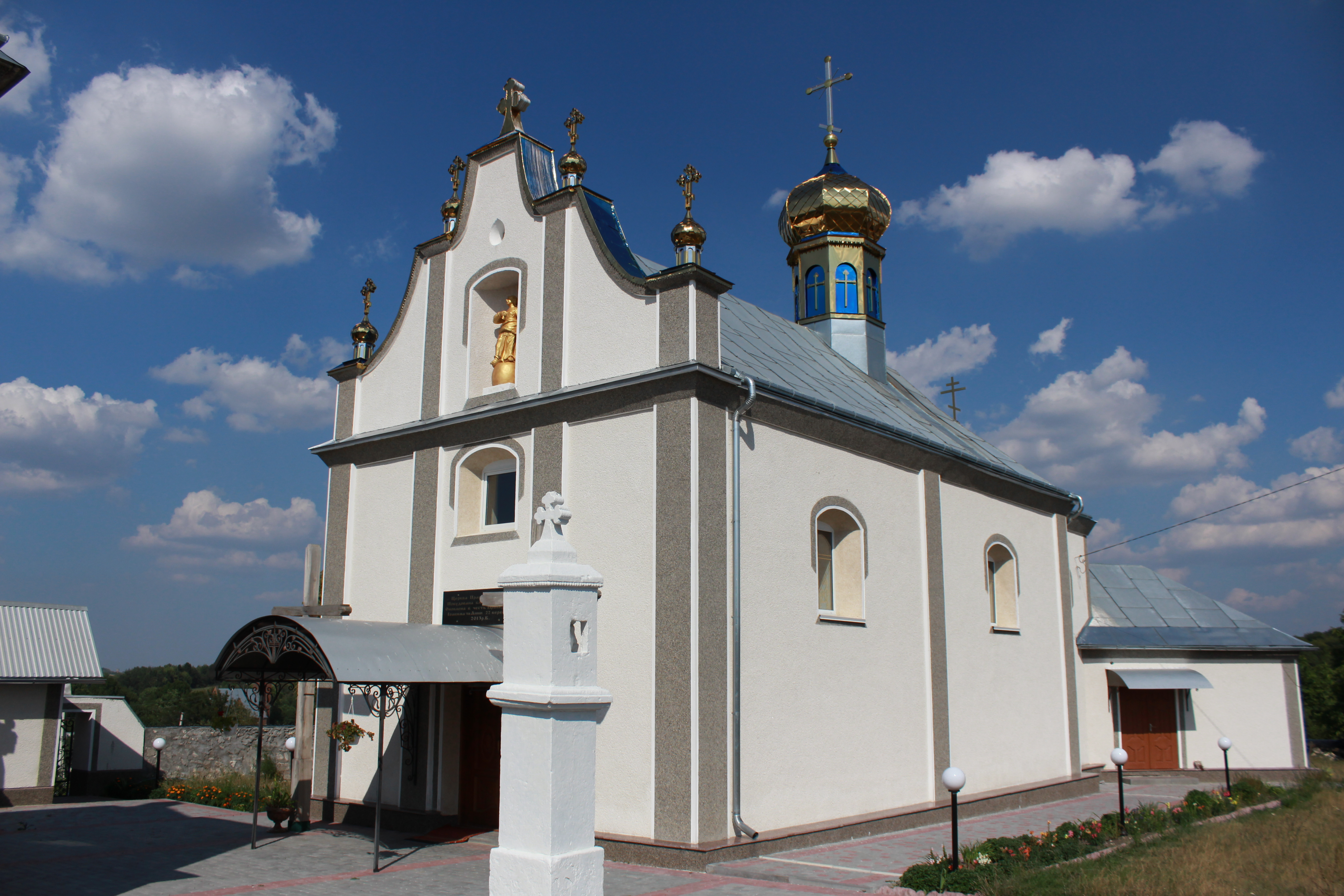
Church of the Immaculate Conception of the Virgin Mary (mur.), p. Khmelyska,

Khmelyska (Ukrainian: Хмелиська) is a village in Pidvolochysk settlement hromada, Ternopil Raion, Ternopil Oblast, Ukraine.

== History ==
The first written mention of the village was in 1564.

After the liquidation of the Pidvolochysk Raion on 19 July 2020, the village became part of the Ternopil Raion.

== Religion ==
- St. Anne church (1805, brick, OCU),
- Holy Cross Exaltation church (1895, RCC).

== Sources ==
- (in Ukrainian) Мельничук Б., Хаварівський Б., Хмелиська // Ternopil Encyclopedic Dictionary: in 4 v. / editorial board: H. Yavorskyi and other, Ternopil: "Zbruch", 2008, V. 3: П—Я, S. 549. — ISBN 978-966-528-279-2.
- "Chmieliska". Geographical Dictionary of the Kingdom of Poland (in Polish). 1. Warszawa: Kasa im. Józefa Mianowskiego. 1880. p. 588.
