= Movchanivka, Ternopil Oblast =

Rural locality in Ternopil Oblast, Ukraine

Movchanivka Мовчанівка
- Location in Ternopil Oblast
- Coordinates: 49°31′23″N 26°1′58″E
- Country: Ukraine
- Oblast: Ternopil Oblast
- Raion: Ternopil Raion
- Hromada: Pidvolochysk settlement hromada
- Time zone: UTC+2 (EET)
  - Summer (DST): UTC+3 (EEST)
- Postal code: 47840

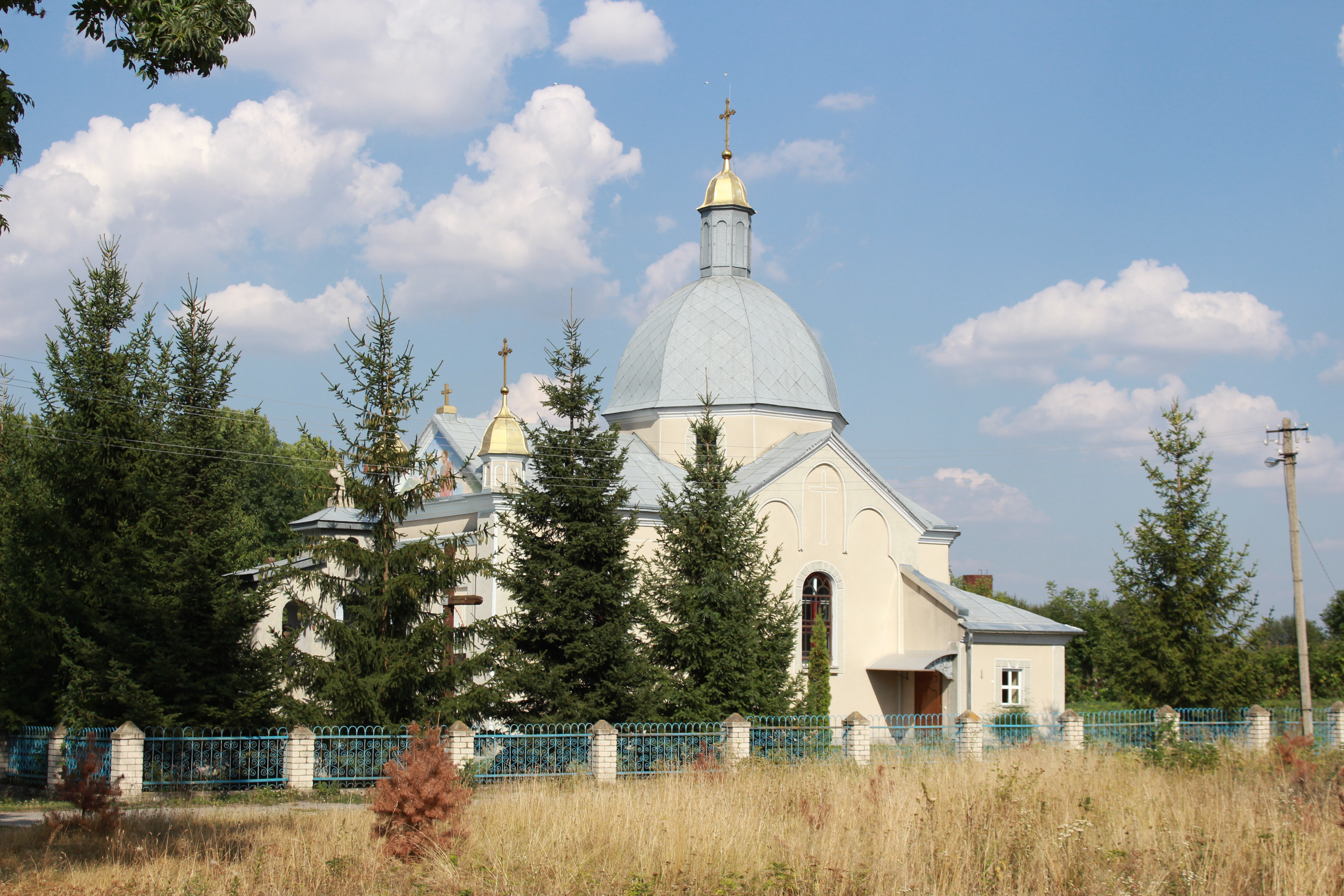

Movchanivka (Ukrainian: Мовчанівка) is a village in Pidvolochysk settlement hromada, Ternopil Raion, Ternopil Oblast, Ukraine.

== History ==
The first written mention of the village was in 1564.

After the liquidation of the Pidvolochysk Raion on 19 July 2020, the village became part of the Ternopil Raion.

== Religion ==
- Saints Peter and Paul church (1905, brick, restored in 1991).

== Sources ==
- (in Ukrainian) Бойчук О., Мовчанівка // Ternopil Encyclopedic Dictionary: in 4 v. / editorial board: H. Yavorskyi and other, Ternopil: "Zbruch", 2005, V. 2: К—О, S. 543. — ISBN 966-528-199-2.
- "Mołczanówka (pow. skałacki)". Geographical Dictionary of the Kingdom of Poland (in Polish). 6. Warszawa: Kasa im. Józefa Mianowskiego. 1885. p. 642.
