= Penkivtsi =

Rural locality in Ternopil Oblast, Ukraine

Penkivtsi Пеньківці
- Location in Ternopil Oblast
- Coordinates: 49°35′37″N 26°10′12″E
- Country: Ukraine
- Oblast: Ternopil Oblast
- Raion: Ternopil Raion
- Hromada: Skoryky rural hromada
- Time zone: UTC+2 (EET)
  - Summer (DST): UTC+3 (EEST)
- Postal code: 47814

Penkivtsi (Ukrainian: Пеньківці) is a village in Skoryky rural hromada, Ternopil Raion, Ternopil Oblast, Ukraine.

== History ==
The first written mention of the village was in 1491.

After the liquidation of the Pidvolochysk Raion on 19 July 2020, the village became part of the Ternopil Raion.

== Religion ==
- Church of the Assumption (1902, brick).

== Sources ==
- (in Ukrainian) Уніят В., Пеньківці // Ternopil Encyclopedic Dictionary: in 4 v. / editorial board: H. Yavorskyi and other, Ternopil: "Zbruch", 2008, V. 3: П—Я, S. 45. — ISBN 978-966-528-279-2.
- "Pieńkowce". Geographical Dictionary of the Kingdom of Poland (in Polish). 8. Warszawa: Kasa im. Józefa Mianowskiego. 1887. p. 92.
