= Koziari =

Rural locality in Ternopil Oblast, Ukraine

Koziari Козярі
- Location in Ternopil Oblast
- Coordinates: 49°38′19″N 26°5′0″E
- Country: Ukraine
- Oblast: Ternopil Oblast
- Raion: Ternopil Raion
- Hromada: Skoryky rural hromada
- Time zone: UTC+2 (EET)
  - Summer (DST): UTC+3 (EEST)
- Postal code: 47811

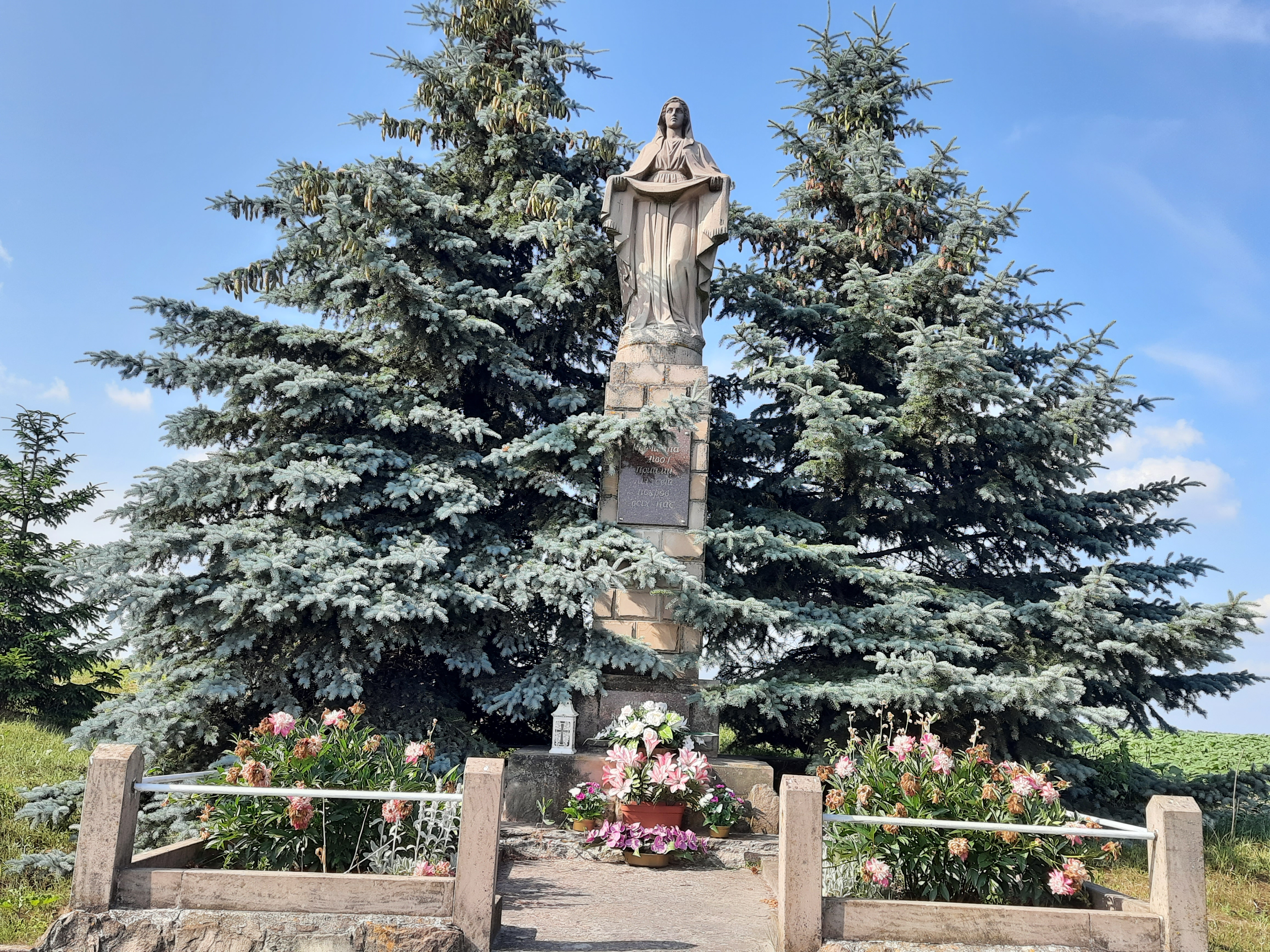
Statue of the Mother of God, Kozyari village, Ternopil district, Ternopil region

Koziari (Ukrainian: Козярі) is a village in Skoryky rural hromada, Ternopil Raion, Ternopil Oblast, Ukraine.

== History ==
The first written mention of the village was in 1504.

After the liquidation of the Pidvolochysk Raion on 19 July 2020, the village became part of the Ternopil Raion.

== Religion ==
- Saint Demetrius Church (1645, wooden, rebuilt in 1775; 2004, brick).

== Sources ==
- (in Ukrainian) Уніят В., Козярі // Ternopil Encyclopedic Dictionary: in 4 v. / editorial board: H. Yavorskyi and other, Ternopil: "Zbruch", 2005, V. 2: К—О, S. 134. — ISBN 966-528-199-2.
- "Koziary". Geographical Dictionary of the Kingdom of Poland (in Polish). 4. Warszawa: Kasa im. Józefa Mianowskiego. 1883. p. 543.
