= Shevchenkove, Ternopil Oblast =

Rural locality in Ternopil Oblast, Ukraine

Shevchenkove Шевченкове
- Location in Ternopil Oblast
- Coordinates: 49°35′52″N 25°59′3″E
- Country: Ukraine
- Oblast: Ternopil Oblast
- Raion: Ternopil Raion
- Hromada: Pidvolochysk settlement hromada
- Time zone: UTC+2 (EET)
  - Summer (DST): UTC+3 (EEST)
- Postal code: 47830

Shevchenkove (Ukrainian: Шевченкове) is a village in Pidvolochysk settlement hromada, Ternopil Raion, Ternopil Oblast, Ukraine.

== History ==
The first written mention of the village was in 1583.

After the liquidation of the Pidvolochysk Raion on 19 July 2020, the village became part of the Ternopil Raion.

== Religion ==
- Saint Peter and Paul church (1924, former Roman Catholic church, UGCC).

== Sources ==
- (in Ukrainian) Гуцал П., Шевченкове // Ternopil Encyclopedic Dictionary: in 4 v. / editorial board: H. Yavorskyi and other, Ternopil: "Zbruch", 2008, V. 3: П—Я, S. 630. — ISBN 978-966-528-279-2.
- "Jacowce, pow. zbarski". Geographical Dictionary of the Kingdom of Poland (in Polish). 1. Warszawa: Kasa im. Józefa Mianowskiego. 1880. p. 359.
