= Vorobiivka, Skoryky rural hromada, Ternopil Raion, Ternopil Oblast =

Rural locality in Ternopil Oblast, Ukraine

Vorobiivka Воробіївка
- Location in Ternopil Oblast
- Coordinates: 49°37′11″N 26°11′21″E
- Country: Ukraine
- Oblast: Ternopil Oblast
- Raion: Ternopil Raion
- Hromada: Skoryky rural hromada
- Time zone: UTC+2 (EET)
  - Summer (DST): UTC+3 (EEST)
- Postal code: 47823

Vorobiivka (Ukrainian: Воробіївка) is a village in Skoryky rural hromada, Ternopil Raion, Ternopil Oblast, Ukraine.

== History ==
The first written mention of the village was in 1583.

After the liquidation of the Pidvolochysk Raion on 19 July 2020, the village became part of the Ternopil Raion.

== Religion ==
- Church of the Nativity of the Blessed Virgin Mary (1899; restored in 2009).

== Sources ==
- "Worobijówka 2.) wś, pow. zbaraski". Geographical Dictionary of the Kingdom of Poland (in Polish). 13. Warszawa: Kasa im. Józefa Mianowskiego. 1893. p. 945.
