= Sukhivtsi, Ternopil Oblast =

Rural locality in Ternopil Oblast, Ukraine

Sukhivtsi Сухівці
- Location in Ternopil Oblast
- Coordinates: 49°39′43″N 26°2′46″E
- Country: Ukraine
- Oblast: Ternopil Oblast
- Raion: Ternopil Raion
- Hromada: Skoryky rural hromada
- Time zone: UTC+2 (EET)
  - Summer (DST): UTC+3 (EEST)
- Postal code: 47811

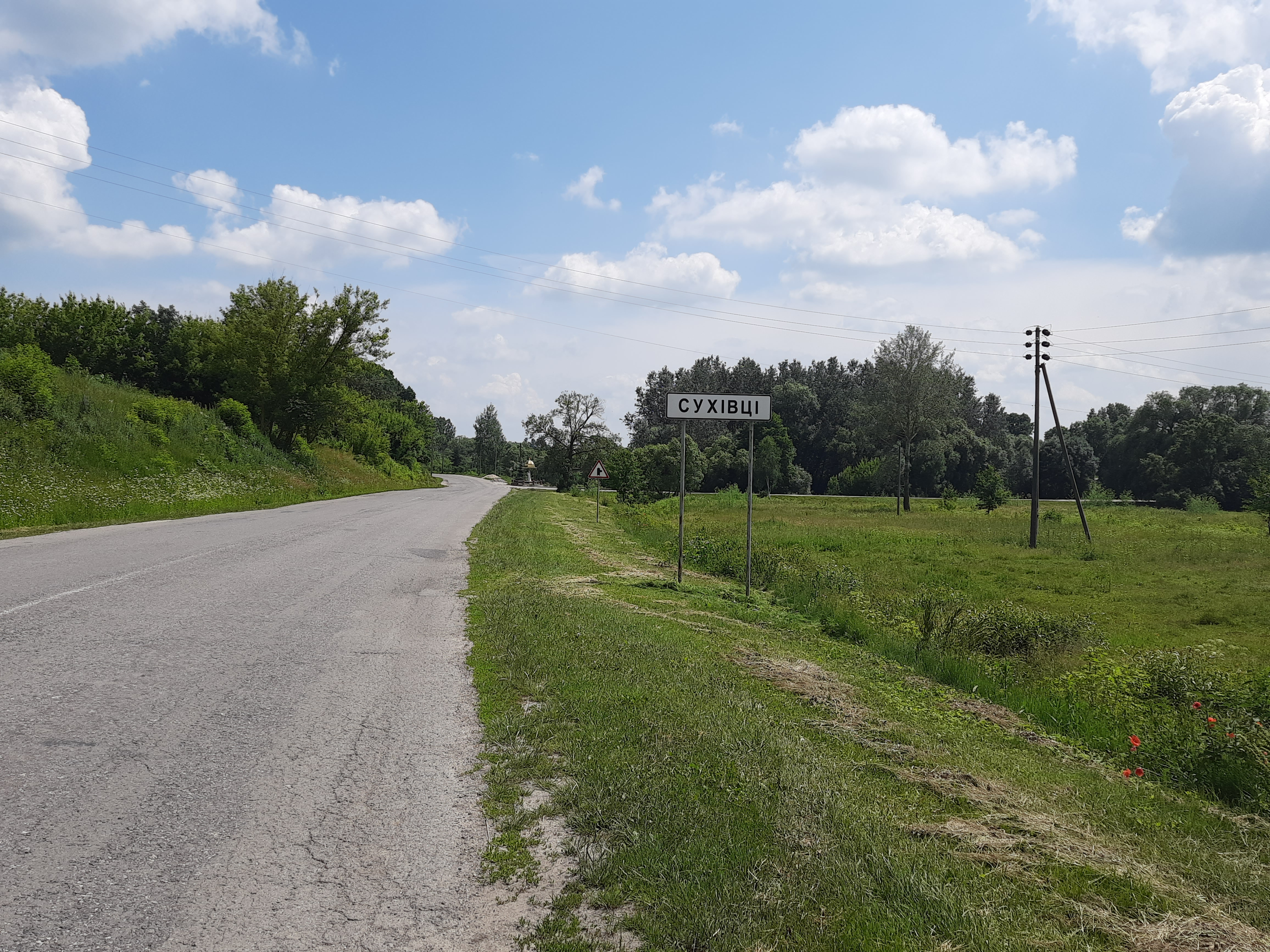
The entrance to Sukhivtsi village, Ternopil district, Ternopil.

Sukhivtsi (Ukrainian: Сухівці) is a village in Skoryky rural hromada, Ternopil Raion, Ternopil Oblast, Ukraine.

== History ==
The first written mention of the village was in 1616.

After the liquidation of the Pidvolochysk Raion on 19 July 2020, the village became part of the Ternopil Raion.

== Religion ==
- Church of the Ascension (1903).

== Sources ==
- (in Ukrainian) Мельничук Б., Сухівці // Ternopil Encyclopedic Dictionary: in 4 v. / editorial board: H. Yavorskyi and other, Ternopil: "Zbruch", 2008, V. 3: П—Я, S. 374. — ISBN 978-966-528-279-2.
- "Suchowce". Geographical Dictionary of the Kingdom of Poland (in Polish). 11. Warszawa: Kasa im. Józefa Mianowskiego. 1890. p. 541.
