= Rosokhuvatets, Pidvolochysk settlement hromada, Ternopil Raion, Ternopil Oblast =

Rural locality in Ternopil Oblast, Ukraine

Rosokhuvatets Росохуватець
- Location in Ternopil Oblast
- Coordinates: 49°33′26″N 26°3′29″E
- Country: Ukraine
- Oblast: Ternopil Oblast
- Raion: Ternopil Raion
- Hromada: Pidvolochysk settlement hromada
- Time zone: UTC+2 (EET)
  - Summer (DST): UTC+3 (EEST)
- Postal code: 47831

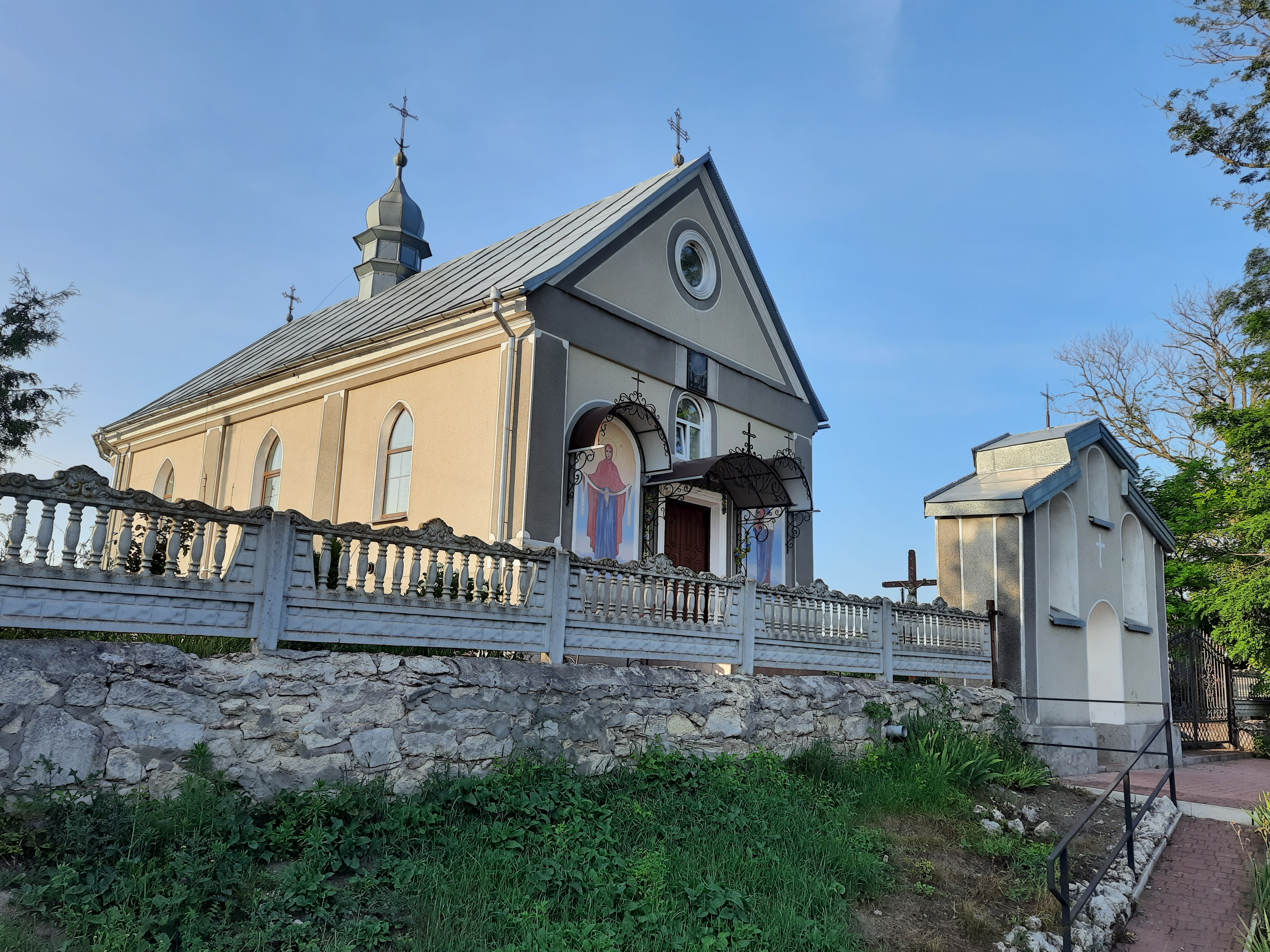
Church of the Intercession (wall), Rosokhuvatec village

Rosokhuvatets (Ukrainian: Росохуватець) is a village in Pidvolochysk settlement hromada, Ternopil Raion, Ternopil Oblast, Ukraine.

== History ==
The first written mention of the village was in 1480.

After the liquidation of the Pidvolochysk Raion on 19 July 2020, the village became part of the Ternopil Raion.

== Religion ==
- Church of the Intercession (1876, brick).

== Sources ==
- (in Ukrainian) Ханас М., Росохуватець // Ternopil Encyclopedic Dictionary: in 4 v. / editorial board: H. Yavorskyi and other, Ternopil: "Zbruch", 2008, V. 3: П—Я, S. 198. — ISBN 978-966-528-279-2.
- "Rosochowaciec (2)". Geographical Dictionary of the Kingdom of Poland (in Polish). 9. Warszawa: Kasa im. Józefa Mianowskiego. 1888. p. 762.
