= Supranivka =

Rural locality in Ternopil Oblast, Ukraine

Supranivka Супрані́вка
- Village
- Interactive map of Supranivka
- Coordinates: 49°33′0″N 26°5′17″E
- Country: Ukraine
- Oblast: Ternopil Oblast
- Raion: Ternopil Raion
- Established: c. 1600s

Population (2007)
  - Total: 369

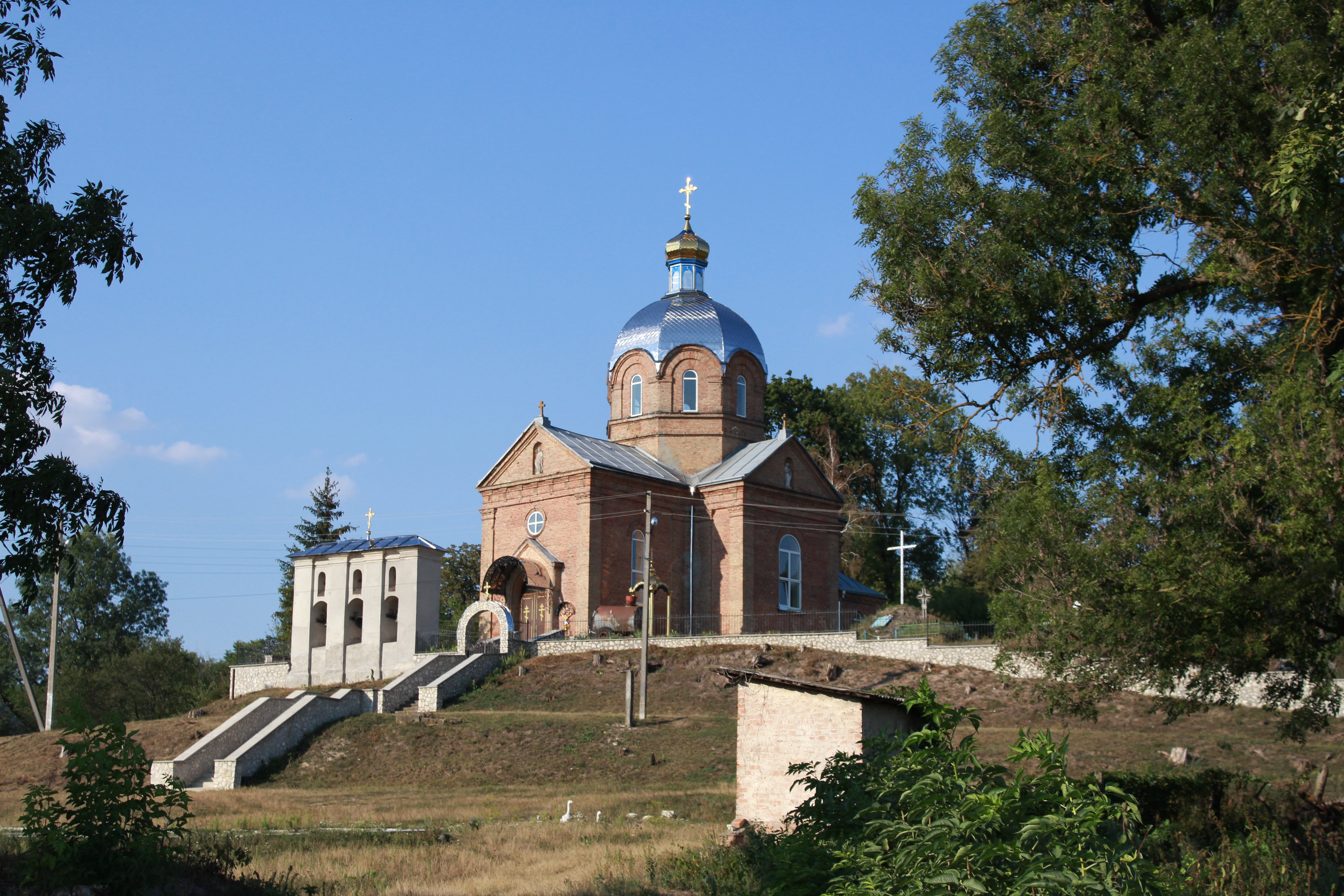
2016 photo of a church in Supranivka

Supranivka is a village in Ternopil Raion of Ternopil Oblast in western Ukraine. It belongs to Pidvolochysk settlement hromada, one of the hromadas of Ukraine. As of 2007 the population consisted of 369 people.

== History ==
The name of the town has been in record since the 1600s. It is thought by those who have origins in the village that it was originally named for a Cossack leader by the name of Suprun. During the days of the Austro-Hungarian Empire, Supranivka was considered to be part of Galicia. In the time between the Russian Revolution and the Second World War, many inhabitants of Supranivka left the country, and some were exiled to the Russian Far East. Today, many houses in Supranivka are decaying, and most of its inhabitants are too poor to repair their heating systems - in 2011, one old house was destroyed in a gas explosion.

Until 18 July 2020, Supranivka belonged to Pidvolochysk Raion. The raion was abolished in July 2020 as part of the administrative reform of Ukraine, which reduced the number of raions of Ternopil Oblast to three. The area of Pidvolochysk Raion was merged into Ternopil Raion.

== Attractions ==
The main attractions in Supranivka are the Church of the Nativity of the Virgin and the symbolic "Grave of Warriors", which was constructed in the 1990s.
