= Terpylivka =

Rural locality in Ternopil Oblast, Ukraine

Terpylivka Терпилівка
- Location in Ternopil Oblast
- Coordinates: 49°37′07″N 26°03′15″E
- Country: Ukraine
- Oblast: Ternopil Oblast
- Raion: Ternopil Raion
- Hromada: Skoryky rural hromada
- Time zone: UTC+2 (EET)
  - Summer (DST): UTC+3 (EEST)
- Postal code: 47813

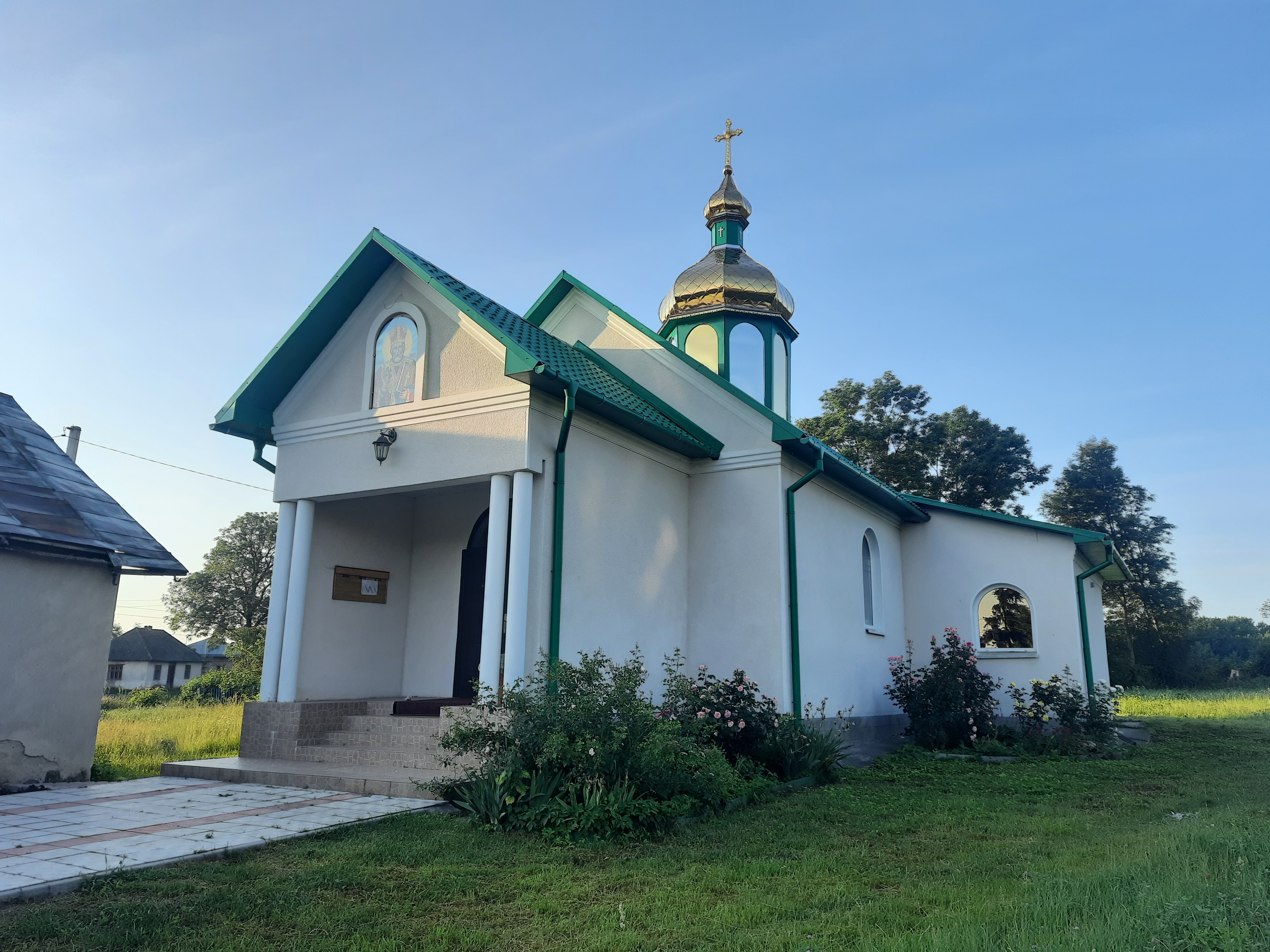
Church of St. Nicholas UGCC, Terpylivka

Terpylivka (Ukrainian: Терпилівка) is a village in Skoryky rural hromada, Ternopil Raion, Ternopil Oblast, Ukraine.

== History ==
The first written mention of the village was in 1548.

After the liquidation of the Pidvolochysk Raion on 19 July 2020, the village became part of the Ternopil Raion.

== Religion ==
- Two churches of St. Nicholas (1995, OCU; 2010, UGCC).

== Sources ==
- (in Ukrainian) Матейко Р., Мельничук Б., Терпилівка // Ternopil Encyclopedic Dictionary: in 4 v. / editorial board: H. Yavorskyi and other, Ternopil: "Zbruch", 2008, V. 3: П—Я, S. 440. — ISBN 978-966-528-279-2.
- "Terpiłówka". Geographical Dictionary of the Kingdom of Poland (in Polish). 12. Warszawa: Kasa im. Józefa Mianowskiego. 1892. p. 315.
