= Lozivka, Skoryky rural hromada, Ternopil Raion, Ternopil Oblast =

Rural locality in Ternopil Oblast, Ukraine

Lozivka Лозівка
- Location in Ternopil Oblast
- Coordinates: 49°37′55″N 25°59′47″E
- Country: Ukraine
- Oblast: Ternopil Oblast
- Raion: Ternopil Raion
- Hromada: Skoryky rural hromada
- Time zone: UTC+2 (EET)
  - Summer (DST): UTC+3 (EEST)
- Postal code: 47812

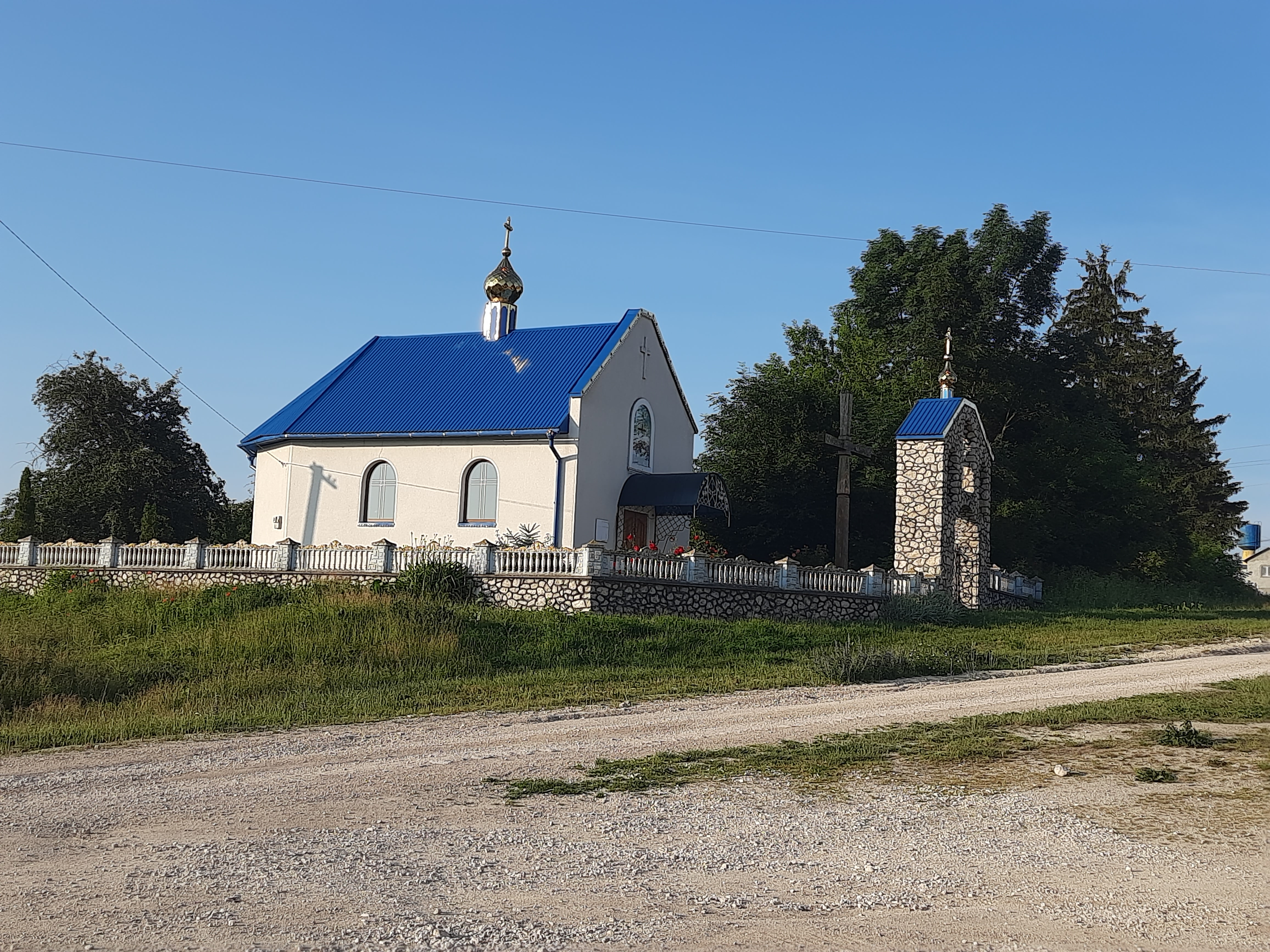
Village Church of Lozivka (Skorykivska Rural Community) Ternopil District, Ternopil Region

Lozivka (Ukrainian: Лозівка) is a village in Skoryky rural hromada, Ternopil Raion, Ternopil Oblast, Ukraine.

== History ==
The first written mention of the village was in 1463.

After the liquidation of the Pidvolochysk Raion on 19 July 2020, the village became part of the Ternopil Raion.

== Notable residents ==
The village was visited by writers Dmytro Pavlychko and Ivan Franko.

== Sources ==
- (in Ukrainian) Уніят В., Ханас В., Лозівка // Ternopil Encyclopedic Dictionary: in 4 v. / editorial board: H. Yavorskyi and other, Ternopil: "Zbruch", 2005, V. 2: К—О, S. 386. — ISBN 966-528-199-2.
- "Łozówka (2)". Geographical Dictionary of the Kingdom of Poland (in Polish). 5. Warszawa: Kasa im. Józefa Mianowskiego. 1884. p. 768.
