= Palchyntsi, Ternopil Oblast =

Rural locality in Ternopil Oblast, Ukraine

Palchyntsi Пальчинці
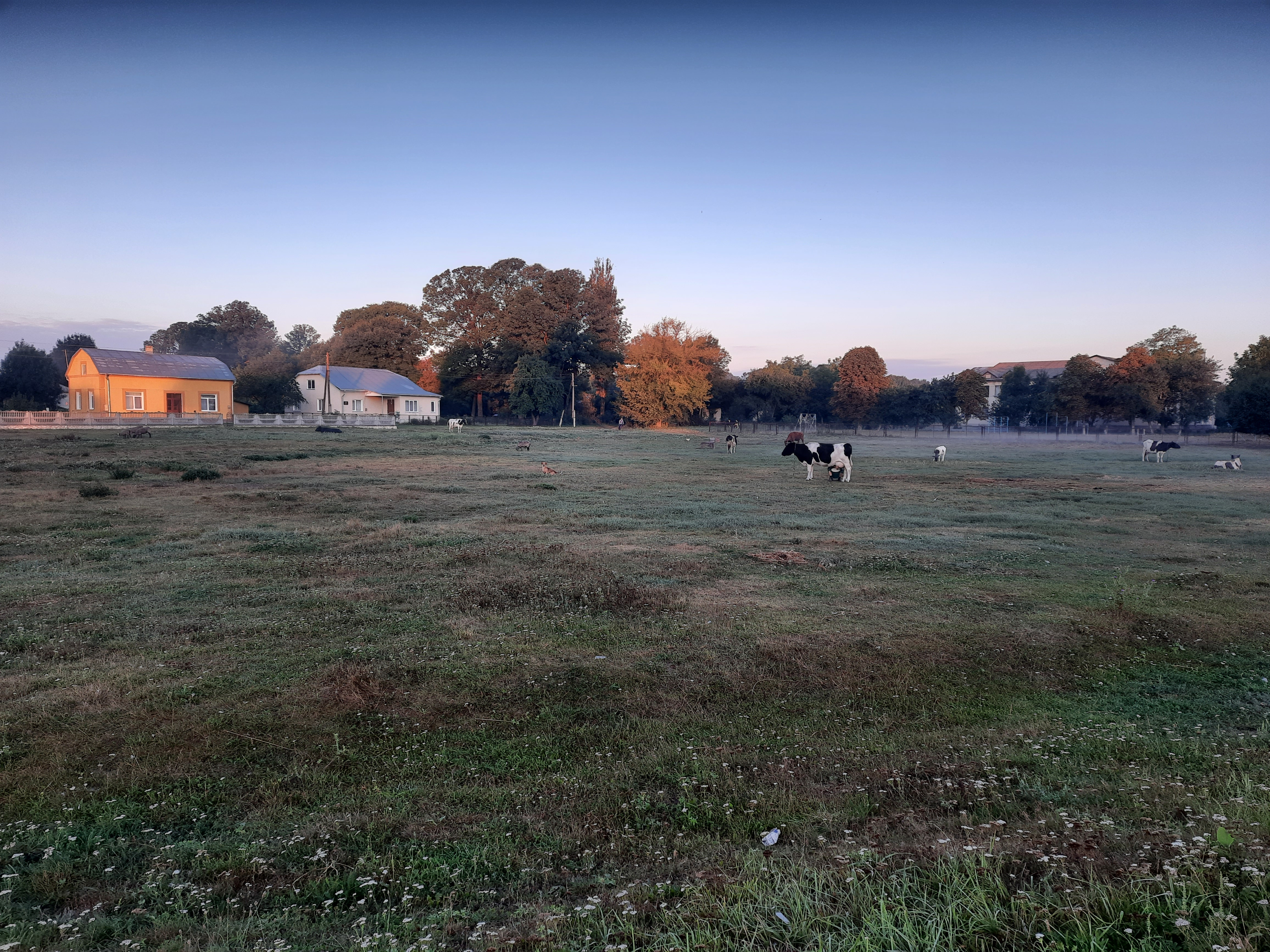
- The village itself

- Location in Ternopil Oblast
- Coordinates: 49°40′40″N 26°14′12″E
- Country: Ukraine
- Oblast: Ternopil Oblast
- Raion: Ternopil Raion
- Hromada: Skoryky rural hromada
- Time zone: UTC+2 (EET)
  - Summer (DST): UTC+3 (EEST)
- Postal code: 47821

Palchyntsi (Ukrainian: Пальчинці) is a village in Skoryky rural hromada, Ternopil Raion, Ternopil Oblast, Ukraine.

== History ==
The first written mention of the village was in 1463.

After the liquidation of the Pidvolochysk Raion on 19 July 2020, the village became part of the Ternopil Raion.

== Religion ==
- St. Michael's church (1899, brick),
- House of Prayer of Evangelicals.

== Sources ==
- (in Ukrainian) Балабан З., Гуцал П., Уніят В., Пальчинці // Ternopil Encyclopedic Dictionary: in 4 v. / editorial board: H. Yavorskyi and other, Ternopil: "Zbruch", 2008, V. 3: П—Я, S. 20. — ISBN 978-966-528-279-2.
- "Palczyńce". Geographical Dictionary of the Kingdom of Poland (in Polish). 7. Warszawa: Kasa im. Józefa Mianowskiego. 1886. p. 825.
