= Fashchivka, Ternopil Oblast =

Urban locality in Luhansk Oblast, Ukraine

Fashchivka Фащівка
- Village
- Location of Fashchivka within Ternopil Oblast#Location of Ternopil within Ukraine Fashchivka (Ukraine)
- Coordinates: 49°23′12″N 26°12′45″E
- Country: Ukraine
- Oblast: Ternopil Oblast
- District: Ternopil Raion
- Founded: 1547
- Elevation: 315 m (1,033 ft)

Population (2001)
  - Total: 212
- Time zone: UTC+2 (EET)
  - Summer (DST): UTC+3 (EEST)
- Postal code: 47862
- Area code: +380 3543

Fashchivka (Ukrainian: Фащівка) is a village in Ternopil Raion (district) in Ternopil Oblast of western Ukraine. It belongs to Pidvolochysk settlement hromada, one of the hromadas of Ukraine.

Until 18 July 2020, Fashchivka was located in Pidvolochysk Raion. The raion was abolished in July 2020 as part of the administrative reform of Ukraine, which reduced the number of raions of Ternopil Oblast to three. The area of Pidvolochysk Raion was merged into Ternopil Raion.
