= Nadiia Morykvas =

Ukrainian writer (born 1952)

- Надія Мирославівна Мориквас
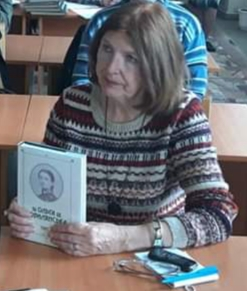
- Born: Nadiia Myroslavivna Morykvas; 9 May 1952 (age 74); Shelpaky, Ukrainian SSR, Soviet Union
- Education: University of Lviv
- Occupations: Writer, essayist, literary critic

Nadiia Myroslavivna Morykvas (Ukrainian: Надія Мирославівна Мориквас; born 9 May 1952) is a Ukrainian writer, essayist, literary critic, candidate of Philological Sciences (2008), and member of the National Union of Journalists (1983) and Writers of Ukraine (1995).

== Biography ==
Nadiia Morykvas was born on 9 May 1952 in Shelpaky, now Skoryky Hromada, Ternopil Raion, Ternopil Oblast, Ukraine.

In 1980, she graduated from University of Lviv. From 2006, she was an intern at the Institute of East Slavic Languages at the Jagiellonian University in Kraków (2006). She worked at the newspapers Lvivskyi Zaliznychnyk, Literaturnyi Lviv (1994–1999 – deputy editor), Halytska Brama, Nasha Shchyschyna (both edited); hosted author's literary programs on Lviv television and oblast radio. In 2000, she was appointed editor-in-chief of the magazine Rich (from 2009 – online edition). She was awarded the S. Fedak (1980) and B. Lepkyi (2006) prizes.

Some of Nadiia Marykvas works have been translated into German, Italian, Hungarian, and Romanian.

== Works ==
Collections of poetry:

- Bile misto (1991)
- Tantsi na lodu (1996)
- Istyna sribnoty (1998)

Prose books:

- Spokusa vichnistiu. Shchodennyk ironichnoi prozy (1997, 1998, 1999)
- Za nas u Lvovi: Mify i mity (2001)
- Rid. Ukrainski khroniky (2002, 2003)
- Melankholiia of Stepan Charnetskyi (2005)
- Chas bez Liubovy (2007)
- De mii brat? (2010)
- Korneliia (2015)
- Vynova hora (2017)
- Liudy svoho chasu (2019)
