= Toky Castle =

Castle in Toky, Ternopil Oblast, Ukraine

- Токівський замок
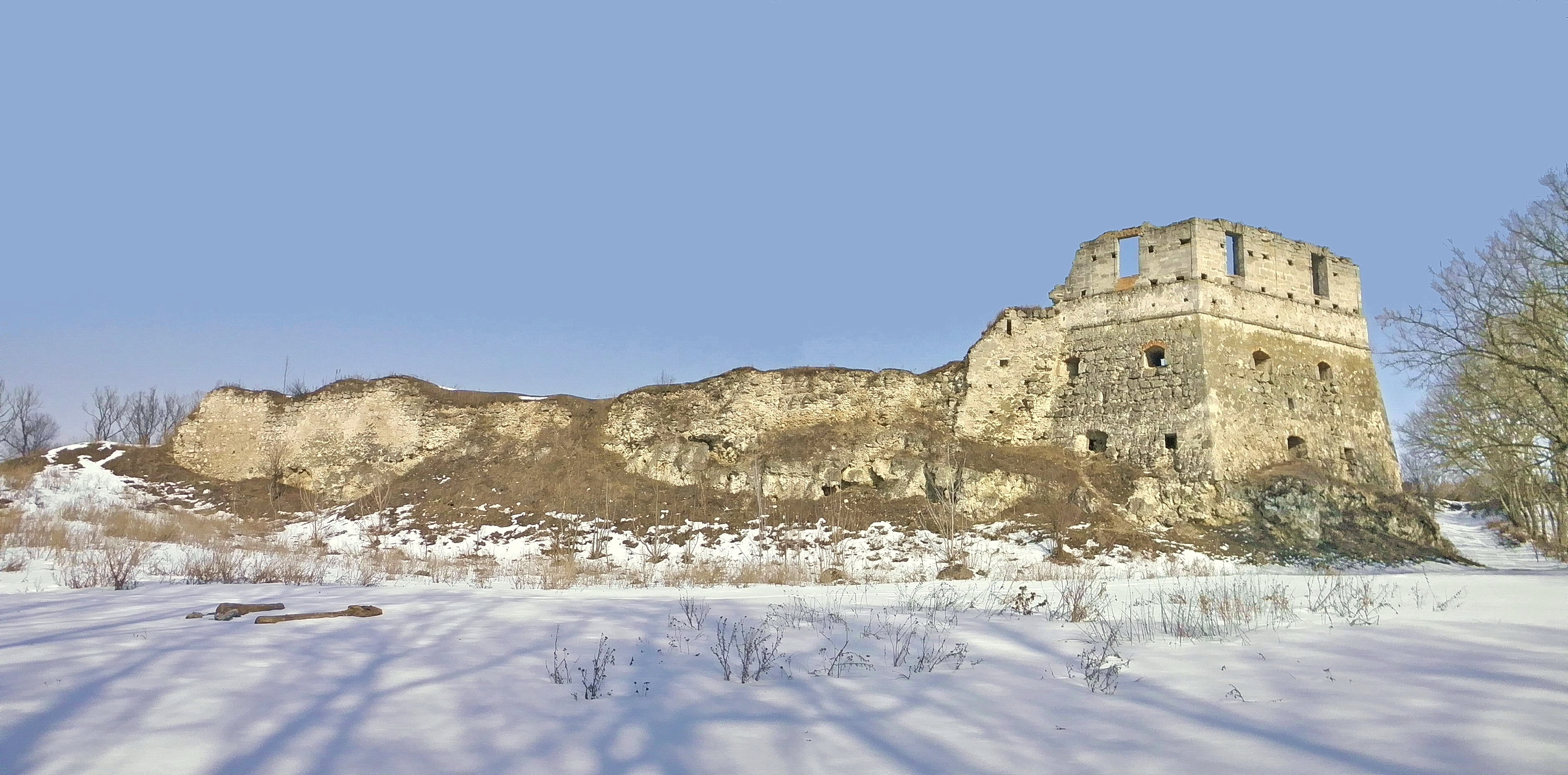
- Modern look of the castle

General information
- Status: Architectural monument of local importance
- Location: Toky, Ternopil Raion, Ternopil Oblast
- Country: Ukraine
- Coordinates: 49°38′20″N 26°13′36″E

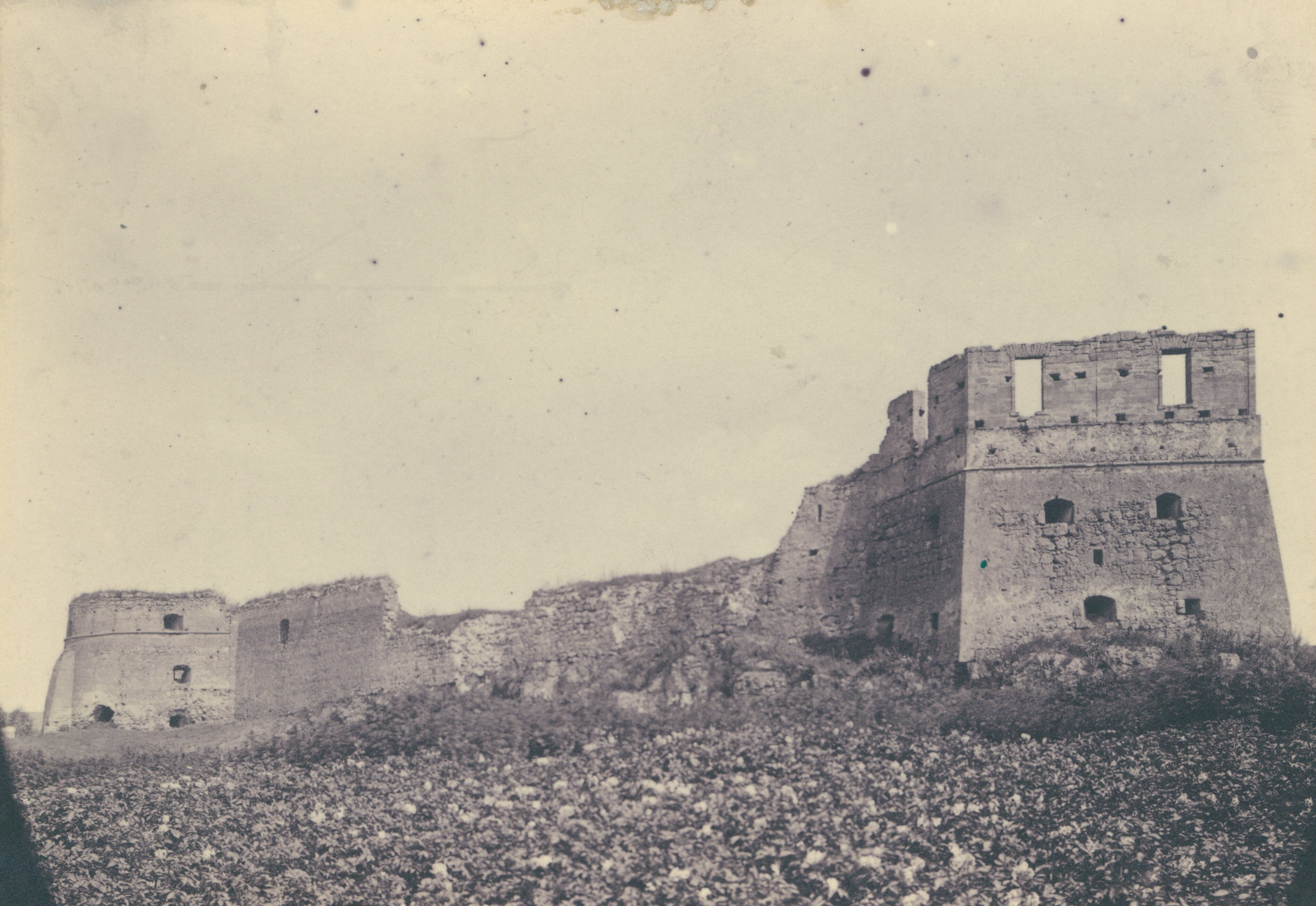
Castle in Toky, circa 1905.

The Toky Castle (Ukrainian: Токівський замок, romanized: Tokivs'jyi zamok) is located in Toky, Ternopil Oblast, Ukraine. The castle is located on a stone hill of the peninsula, which is surrounded by a pond on the old channel of the Zbruch River, and an architectural monument of local importance.

== History ==
The castle was built in the late 16th century by Bratslav voivode Janusz Zbaraski. After the Zbaraski family, in 1631, the fortress in Toky was passed to the Wiśniowiecki family. In 1648, during Bohdan Khmelnytskyi's uprising, the castle was captured by the Cossacks. In 1675, during the invasion, it was destroyed by the Turks.

It was rebuilt by the end of the 18th century and kept in good condition. Today, the ruins of the pentagonal tower and part of the fortress wall remain.
