= Pidvolochysk settlement hromada =

Hromada in Ternopil Oblast, Ukraine

Pidvolochysk settlement hromada Підволочиська селищна громада
- hromada
- Location within Ternopil Oblast Location within Ukraine
- Coordinates: 49°31′32″N 26°8′9″E
- Country: Ukraine
- Oblast: Ternopil Oblast
- Raion: Ternopil Raion
- Administrative center: Pidvolochysk

Government
  - Hromada head: Vitalii Datsko

Area
  - Total: 352.1 km^{2} (135.9 sq mi)

Population (2022)
  - Total: 18,356
- Urban-type settlement: 1
- Villages: 22
- Website: pidvolochyska-gromada.gov.ua

Pidvolochysk settlement hromada (Ukrainian: Підволочиська селищна територіальна громада, romanized: Pidvolochyska selyshchna terytorialna hromada) is a hromada in Ukraine, in Ternopil Raion of Ternopil Oblast. The administrative center is the urban-type settlement of Pidvolochysk. Its population is 18,356 (2022 estimate).

== Settlements ==
The community consists of 1 urban-type settlement (Pidvolochysk) and 22 villages:

- Bohdanivka
- Halushchyntsi
- Dorofiivka
- Zherebky
- Ivanivka
- Kamianky
- Kachanivka
- Klebanivka
- Korshylivka
- Myslova
- Movchanivka
- Orikhovets
- Rozhysk
- Rosokhuvatets
- Staromishchyna
- Supranivka
- Tarnoruda
- Turivka
- Fashchivka
- Khmelyska
- Chernylivka
- Shevchenkove
