= Skoryky rural hromada =

Rural hromada in Ternopil Oblast, Ukraine

Skoryky rural hromada Скориківська сільська громада
- hromada
- Location within Ternopil Oblast Location within Ukraine
- Coordinates: 49°35′49″N 26°08′33″E
- Country: Ukraine
- Oblast: Ternopil Oblast
- Raion: Ternopil Raion
- Administrative center: Skoryky

Government
  - Hromada head: Andrii Dobrianskyi

Area
  - Total: 265.0 km^{2} (102.3 sq mi)

Population (2022)
  - Total: 8,105
- Villages: 23
- Website: ckorykivska-gromada.gov.ua

Skoryky rural territorial hromada (Ukrainian: Скориківська територіальна громада, romanized: Skorykivska silska terytorialna hromada) is a hromada in Ukraine, in Ternopil Raion of Ternopil Oblast. The administrative center is the village of Skoryky. It was established on 29 July 2015.

== Settlements ==
The hromada consists of 23 villages:

- Vorobiivka
- Hnylytsi
- Hnylychky
- Holotky
- Holoshyntsi
- Hushchanky
- Klymkivtsi
- Koziari
- Koshliaky
- Lysychyntsi
- Lozivka
- Medyn
- Nove Selo
- Obodivka
- Palchyntsi
- Penkivtsi
- Prosivtsi
- Skoryky
- Sukhivtsi
- Terpylivka
- Toky
- Shelpaky
- Shchasnivka
