= Pidvolochysk Raion =

Former subdivision of Ternopil Oblast, Ukraine

Pidvolochysk Raion Підволочиський район
- Raion
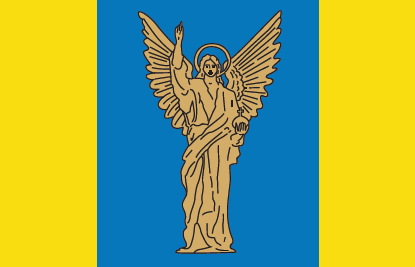
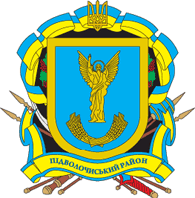
- Flag Coat of arms

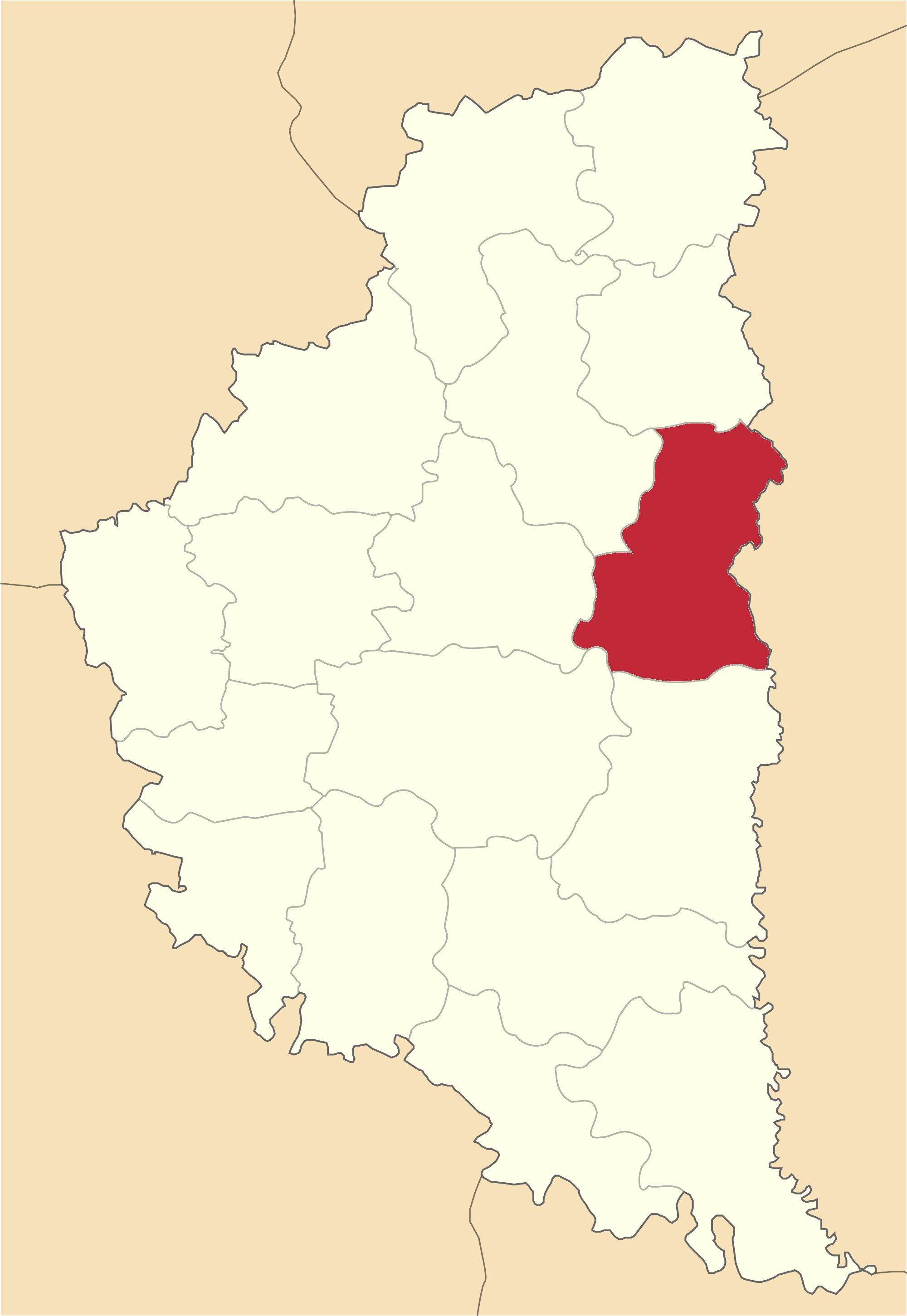
- Coordinates: 49°31′N 26°04′E
- Country: Ukraine
- Oblast: Ternopil Oblast
- Established: 1939
- Disestablished: 18 July 2020
- Admin. center: Pidvolochysk
- Subdivisions: List: — city councils; — settlement councils; — rural councils; Number of localities: — cities; — urban-type settlements; 60 — villages; — rural settlements

Area
  - Total: 0.837 km^{2} (0.323 sq mi)

Population (2020)
  - Total: 40,668
  - Density: 48,600/km^{2} (126,000/sq mi)
- Time zone: UTC+02:00 (EET)
  - Summer (DST): UTC+03:00 (EEST)
- Area code: +380

Pidvolochysk Raion (Ukrainian: Підволочиський район) was a raion (district) in Ternopil Oblast in western Ukraine. Its administrative center was the urban-type settlement of Pidvolochysk. The raion was abolished on 18 July 2020 as part of the administrative reform of Ukraine, which reduced the number of raions of Ternopil Oblast to three. The area of Pidvolochysk Raion was merged into Ternopil Raion. The last estimate of the raion population was 40,668 (2020 est.).

At the time of disestablishment, the raion consisted of three hromadas:

- Pidvolochysk settlement hromada with the administration in Pidvolochysk;
- Skalat urban hromada with the administration in the city of Skalat;
- Skoryky rural hromada with the administration in the selo of Skoryky.

== See also ==
- Subdivisions of Ukraine
