= Yann Benoist =

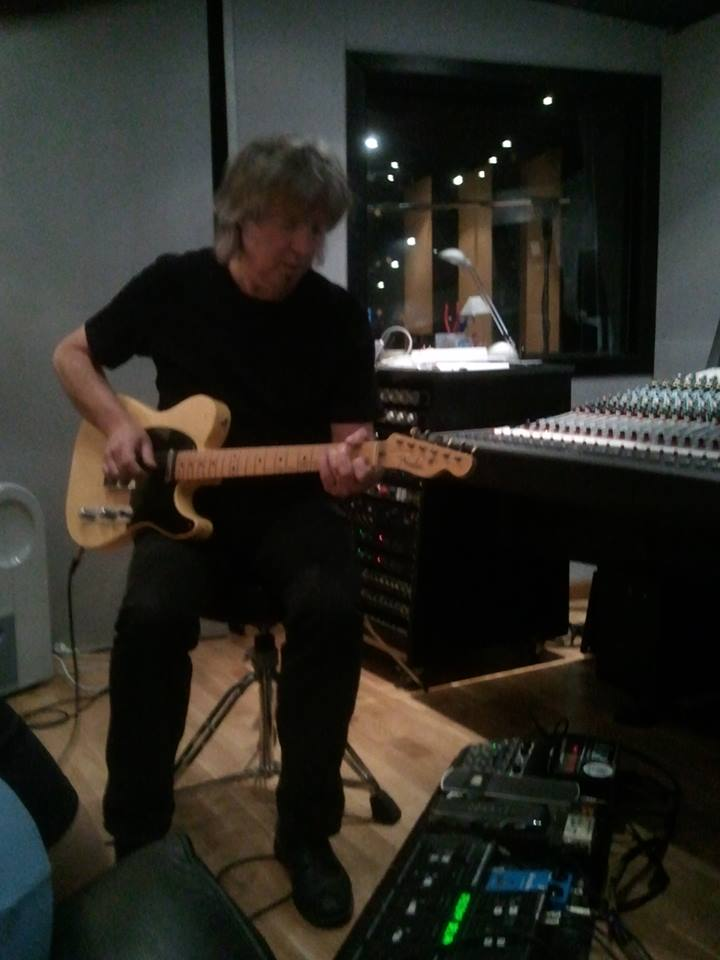
- "Studio de Bretagne" Auray 2011

Background information
- Born: 6 February 1951 (age 75); Dinan, France
- Genres: Jazz; jazz fusion; blues; rock; folk; pop; rhythm and blues; funk
- Occupations: Musician , composer , writer .
- Instrument: Guitar
- Years active: 1969-present
- Website: www.yannbenoist.net

Yann Benoist (born 6 February 1951) is a French session guitarist, performer, singer, composer, conductor, arranger and writer .

== Early life ==
Yann Benoist was born in Dinan, Brittany. At age 8 his parents enrolled him in a music academy. They bought him his first guitar when he was eleven and he started learning to play with friends and different teachers.

== Career ==
When Benoist was 18 he started playing and singing, juggling time between school and gigging with some local bands in Brittany and Normandy.

During 1975 he worked with the Switzerland duet Richard et Samuel. The next year, he learned for a while with Pierre Cullaz (famous sessionman from the sixties) in Paris.

By the end of the seventies he was a member of the Francis Bourrec quartet. They won the first prize at La Défense Jazz Festival in 1978. That same year he got a certificate from the Berklee College of Music.

Since then he has worked on stage or sessions for commercials, TV movies, TV shows, and musical comedies, with a lot of numerous French stars such as Renaud, Gilbert Becaud, Serge Lama, Patricia Kaas, Mireille Mathieu, Richard Bohringer, Jean Guidoni, Sylvie Vartan, Sheila (singer), Hugues Aufray, Jean-Luc Lahaye, Julien Clerc, Dave (singer), Patrick Hernandez, Lucky Blondo, Nancy Holloway, Marcel Azzola, Sacha Distel, Murray Head, Maurane, Marie Myriam, Francis Cabrel, Smain, Dorothée, Gilles Servat, William Sheller, Jacques Loussier, and Michel Legrand.

In 1983 he was a member of Space, with Didier Marouani, for the first big tour organized in the USSR. They performed 21 concerts in Moscow's Olympic Stadium, Leningrad's Saint-Petersburg Sports and Concert Complex and Kyiv's Palace of Sports for about 600,000 people, and in 1992 they performed the first concert authorized on the Red Square in Moscow, for 360,000 people.

In 1989 and 2002 he was musical director for Sheila at the Olympia. In 2011 he was conductor for Joel Prevost at the Alhambra.

He was involved in all Version of "Envoyé Spécial " on TV (A2, FR 2) from 1990 to 2016

He is a composer for APM Music and Universal Publishing.

== Selective discography ==
=== As a leader ===
- Bye Bye Femme (CFD)
- Rainbowcity (Night And Day distribution)
- Décalage (InouÏe distribution)
- Hard Groove (Diggin' Miles Davis, Randy Brecker) (UVM Distribution)

=== As a sideman ===
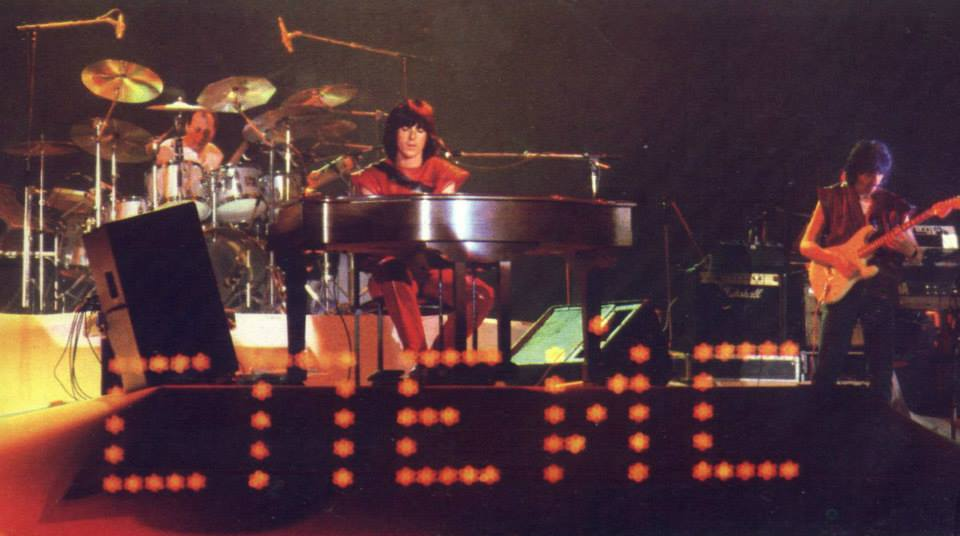
Didier Marouani, Yann Benoist, Bunny Rizzitelli (Space Moscou 1983)

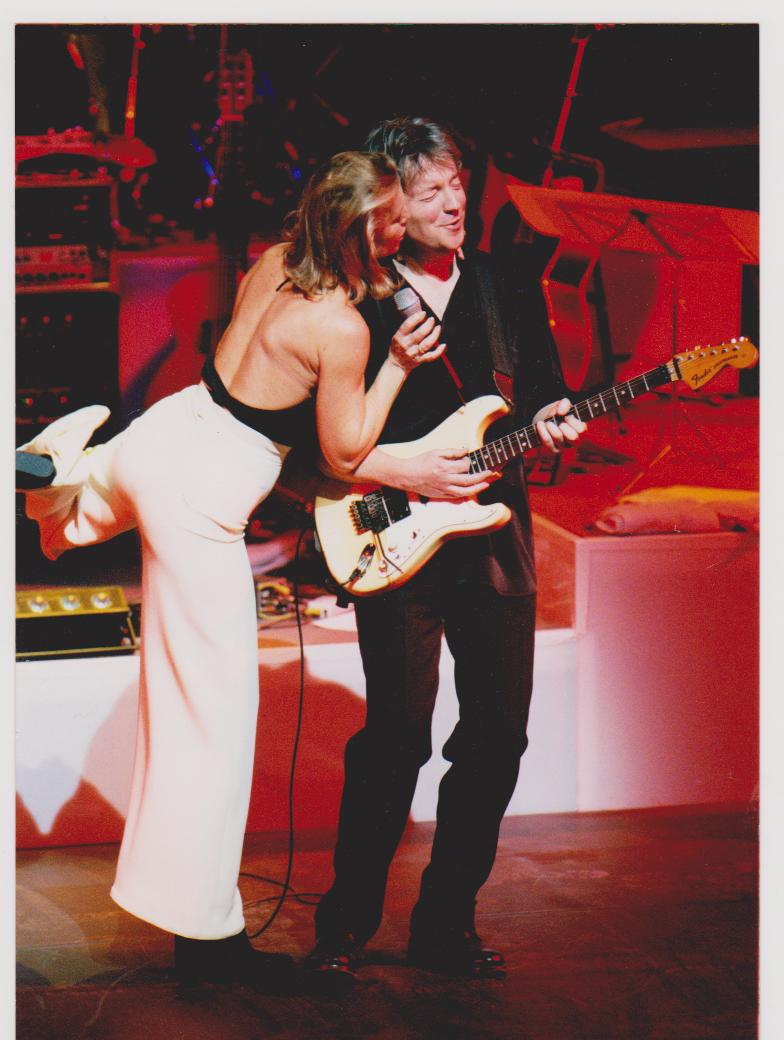
Sheila Yann Benoist, Olympia 1999

- Marie Myriam J'aime quand tu es jaloux (Ariola)
- Renaud Un Olympia pour moi tout seul (Polydor)
- Richard Sanderson Surprise (Vogue)
- William Sheller Simplement (album de William Sheller) (Philips Records)
- Didier Marouani et Paris-France-Transit Space Concerts en URSS (Vogue)

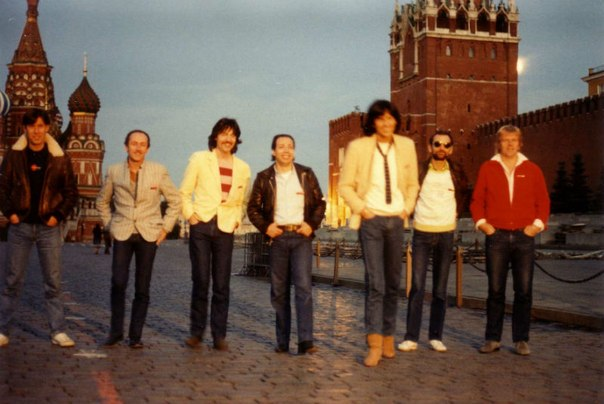
Paris-France-Transit Moscou Place rouge 1983

- Richard SandersonFairy Tales (Vogue)
- Bibie Tout doucement (CBS)
- Daniel Lévi Cocktail (EMI)
- Jean-Luc Lahaye Flagrant Délit de Tendresse (Philips)
- Jean-Luc Lahaye Live au Palais des Sports (Philips)
- Jeff Joseph One Two Three (Polydor)
- Sheila Je suis venue te dire que je m'en vais - Sheila live à l'Olympia 89 (Polygram)
- Sacha Distel Les Plus Grands Succes De Sacha Distel (Carrere)
- Sylvie Vartan Concert à Sofia Sylvie Vartan discography (Philips)
- Didier Marouani Space (French band) Space Magic Concerts(BMG Russia)
- Sheila On S'Dit plus rien (Carrere Music)
- Nana Mouskouri Hollywood (Philips)
- Jana Herzen Soup's on Fire (Motema Music)
- Renaud Le Retour de la Chetron Sauvage (Virgin)
- Dave Toujours le même bleu (Sony Music)
- Gilbert Bécaud L'Olympia 97 (BMG)
- Sheila Le Meilleur de Sheila (Flarenash)
- Sheila Sheila live à l'Olympia 98 (Wagram Music)
- Alabina Sahara (Sony Music)
- Didier Marouani Space (French band) Symphonic Space Dream (BMG Russia)
- Sheila Dense (album de Sheila) (EMI)
- Sheila Medley Disco (Wagram Music)
- Serge Lama Feuille à feuille (WEA)
- Sheila Seulement pour toi (Warner Music)
- Sheila Sheila en concert à l'Olympia 2002 - Jamais deux sans toi (Warner Music)
- Serge Lama Un jour, une vie (Warner Music)
- Serge Lama Pluri((elles))(Wea Music)
- Gilbert Bécaud Suite (Capitol Music)
- Da Vinci Vox The Hidden Message (EMI Label One)
- Manau Seul Et En Silence - Acoustique 2007
- Yvon Chateigner (feat) Ornella Vanoni L'amore l'AmoreUniversal)
- Iwan B La Quête, Ar C'hlask (Coop Breizh)

== Videos ==
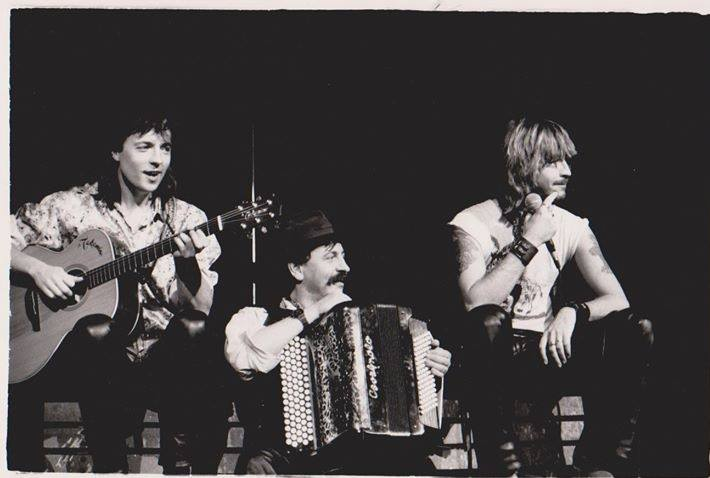
Renaud, J L Roques, Yann Benoist, Zénith 1986, Paris

- Renaud La Chetron Sauvage (Live Zénith 1986)
- Jean-Luc Lahaye Débarquez Moi (Live Palais des Sports 1987)
- Sheila Je suis venue te dire que je m'en vais (Live Olympia 1989)
- Mireille Mathieu Live Palais 1990
- Sylvie Vartan Concert a Sofia
- Dorothée L'album en Video
- Sheila Sheila à L'Olympia 1999

== DVDs ==
=== As a leader ===
- Rencontre d'un Soir (guest): Martin Taylor (guitarist), Iwan B

=== As a sideman ===
- Sheila (singer) Sheila en concert à l'Olympia 2002 - Jamais deux sans toi
- Space Concert In Moscow (once upon a time in the East)
- Space Space Magic Concerts
- Serge Lama Un jour, une vie (Live Bercy)
- Sheila Sheila Live 89 à l'Olympia
- Renaud La Chetron sauvage (Virgin music)

== Composer ==
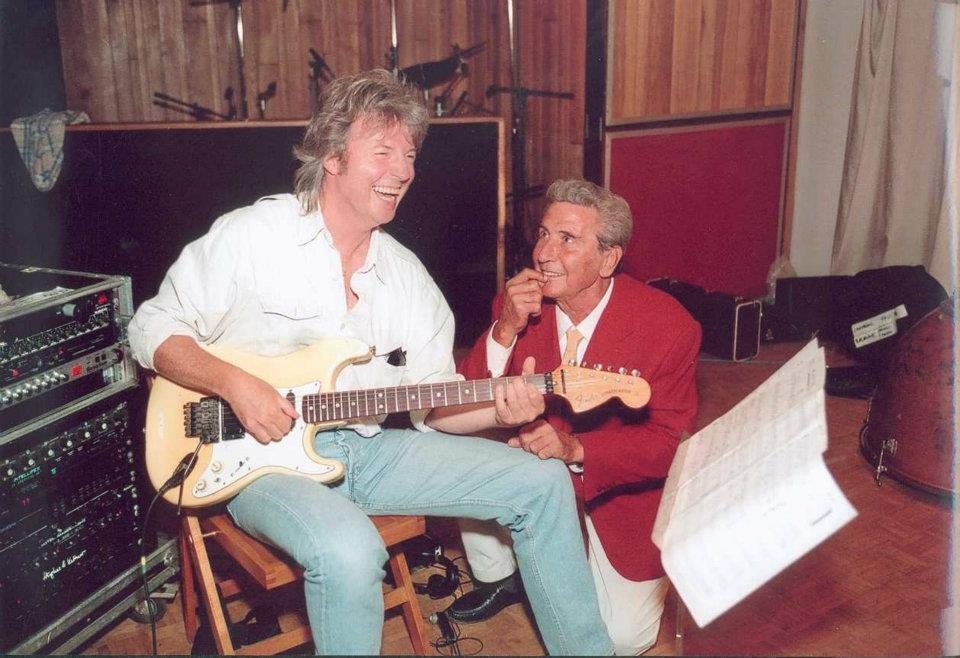
Gilbert Becaud Yann Benoist Studio Musika 1997

- 1983 Alliance (Tabata Music) (Various Composers)
- 1987 Bye bye femme (CFD)
- 1997 Rainbowcity (Night and Day) (Spotify)

including :Gilbert Bécaud B+B(je t'appartiens) Composer Yann Benoist Lyrics Pierre Delanoë / Manny Curtis

- 2001 Serge Lama " Feuilles à feuilles" (Various composers)
- 2002 Décalage (Sobridis musique) (Spotify)
- 2005 RockAnd Roll Comedy (UPPM) (Various Composers) (Spotify)
- 2006 French Songs Universal Publishing (UPPM) (Spotify)
- 2007 Rock And Roll Comedy 2 (UPPM) (Various Composers)
- 2010 Funk Addict APM Music (Spotify)
- 2012 Indie Rock Session (KAPAGAMA) (Spotify)
- 2015 Sunny Guitars (Musique & Music)" Echappée Belle " (Various Composers) (Spotify)
- 2016 Melody Box " Des Racines et des Ailes " (Various Composers)
- 2018 CDM Music (Picking) "La Maison France 5" (Various Composers)
- 2019 Encore Merci Publishing "Acoustic Ballads"
- 2022 CDM Music (Solo instruments positive) (Various Composers)
- 2023 Amour Passion Editions(Various Composers)

== Movie TV scores ==
- 1979 Les Joyeuses Colonies de vacances
- 1982 On s'en fout on s'aime
- 1990 Envoyé spécial Envoyé spécial
- 1992 Les Taupes-Niveaux
- 1993 Envoyé Spécial Envoyé spécial
- 1994 Jeanne
- 1996 La Guerre Des Poux

== Bibliography ==
- Yann Benoist "Des Bises et des Shows " Ed Maîa (July 2026) (ISBN 979-104252-688-7)
- Serge Lama "La rage de vivre " (Fréderic Quinonero) Ed L'Archipel (September 2021) (ISBN 978-280984-066-7)
- JazzBluesNews " Yann Benoist Interview " http://jazzbluesnews.com/2021/07/18/yann-benoist/
- Blues& Co N° 83 (Mars, April, May 2018) "Le Blues des Soviets" (Yann Benoist Interview)
- Dominique Grandfils "Anthologie du Rock Français de 1956 à 2017" Ed Camion Blanc (June 2017) (ISBN 978-235779-926-4)
- Renaud "Des que le vent soufflera "(Regis Lefévre) Ed Pierre-Marcel Favre (July 1985) (ISBN 978-2-8289-0195-0)
- Disc instruments international N° 87 September October 1985 (banc d' essais)
- Bécaud "L'Homme à la cravate à pois" (Bernard Reval)Ed Du Voyage (1995) (ISBN 978-2-9509-2720-0)
- Mathias "L' amour "a capella" (Mathias Ollivier) Ed Art Access (April 2015) (ISBN 978-2-3618-5007-4)
- Guitar et bass N° 47 January 98 (A.Brodzki) ISSN 1250-0216 OCLC 1250-0216
- Armor magazine N°442 November 2006 Yannick Pelletier ISSN 0044-8966 OCLC 0044-8966
- Home-Studio N° 253 July/August 2010 (Olivia Clain) ISSN 1628-3392 OCLC 1628-3392
- Sheila "Star Française "(Frederic Quinero) Ed Didier Carpentier (2012) (ISBN 978-2-84167-782-5)
- Guitar Part N° 333 H December 2021 Florent Passamonti " Hard Groove" (Diggin' Miles Davis Randy Brecker)
- Jazz Magazine N°766 December 2023 Playlist (ISSN 2425-7869)
- Jazz Magazine N°767 February 2024 Felix Marciano (ISSN 2425-7869)
