= Evgeny Khmara =

Ukrainian musician (born 1988)

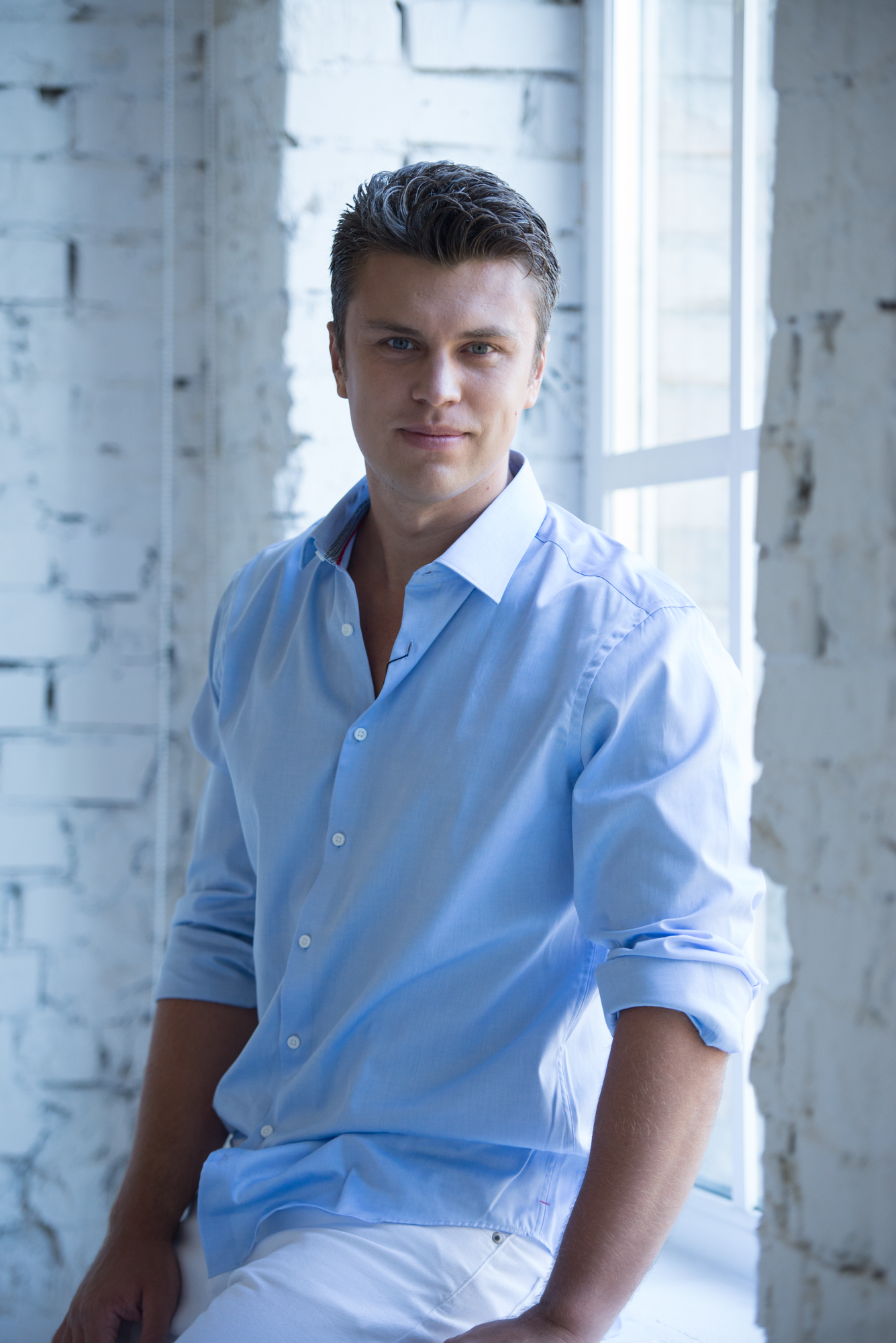
- Born: Yevhen Stanislavovych Khmara; 10 March 1988 (age 38); Kyiv, Ukrainian SSR, Soviet Union
- Occupations: Composer, virtuoso pianist, film score composer
- Years active: 2004–present
- Known for: appearances in Ukraine Got Talent, X-Factor, The Voice of Ukraine
- Children: 3
- Musical career
- Instrument: Grand Piano
- Website: evgenykhmara.com/en/

Evgeny Stanislavovych Khmara (Ukrainian: Євген Станіславович Хмара, IPA: [jeu̯ˈɦɛn stɐn⁽ʲ⁾iˈslɑwowɪtʃ ˈxmarɐ]; born 10 March 1988) is a Ukrainian composer, virtuoso pianist and film score composer, known for his performances in television talent shows and international concerts.

== Life and career ==
Evgeny Khmara was born on 10 March 1988, in Kyiv. He has a younger sister called Victoria.

Khmara began composing music during childhood and studied at a local music school from 1994 to 2003. From 2004 he began working in the music industry. In 2005, he participated in the opening of the Jaguar Motor Show.

Whilst maintaining his artistic activity, he studied at the Ukrainian Academy of Business and Entrepreneurship (UABP), Kyiv (2005-2010). From 2010 Evgeny begins to make piano arrangements for the Ukrainian show business stars. In 2012 he became a finalist at the Ukraine Got Talent show. From 2012 to 2018 he had been performing as the main musician for the X-Factor.

In 2014, Khmara visited the White House as the cultural ambassador of Ukraine. In December 2014, participated in the opening of the Maserati Motor Show on Cyprus.

In 2015, he collaborates with companies such as Kärcher Ukraine (writing hymn), Mercedes-Benz in Ukraine, performance at the Rome Fashion Week. In Spring of the same year the first all-Ukrainian tour "Piano vs Dubstep" took place. On 15 September, he published a YouTube video of himself playing his cover of "In And Out Of Love" by Armin Van Buuren with the title "Passengers were shocked." The video ended up receiving over 75,000,000 views on the platform as of August, 2022.

In 2016, the encore show "Znamenie" in Kyiv and the following all-Ukrainian tour. In Spring 2016, participated in the opening of the annual ceremony "Human of the Year" (Ukraine's award). In Summer 2016, performance in Canada at the Mississauga Living Art Center at the Miss Ukrainian Canada beauty contest. Cooperation with the Antonov company, devotes the company to the song In the sky. Evgeny recorded cover version of the song "1944" — the winning song at the Eurovision 2016 by Jamala.

In spring 2017, his show, "The Wheel of Life", took place at the performing arts center October Palace in Kyiv. The director of the show was Herman Nenov. More than 150 people worked on the show, preparations lasted during one year. More than sixty artists performed on the stage. Evgeny was supported by Ukrainian singers: Zlata Ogniewich and TAYANNA. The concert was attended by 1,800 spectators. The show was repeatedly featured on the central TV channels of Ukraine. In July 2017, Playing on night concert in Lutsk Castle, Lutsk. On 8 September 2017 playing on the concert at Pastichio Theater, Limassol.

In 2018, participated in the Yamaha presentation of new instruments during the Yamaha World Conference in Dubai; introduced Ukraine to the cultural forum in China. Spoke at concert at Buckingham Palace, London. Playing at "Creative Women Conference" in Cyprus in the front of the most powerful women in the world.

In December 2018, the solo concert "30", was held in the Palace of Ukraine, Kyiv. The show was attended by 3,900 spectators. 130 musicians performed on the stage. The Ukrainian singer Oleg Vinnik became as special guest of the show.

Khmara worked with Volvo Cars to produce the music for the project "Freedom to move. Freedom to create".

Khmara has performed internationally, including concerts in Europe, the Middle East and Asia, some in collaborations with other artists.

== Charity and social projects ==
Evgeny actively supports social and charity projects as well as the cultural development of talented children. Participant of the annual charity festival "Towards Dreams". Since 2017, with the support of the association "Child UA" Evgeny held 5 concerts of music therapy for children with autism, cerebral palsy and various psychological disabilities. When Evgeny plays his music — children calm down, relax and enjoy the concerts. Evgeny is an active member and volunteer of the movement "Autism Friendly Space".

In 2013, within the framework of the action "Dream! Act! " for the first time the piano was put on Mikhailovskaya Square in Kyiv, where Evgeny played his well-known world compositions. The project ended with the Ukrainian anthem.

In 2014, played the anthem of Ukraine Sicily in Chicago.

In February 2016, played the anthem of Ukraine at the Gare du nord in Paris.

In 2017 and 2018, concert for children with special needs in the Kyiv Palace of Children and Youth.

In 2019, concert for children with special needs took place at the Kyiv city state administration.

In 2020, the famous composer and pianist Evgeny Khmara together with Child.ua presented an album for children with autism.

== Honours and awards ==
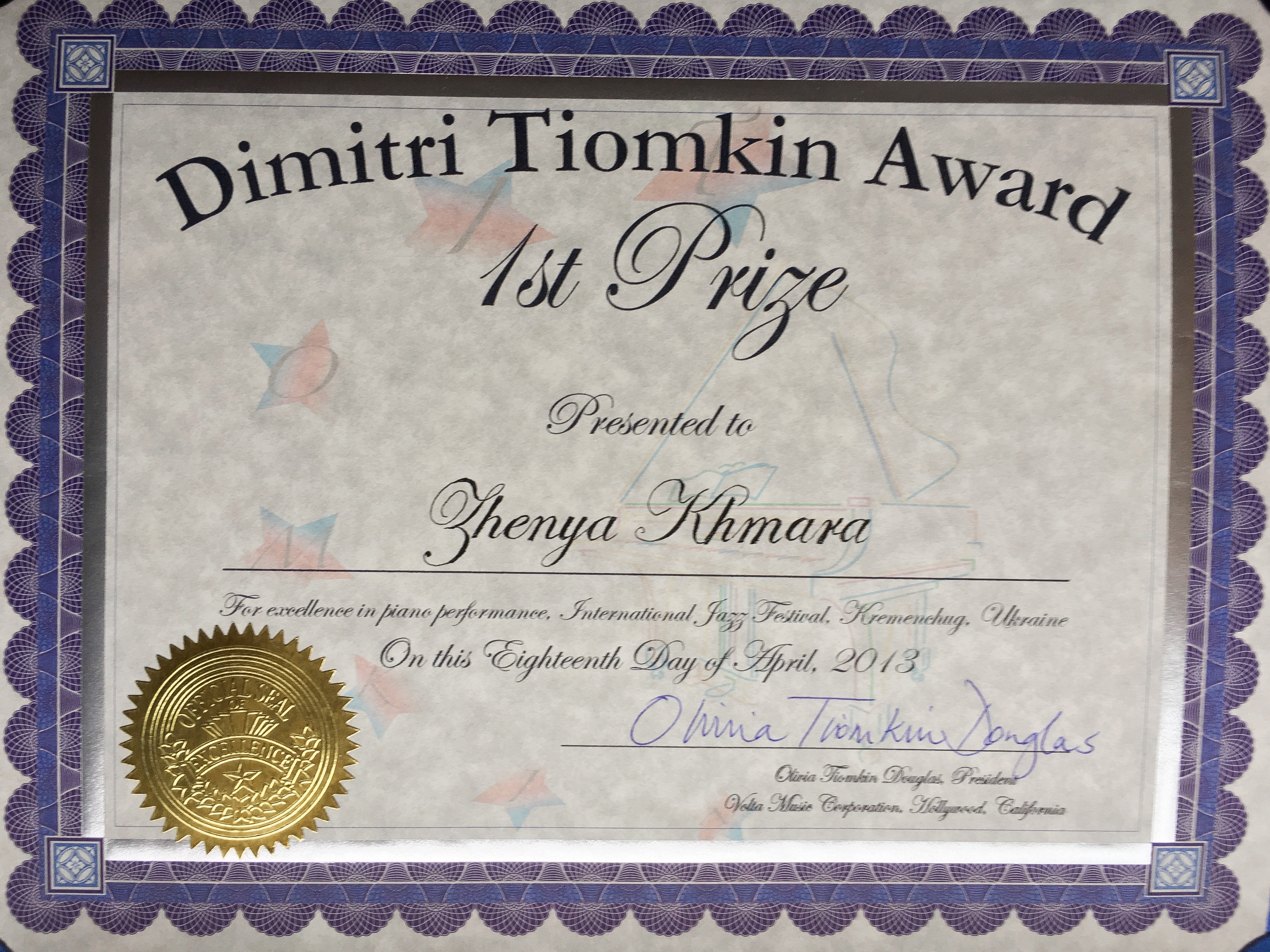
Dimitry Tiomkin Award (2013)

Presidential Award and Scholarship from the Hope and Good Foundation for special achievements in the musical field in 2001. Dimitri Tiomkin Award for excellence in piano performance on 18 April 2013, International Jazz Festival.

2012 - Yamaha Artist

== Musicianship ==
- 2001: Joint to the performance of Didier Marouani (Space) at the "Tavria Games". Performance at the concert of Space called "Symphonic space dream" in the Palace of Ukraine.
- 2004: Performance at the central square in Dnipro with the band Space.
- 2006: Performance at the Kremlin Palace in Moscow at the concert of the Space.
- 2011: Cooperation with Oleg Skrypka in the project "Ukrainian Vechornytsi". Collaboration with singer Sonique.
- 2013: Accompanied to Ukrainian singers Oleg Skripka and Valeria at the show "The Voice of Ukraine".
- 2014: Collaboration with the Italian singer Pupo.
- 2015: In Autumn'15 presentation of the show "Znamenie" (English: The Sign) in Kyiv, in October Palace, with the participation of Didier Marouani.
- 2016: Collaboration with Alessandro Safina as a part of his concert program in Kyiv.
- 2019: Recorded joint single with Kazka, which was presented in April 2019 at the television show "Evening premiere with Katerina Osadchа".

== Discography ==
=== Studio albums ===
- Fairy Tale (2013)
- Znamenie (English: The Sign) (2015)
- White Piano (2016)
- The Wheel of Life (2018)
- Freedom to move (2020)
- Event Horizon (2022)

=== Single ===
- Astral Dreams (2015)
- In The Sky (2020)

== Video Clips ==
- While she slept], release of the debut video clip (2012)
- Magic Clock] (2013)
- Nocturne (2017)
- Tenderness (2017)
- Pianist in the ghost town, video work was filmed in the dead city of Pripyat in the memory of Chernobyl tragedy (2017)
- Congratulations to Ukraine on the 26th anniversary of Independence, video work on the Independence Day of Ukraine (2017)
- Lifeline, video work devoted to the project "Amazing Country" (2018)
- Znamenie and The Wheel of Life was filmed on the territory and in the main building of Igor Sikorsky University, series of video clips shot for the Open Ukraine project (2018)
- Spring fields, video work devoted to the project "Open Ukraine by music" (2019)
- Release, video work made in France at CHÂTEAU DE CHALLAIN-LA-POTHERIE (2019)
- In The Sky, video work shot in the Alps at the height of 2 000 meters above sea (2020)
- Mars planet. The first online concert from the Mars, shot in Petra, Jordan (2021)

== TV Projects ==
In 2012, finalist of TV show Ukraine Got Talent.

In 2013, participation in TV project KUB.

From 2014 to 2018 the musician of the X-Factor.

In 2017, an orchestra evening and solo performance on the X-Factor.

In February 2018, participation in the television show "The Great Spring Concert".

In 2019, participated in the TV show "Evening premiere with Katerina Osadchа" on the 1+1.
