= Service du travail obligatoire =

Forced deportation of French workers, WWII

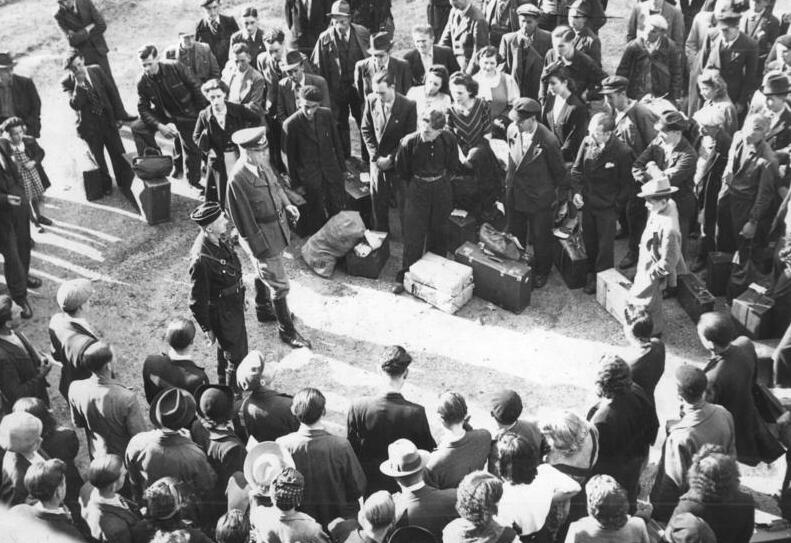
In Paris, French men and women being chosen for work in Germany

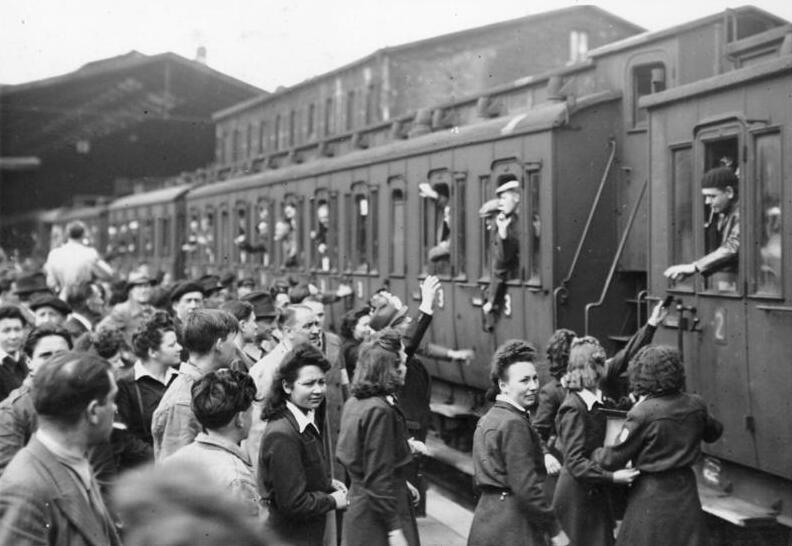
Departure of STO workers from the Paris-Nord station in 1943

The Service du travail obligatoire (STO; lit. 'compulsory work service') was the forced enlistment and deportation of hundreds of thousands of French workers to Nazi Germany to work as forced labour for the German war effort during World War II.

The STO was created under laws and regulations of Vichy France, but it was used by Nazi Germany to compensate for its loss of manpower as it enlisted more and more soldiers for the Eastern Front. The German government promised that for every three French workers sent it would release one French prisoner of war (POW). Those requisitioned under the STO were accommodated in work camps on German soil.

French forced laborers were the only nationality to have been required to serve by the laws of their own state rather than by German orders. This was an indirect consequence of the autonomy negotiated from the German administration by the Vichy government.

A total of 600,000 to 650,000 French workers were sent to Germany between June 1942 and July 1944. France was the third largest source of forced labor, after the USSR and Poland, and was the country that provided the largest number of skilled workers. 250,000 French POWs also had to work for the Reich from 1943 onwards, having been "transformed", voluntarily or involuntarily, into civilian workers.

== History ==
Vichy-era poster calling for volunteers to work in Germany in exchange for French prisoners of war.

=== Relève volunteer work program ===
On 22 June 1942, Pierre Laval, Prime Minister of the Vichy regime, announced the enactment of the relève, whereby French workers were encouraged to volunteer to work in Germany to secure the release of French prisoners of war. One French prisoner of war would be returned in exchange for three volunteer workers from France.

Fritz Sauckel, dubbed the "slavemaster of Europe", was appointed Generalbevollmächtigter für den Arbeitseinsatz (General Plenipotentiary for Labour Deployment) on 21 March 1942 and charged with obtaining labor from across Europe. His appointment was roughly concurrent with the return to power of Pierre Laval. Until that time less than 100,000 French volunteers had gone to work in Germany. The refusal to send 150,000 skilled workers was one of the causes of the fall of the Darlan government.

Under the Relève program, 80,000 French POWs were released, with 240,000 French workers heading to Germany as part of the exchange.

=== Sauckel actions ===
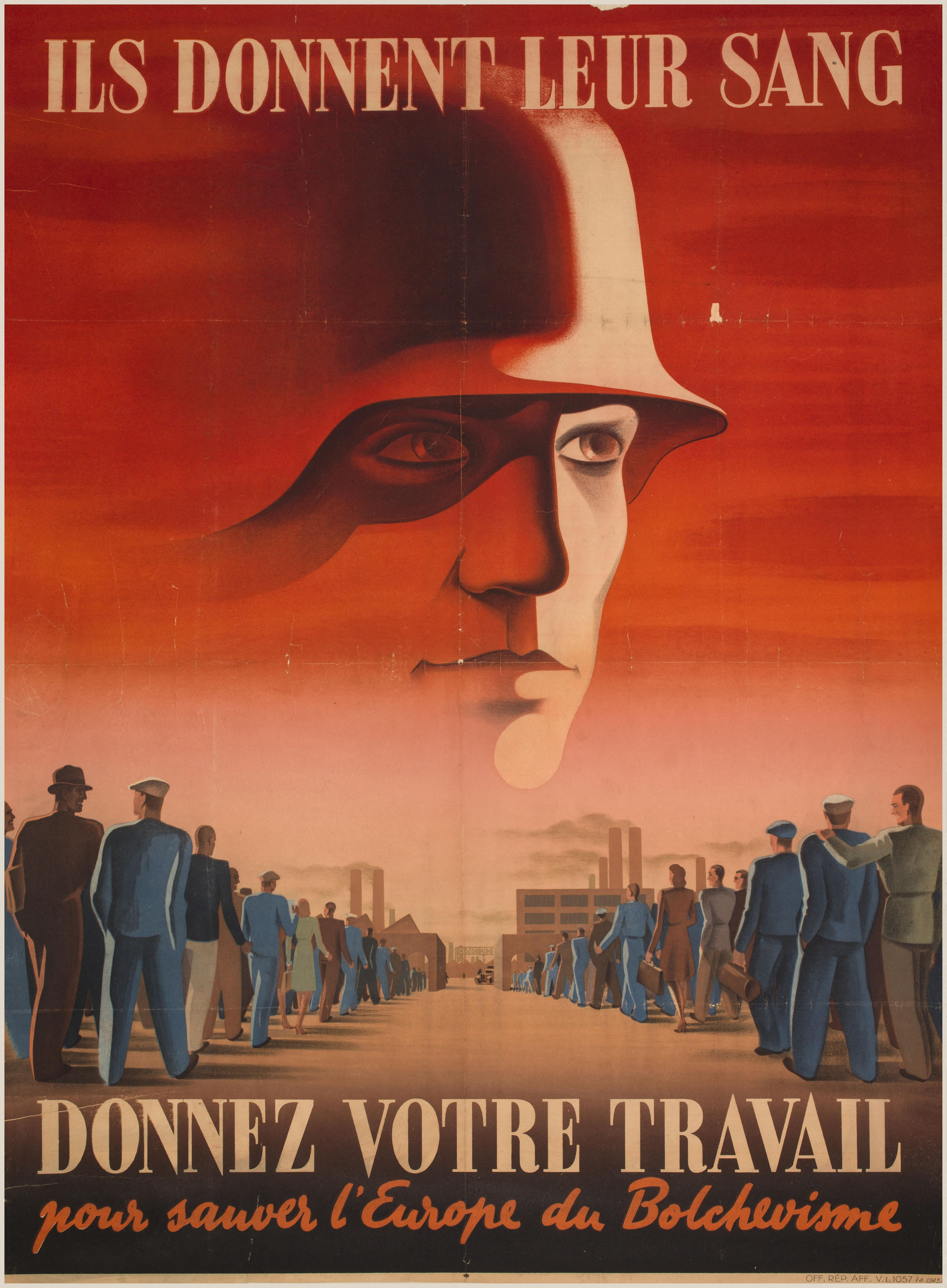
Propaganda poster: "They give their blood. Give your work to save Europe from Bolshevism."

In 1942 and 1943, Sauckel used intimidation and threats to meet his objectives. Laval negotiated, procrastinated and complied in turn, so that relations between the two men were tumultuous, Sauckel alternately praising Laval for his cooperation or condemning him for obstruction. Sauckel's increasing labor requirements between spring 1942 and early 1944 were known as "actions Sauckel" (Sauckel actions).

The law of 4 September 1942, signed by Philippe Pétain, Marshal of France and Chief of State of Vichy France, and Laval, was entitled "loi du 4 septembre 1942 relative à l'utilisation et à l'orientation de la main-d'œuvre" or "Law of 4 September 1942 on the use and guidance of the workforce". It required all able-bodied men aged 18 to 50 and single women aged 21 to 35 to "be subject to do any work that the Government deems necessary".

After Hitler ordered, on 15 December 1942, the transfer to the Wehrmacht of 300,000 German workers, Sauckel required, on 1 January 1943, in addition to the 240,000 French workers already in Germany, a further quota of 250,000 men to be dispatched by mid-March. To satisfy this second "action Sauckel", the law of 16 February 1943, signed by Prime Minister Laval for Joseph Barthélemy, the Minister of Justice, deemed it necessary that all males over 20 be subject to the service du travail obligatoire.

=== Conscription ===
Regulations - issued the same day - subjected males born between 1920 and 1922, roughly all males between the ages of 20 and 23, to the service. Previous requisitions under the relève theoretically concerned only workers. With the introduction of the STO, recruitment would henceforth be made by whole age groups. Young people in the classes of "1940", "1941" and "1942" (born between 1920 and 1922) were obliged to go to work in Germany (or France) as a substitute for military service. The Class of "1942" was the most affected and exemptions or suspensions initially promised to farmers or students were removed in June 1943. Theoretically, the STO also applied to young women but, for fear of the reactions of the people and the Church, women were not generally called up. Those called up in the second "action Sauckel" included 24,000 young men of the Chantiers de la jeunesse française the uniformed organization for young men that replaced military service in France between 1940 and 1944. These provided the last contingent of the "1942" class.

=== 1943 ===
A third "action Sauckel" followed: On April 23, 1943, the Germans made new demands for 120,000 workers in May and another 100,000 in June. On August 6, 1943, they demanded an additional 500,000. These goals were never achieved because increasingly potential conscripts evaded the requisitions. The STO caused the departure into hiding of nearly 200,000 and of these about one quarter became full-time members of the French resistance.

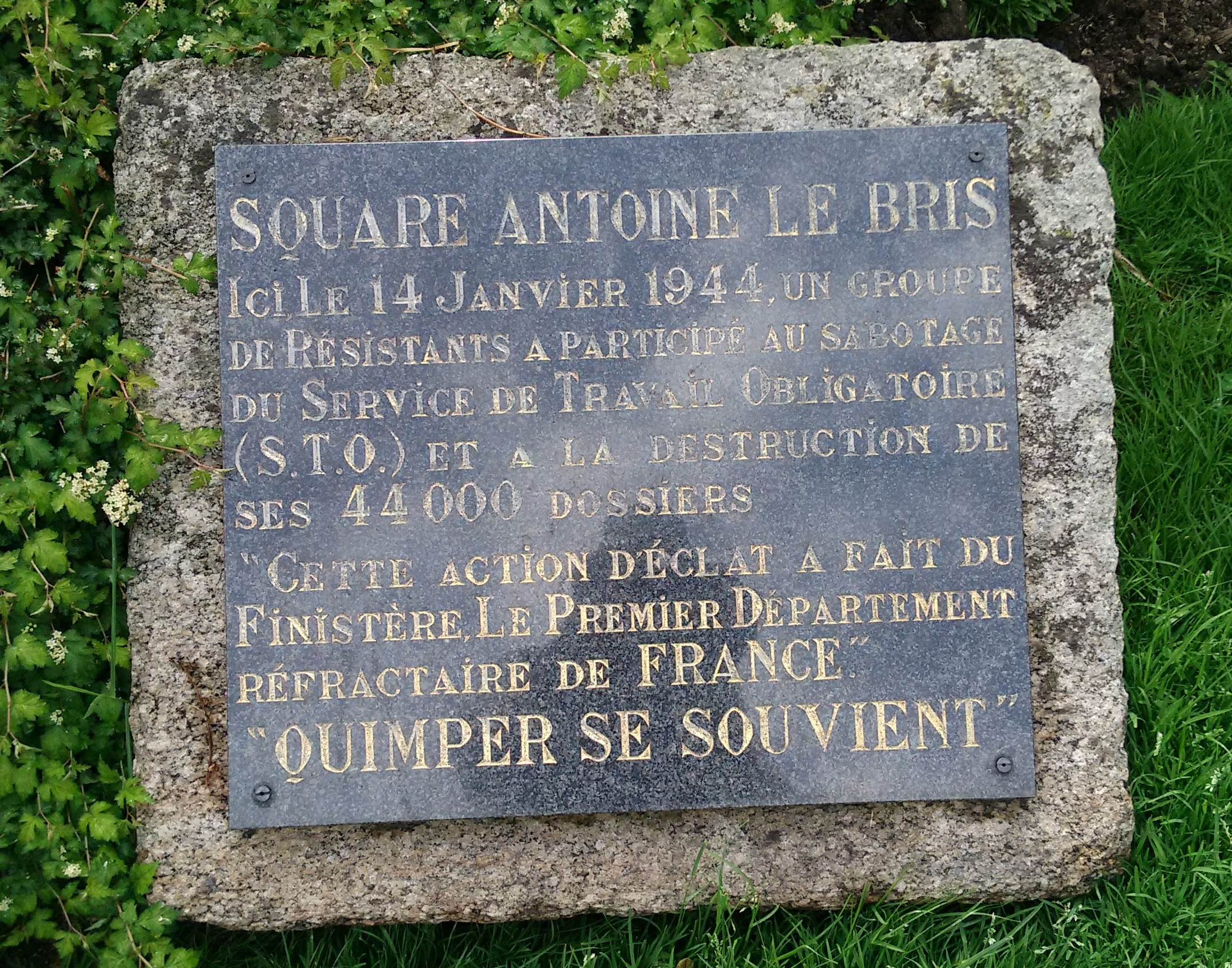
Plaque in Quimper commemorating a January 1944 act of sabotage against the STO office in which 44,000 files were destroyed.

Finally it was the Germans themselves who put an end to the demands of Sauckel. On 15 September 1943 the Reich Minister of Armaments and War Production Albert Speer concluded an agreement with Vichy government minister Jean Bichelonne exempting many French companies working for Germany from Sauckel's requisitions. However, this meant that the French economy increasingly became integrated with that of Germany.

=== 1944 ===
Sauckel continued his labor levies, formally in parallel with the new policy of Speer, but the fourth "Sauckel Action" launched in 1944 turned out to be unproductive in obtaining additional workers.

The STO accentuated the movement of French public opinion against the Vichy regime and contributed to the Resistance. But it also brought the latter a task of considerable magnitude: to find money, food, weapons, etc. for thousands of young men who suddenly flocked to the resistance. STO conscripts also formed the first among 35,000 who escaped from France to North Africa to join the Free French or the French Liberation Army.

== Partial list of former STO workers ==
- André Bergeron
- René Binet
- Antoine Blondin
- Auguste Boncors
- Maurice-Philippe Bouchard
- Jean Boudou
- Georges Brassens
- José Cabanis
- Marcel Callo
- François Cavanna
- Arthur Conte
- Henri Delandre
- Raymond Devos
- Michel Galabru
- Marcel Guyerie
- Pierre Havart
- Marcel Heuzé
- Stéphane Just
- Boby Lapointe
- Roger (Paul) le Ber
- Eugene Lemoine
- Jean Mariol
- Claude Ollier
- Pierre de Porcaro
- Slimane Azem
- Ouali Azem
- Alain Robbe-Grillet
- André Tissier
- Emilio Chiarandini

== See also ==
- Coming home to liberated France (World War II)
- Foundation Remembrance, Responsibility and Future
