= Georges-Robert Lefort =

French architect

- Plaque on a building on Rue du Marechal Foch, Guingamp, France
- Born: 27 February 1875; Paris, France
- Died: December 1954 (aged 79)
- Occupation: Architect

Georges-Robert Lefort (27 February 1875 – December 1954) was a French architect. At least three of his works have been designated national historical monuments.

== Birth and education ==
Georges-Robert Lefort was born on 27 February 1875 in Paris. His father was employed by the Crédit Foncier de France. He obtained a bachelor's degree in science, then studied architecture under François Goemans from 1895 to 1896. He was admitted to the École des Beaux-Arts of Paris, where he was a pupil of Edmond Jean Baptiste Paulin. He won several prizes and medals between 1899 and 1903.

== Career ==
Lefort settled in Guingamp at the start of the 20th century, and was to become the leading architect in Brittany. He was appointed architect for the town of Rennes in 1910. Between 1923 and 1942 he was architect for the Historical Monuments department of the Ministry of Culture. From 1923 to 1934 he was a professor at the École Régionale des Beaux-Arts, Rennes, and from 1935 to 1947 he was a director of this school. He was actively involved in associations such as the Syndicat des architectes du Nord-Ouest and the Association provinciale des architectes français. Lefort died in December 1954 at the age of 79.

== Selected works ==
Lefort designed many buildings in Brittany. His work was varied in style. The hospital in Guingamp was severely neo-classical, while the Saint-Brieuc savings bank was richly eclectic. He also drew on the local Breton architectural tradition, which he found an important source of inspiration.

His works include:

Year	Work	Location	Notes
1909	Savings bank	Saint-Brieuc	Designated a historical monument in 1995
1909	"Lan Kerellec" vacation home	Trébeurden	A large vacation home designed for the painter Pierre Gervais by the architects Louis Süe and Paul Huillard. Lefort monitored construction.
1924	Grand Beach Hotel	Perros-Guirec	A major extension to an existing beachfront hotel building, built in two stages in 1914 and in 1924–26. The hotel has since been extensively modified.
1924	War memorial	Guingamp	Designed by Lefort with a sculpture group by Hippolyte Galy.
1932	Gare de Dinan	Dinan	Dinan railway station. Designated a historical monument in 1995
1928	Grand Seminary	Saint-Brieuc	Built between 1924 and 1928 in reinforced concrete and granite chips. The chapel has an art deco style, with mosaics by Isidore Odorico. Designated a historical monument in 1995
1947	"Kestellic" vacation home	Plouguiel	A vacation home built for the entrepreneur Désiré Offret.

== Bibliography ==
- Lefort, Georges-Robert (1957). Le Mont Saint-Michel: vu par un architecte. Avec des illustrations de l'auteur, gravées par Georges Beltrand... Impr. du Compagnonnage.
