= Titanic (Norwegian band) =

Norwegian band (1969–2014)

Titanic was a rock band active from 1969 to 2014. Its members came from Norway and Britain.

== Career ==
The group formed in Norway in 1969. Its members were Kenny Aas (organ & bass guitar) (born Kjell Olav Aas, 1947), Kjell Asperud (percussion & vocal), John Lorck (drums), Janne Løseth (guitar & vocal) Roy Robinson (lead singer) and John Williamson (bass & guitar). Janne Løseth was the band's primary songwriter and Roy Robinson its main lyricist.

In October 1971, Titanic reached Number 5 in the UK Singles Chart, with their instrumental track, "Sultana" in the style of Santana.

The band relocated to the south of France and released Macumba in 1973 with Helge Groslie on keyboards. It reached number one in Spain. Sliding Down Again was released in 1974 and Buckshee Woman the following year.

The band dissolved in 1979. Janne Løseth started a solo career, releasing singles including "Take Me Down" (bw. "Nobody's Man"), and "I Wished I Was a Poet" (bw. "Dancing Girl"), which featured his operatic vocal, and then became the lead singer for the French electronic band Space, best known for its 1977 album and single Magic Fly.

In 1991, Løseth and Robinson reformed Titanic and recorded the album Lower the Atlantic. The album was re-released as Heart of Rock in 1993. This Titanic reunion was short lived.

In 2006, Løseth reformed Titanic with three additional members: Mick Walker, Phil Wilton, and Didier Blum. Roy Robinson later joined and this quintet released the single "I'm the Law" in the same year. Their album Ashes and Diamonds was released on 20 February 2009 in Europe.

In late 2009, Robinson sustained a stroke and left the band to recover. Løseth assumed the lead vocals. Robinson and Walker were replaced by new members Chris Kleiner and Jean-Pierre Sjoberg. They played live concerts until 2013. During their latter days the band was located in Switzerland. In September 2014, it was announced that the band was discontinued.

Original singer Roy B. Robinson (born 31 December 1945) died on 8 June 2015. The band's founder Janne Løseth (born Janne Geir Løseth, July 8, 1947) died on 4 September 2019.

== Discography ==
=== Albums ===
- Titanic, 1970, CBS Records
- Sea Wolf, 1970, CBS Records
- Eagle Rock, 1973, CBS Records
- Ballad of a Rock 'N Roll Loser, 1975, CBS Records
- Return of Drakkar, 1977, Egg Records
- Eye of the Hurricane, 1979, Egg Records
- Lower the Atlantic, 1993, Metal Enterprises (also released in France as Heart of Rock on New Disc Records)
- Ashes and Diamonds, 2008, Repertoire Records

=== Singles ===
- "Sultana"/"Sing Fool Sing", 1970, CBS
- "Rain 2000", 1972, CBS Holland
- "Half Breed/Santa Fé", 1973, CBS France SSP12001
- "Richmond Express", 1973, CBS France
- "Macumba", 1973, CBS Spain
- "Slideing Down Again", 1974, CBS France
- "Buckshee Woman", 1975, CBS France
- "Dance Baby Dance (Frisco Queen)" / "Hollywood (Oh La La)", 1979, Ariola, 107014 - Netherlands
- "Iceberg"

== Literature ==
- Tom Hermann Kristensen: Titanic. Historien – fortalt av dem selv. Rockarkivet. 171 pp. ill. Oslo 2008. ISBN 978-82-997310-2-7
