= Coming home to liberated France (World War II) =

Almost 2 million French citizens present in Nazi Germany near the end of the war in 1945 were repatriated. The returnees included more than one million prisoners of war (POWs) captured when France was defeated by German in 1940, 600,000 or more workers, both male and female, some of whom had volunteered but more who were coerced into working in Germany during the war, and 200,000 political deportees made up mostly of resisters to the German occupation of France and French Jews. A French ministry was created to assist the returnees, but was overwhelmed by the numbers. Aid to the returnees, many in poor physical and mental condition, was inadequate. The POWs suffered from the stigma of having lost the war and being taken prisoner. The returning workers were regarded by some as being collaborators with the Germans. The survivors among the political deportees, many of whom had died or been killed during their captivity, were honored on their return to France, but soon found themselves mostly forgotten or ignored, lower in the pantheon of heroes than those who were or claimed to have been in the French Resistance.

The post-war French government of Charles de Gaulle proclaimed unity and took a stance, not accurate, of claiming that all French citizens sacrificed equally during the war and that the majority had resisted the German occupation. Many returnees believed that their sacrifices were greater and they did not receive the honor and the resources they deserved. The returnees also competed among themselves for resources.

== Background ==
Nazi Germany defeated France in June 1940 and occupied the country. Allied armies invaded France on 6 June 1944 and captured Paris on 25 August and Lyon on 3 September, thus expelling the German army from most of the country and enabling the creation of an independent French government under Charles de Gaulle. Parts of France, however, remained under German occupation until the end of the war in Europe on 8 May 1945.

France had a population of 40 million people in 1940. Of that total almost two million French men and women prisoners or workers were in Germany near the end of the war. They were called "Absents". There were three categories of Absents in Germany. First, Germany had taken about 1.8 million French soldiers as prisoners of war in 1940. It repatriated some of the POWs and a few died. In 1945 one to 1.2 million remained in Germany either in POW camps or in work brigades. Second, six to seven hundred thousand French workers were in Germany. Labor-short Germany had recruited a few and forced many French men and a few women to reside and work in Germany, mostly in factories. Third, during the war, the Germans arrested and deported to concentration camps 220,000 people in France, including 80,000 "racial deportees" (mostly Jews), 40,000 foreign Jews, and 100,000 political prisoners. Two hundred and twenty-two thousand of the workers and deportees are estimated to have died or were killed in Germany, leaving 600,000 to 700,000 workers and political deportees who returned to France.

In 1944, in addition to the POWs, workers, and imprisoned people in Germany, hundreds of thousand of French were displaced from their homes as a result of the war and the wreckage of homes and cities that it caused. Some had been displaced since the German invasion in 1940; others had been displaced more recently by Allied bombing and the dangers of being caught between the warring armies of the Allies and the Germans after the Normandy invasion on 6 June 1944. "Refugee fatigue" set in as some communities were forced to accommodate large numbers of people fleeing the war. Some Departments saw their population swell by more than 15 percent from 1939 to 1946 while others (mostly in the east and northeast) lost an equivalent number of people. As France was reconquered in 1944 and 1945, many of the displaced people ventured back to what remained of their former homes. Also in France were more than 100,000 refugees of 47 different nationalities.

The French economy was in poor condition at the end of the war. The estimated Gross Domestic Product (GDP) decreased from $199 billion in 1939 to $101 billion in 1944 (1990 dollars). The Germans forced France to export 15 to 20 percent of its wheat, butter, and meat production to Germany and to pay the costs of the German occupation. By 1944, the French official food ration was a near-starvation 1,050 calories per day. Some city-dwellers were able to supplement this ration by resorting to the black market or establishing trading connections with farmers. Urban vegetable gardens flourished in parks, yards, and on apartment balconies. The rural population fared reasonably well during the occupation, but urban dwellers suffered food shortages and dietary deficiencies. France had limited resources to resettle the returnees from Germany and competition for those resources was intense and sometimes violent.

Most of the returnees returned to France in April and May 1945, some arriving in Paris by railway, up to a five day journey from Germany given the damages to the transportation infrastructure. After the German surrender, the Americans devoted many of their transport aircraft to transporting the Absents to Paris.

== Reception ==
The newly-created Ministry of Prisoners, Deportees, and Refugees (MPDR), headed by Henri Frenay, was in charge of aiding the "Absents" returning to France. The initial response was to treat all returnees the same, ignoring the different experiences of the POWs, the workers, and the deportees, most of whom had survived in concentration camps. The Ministry had the policy of "shared sacrifice" among all French citizens, returnees or not, and initially did not distinguish between the varying and special needs of the different returnees.

The MPDR received returnees in many "Prisoner's Houses" (Maisons du prisonniers) scattered around France. In Paris, the returnees usually arrived by train or bus at the Gare de Lyon or the Gare d'Orsay (railroad stations) by train or truck. Processing of incoming returnees usually took place at the Hôtel Lutetia, the Prisoner's House in Paris. The Letetia was surrounded by relatives looking for news of their absent family members or hoping they had arrived. Returnees were screened, given a health check up, a small amount of money, a train ticket (coach class) to their home, and the address of a Prisoner's House near their home. The reception process took an average of 70 minutes per returnee.

The anticipated orderly process turned out to be anything but orderly. Many returnees came back to France by their own means and arrived at the Prisoner's Houses unexpectedly, overwhelming the facilities. It quickly became apparent that many of the returnees had physical and health problems and needed financial assistance. Aid was inadequate. For example, no provision had been made to provide clothing to the prisoners and many had to suffer the humiliation of traveling to their homes "wearing the tattered remains of the striped prison uniforms." The "one size fits all" policy of the MPDR was inadequate.

== Prisoners of war ==
The Vichy French government collaborated with the Germans during World War II and portrayed the POWs as victims of the previous French government. The POWs were described as suffering for the sins of France, but in solidarity with the Vichy government's aims to remake French society. Vichy propaganda trumpeted the spirit of the POWs and the image of the monastic and communal environment of the POW camps, but rarely mentioned that 93 percent of the French POWs were members of labor brigades rather than living in the camps. This idealistic portrayal of the lives of the POWs proved to be counter productive as many people in France came to believe that the POWs were suffering less hardship than they were under Vichy and the German occupation, thus engendering less sympathy for the POWs rather than more. Added to that was the stigma of the POWs having been defeated and captured. Napoleon allegedly said that a good French soldier will die rather than allow himself to be captured.

The post-occupation French government, by contrast, extolled the heroes of the French resistance to the German occupation. In what has been called the "Gaullist myth", the government portrayed the French public in the heroic stance of being united in its resistance to the Germans. The heroes were the resisters, especially the political deportees returning from concentration camps. The POWs found their reception indifferent when they returned home. Honor of veterans was a French tradition and the returning POWs believed they were being short-changed. Their dissatisfaction broke out in a protest in Paris on 18 May 1945 by hundreds of POWs demanding health care. On 2 June thousands more protested, demanding that they be given ration points so they could obtain civilian clothing. They added a demand for the resignation of Frenay, the minister of the MPDR. The returning POWs quickly became aware that they were receiving fewer benefits from the government than the political deportees to concentration camps. Adding insult to injury, the POWs were not granted the benefits and pensions of other veterans of military service.

== Workers ==
The POWs were disappointed at the paucity of the honor accorded them on their return. The hundreds of thousands of civilian workers who returned to France from Germany received no honor at all. Germany and Vichy France initially tried to recruit workers for Germany by promising that one POW would be freed to come home for every three volunteers to work in Germany. The Germans also extolled the working conditions in Germany, including good pay, vacations, and abundant food. Few French men and women responded to this appeal. In late 1942, Vichy enacted the Service du Travail Obligatoire (Obligatory Work Service) or STO which required French men and women to give two years of service to the war effort. Between March 1942 and March 1944, more than 600,000 men and women were conscripted or volunteered and were sent to work in Germany in factories and on farms. Thousands of the workers were killed by Allied bombing or died of mistreatment and overwork. As Germany was overrun by Allied armies in early 1945, these workers began returning to France.

In the fractured society of France between resistants (and those claiming to be resistants) and collaborators with the Germans (and those accused of collaboration), the returning workers fell more into the category of collaborators, not withstanding that the majority of the returning STO workers had been involuntarily conscripted to work in Germany. In some departments of France, they received less assistance on their return than did POWs and deportees.

== Political deportees ==
Of the more than 200,000 political deportees, as many as 60 percent died or were killed in German concentration camps. Casualties among this group were much higher than among the POWs and the workers. Jews suffered the most, percentage wise, among the political deportees. Of the more than 75,000 Jews among the political deportees, only a few thousand survived.

The political deportees received the most honor on their return. They were exemplars of the government's glorification and magnification of the resistance against the German occupation. Charles de Gaulle headed a delegation to receive the first women repatriated from the concentration camps on 14 April 1945. The delegation was shocked at the appearance of the women. The French Ministry of Prisoners, Deportees, and Refugees "had been trying to suppress information about the camps" (while, at the same time, American General Dwight D. Eisenhower was doing the opposite). In another incident, observers saw hundreds of emaciated male returnees at a reception center in Paris who had been stripped naked and dusted with powder and DDT for delousing and prevention of typhus.

In impoverished France, the returning political deportees were given money, food, and clothing beyond what the other returnees received. They were received with local celebrations and much greater enthusiasm than the other returnees, but were soon forgotten. "Their physical presence," said historian Koreman, "made it quite clear that some French men and women had suffered extraordinarily for France's liberation while others had profited from the occupation." The heroes of the German occupation were the members of resistance groups in France. The returning political deportees contradicted the Gaullist myth of "shared sacrifice" among all French citizens. Some, especially the French Jews and other political deportees, had sacrificed much more than others.

== Aftermath ==
The feeling that the de Gaulle government was ignoring the plight of the returnees and their contributions to the war effort was characterized by novelist Marguerite Duras: "De Gaulle doesn't talk about the concentration camps; it's blatant the way he doesn't talk about them, the way he's clearly reluctant to credit the people's suffering with a share in the victory for fear of lessening his own role and the influence that derives from it.

Among the three kinds of returnees there was less feeling of solidarity than of competition. STO workers in one place complained that they received only three months food while POW's and political returnees received six months of food. In another place, political returnees complained that POWs were getting a larger coal ration than they were. Efforts to unite the returnees failed as they fragmented into groups, each group seeking both material benefits and honor for its members. Political deportees created the National Federation of Patriotic Deportees and Internees, but that organization was too inclusive for some. They created the National Federation of Deportees and Internees of the Resistance to exclude communists and those they judged had not done enough for the resistance. On their part the STO workers set up organizations to advocate for the needs and wants of their membership.

The ex-POWs were the best organized. They joined the already-existing National Movement of Prisoners of War and Deportees (MNPGD in French). Their spokesman was an ex-POW and future president, François Mitterrand. Over a decade of effort, the WW II POWs achieved near-equality with other military veterans. The few surviving Jewish deportees had to wait until the 1970s before their unique experience as part of the Holocaust was recognized by the French government.

== See also ==
- Malgré-nous
