= Pierre de Porcaro =

French Roman Catholic priest

Abbé Pierre de Porcaro
- Born: August 1904; Dinan, France
- Died: 12 March 1945 (aged 40); Dachau, Germany
- Occupation: Catholic priest

The Abbé Pierre de Porcaro (French pronunciation: [pjɛʁ də pɔʁkaʁɔ]; August 1904 – 12 March 1945) was a French Roman Catholic priest who worked as an undercover minister during the Second World War. He was eventually captured by the Nazis and died in Dachau concentration camp.

== Life ==
=== Early life ===
Pierre de Porcaro was born to a long-established Breton family in Dinan, Brittany, in August 1904. He was ordained to the priesthood at Versailles in 1929, and worked at the seminary there as a master of Roman history. In 1935 he became the vicar of Saint-Germain-en-Laye, outside Paris, where he was particularly known for his work with Catholic youth groups.

=== The Second World War ===
De Porcaro was called up when war broke out in 1939, and he was captured, along with the rest of his unit, during the Battle for France in June 1940. He was originally sent to Stalag IX-B as a prisoner of war, but was subsequently released as "clean" in August 1941. Returning to Saint-Germain, he continued his work as a local priest until 1943, when the Bishop of Versailles, Monsignor Roland-Gosselin, asked him to travel to Germany and minister clandestinely to French forced labourers. Catholic priests were under great danger in Germany, but de Porcaro accepted the mission, writing:

Yes, my God, I accept everything with all possible generosity – everything, including dying for [this mission], dying in a foreign land, far from everything, far from everyone. [...] I believe I am on the right path, for all this leaves me feeling very calm, I feel a great peace mixed with I don't know what kind of higher joy.

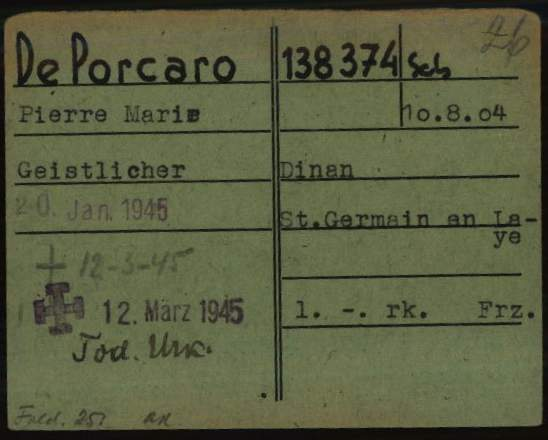
Registration card of Pierre de Porcaro as a prisoner at Dachau Nazi Concentration Camp

Accepting the mission, he travelled to Germany as part of the Service du travail obligatoire programme, by which Vichy France provided thousands of French workers to Nazi Germany as forced labour. De Porcaro worked at a cardboard factory in Dresden during the day, and pursued his ministry by night, when he held popular masses in secret, with the complicity of a local German priest. He wore a special scouting belt around his waist as a sign to other French workers that he was secretly a priest. His cover was blown, though, after a written denunciation by a fellow Frenchman, and he was arrested in September 1944, and eventually, in January 1945, sent to Dachau concentration camp, where he was interned in a block filled with other Catholic priests.

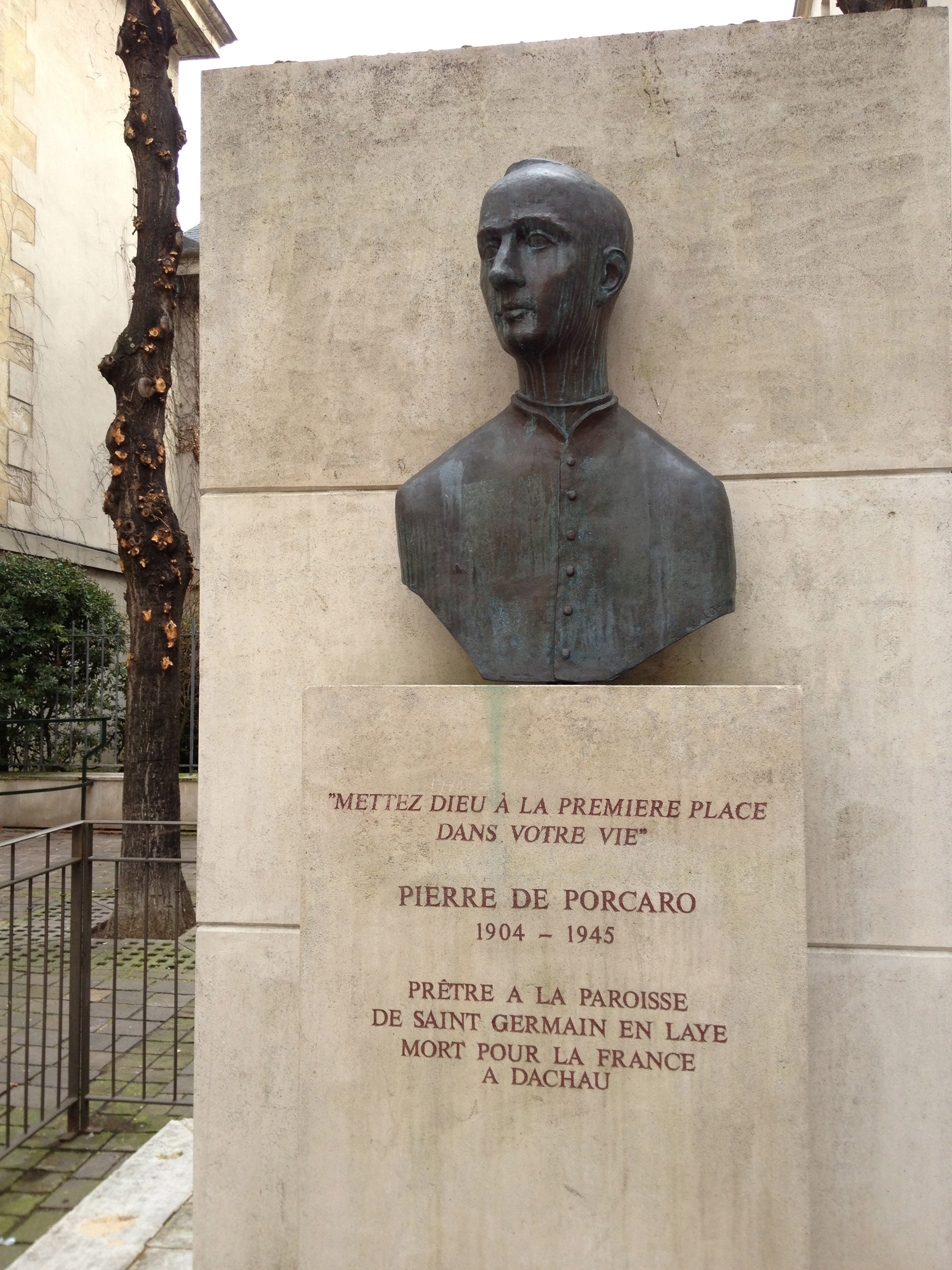
A commemorative statue of Pierre de Porcaro in Saint-Germain-en-Laye

=== Death ===
Conditions in the camp were deteriorating at this point in the war, and disease was a serious problem. De Porcaro contracted typhus in February (almost certainly from ministering to sick Frenchmen in the camp), and ultimately died of the disease on 12 March 1945, just over a month before the camp was liberated by the American army.

== Legacy ==
The seminary buildings of Versailles are named after him (the Maisons Pierre de Porcaro), and the current bishop of Versailles, Monsignor Éric Aumonier, has initiated plans to have de Porcaro beatified. There is also a commemorative statue of him in Saint-Germain-en-Laye.

The 13th of December 2025, he is declared Blessed with 49 others martyrs in Notre-Dame cathedral of Paris. https://www.catholique78.fr/2025/06/26/pierre-de-porcaro-un-nouveau-bienheureux-pour-les-yvelines/
