= Dinan station =

Railway station in Dinan, France

Dinan
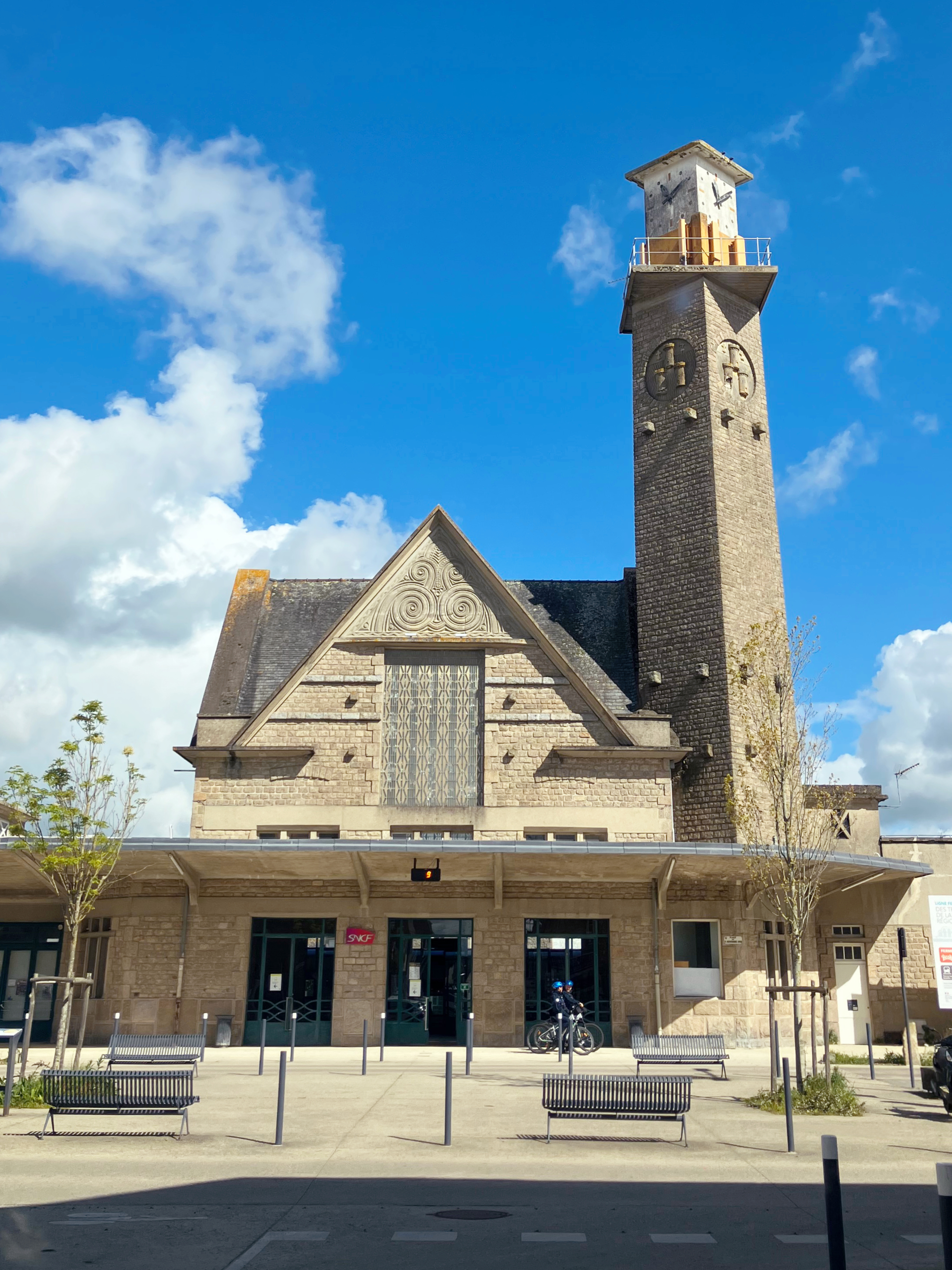

General information
- Location: Place du 11 Novembre 1918; 22100 Dinan; Côtes-d'Armor; France
- Coordinates: 48.456846°N 2.053533°W
- Elevation: 76 metres (249 ft)
- Owner: SNCF
- Operator: SNCF
- Lines: Lison to Lamballe; La Brohinière to Dinan; Dinan to Dinard-Saint-Énogat
- Platforms: 2

Other information
- Station code: 87478164

Services
Preceding station	TER Bretagne	Following station
Corseul-Languenan towards Saint-Brieuc	24	La Hisse towards Dol-de-Bretagne
Route map
Location

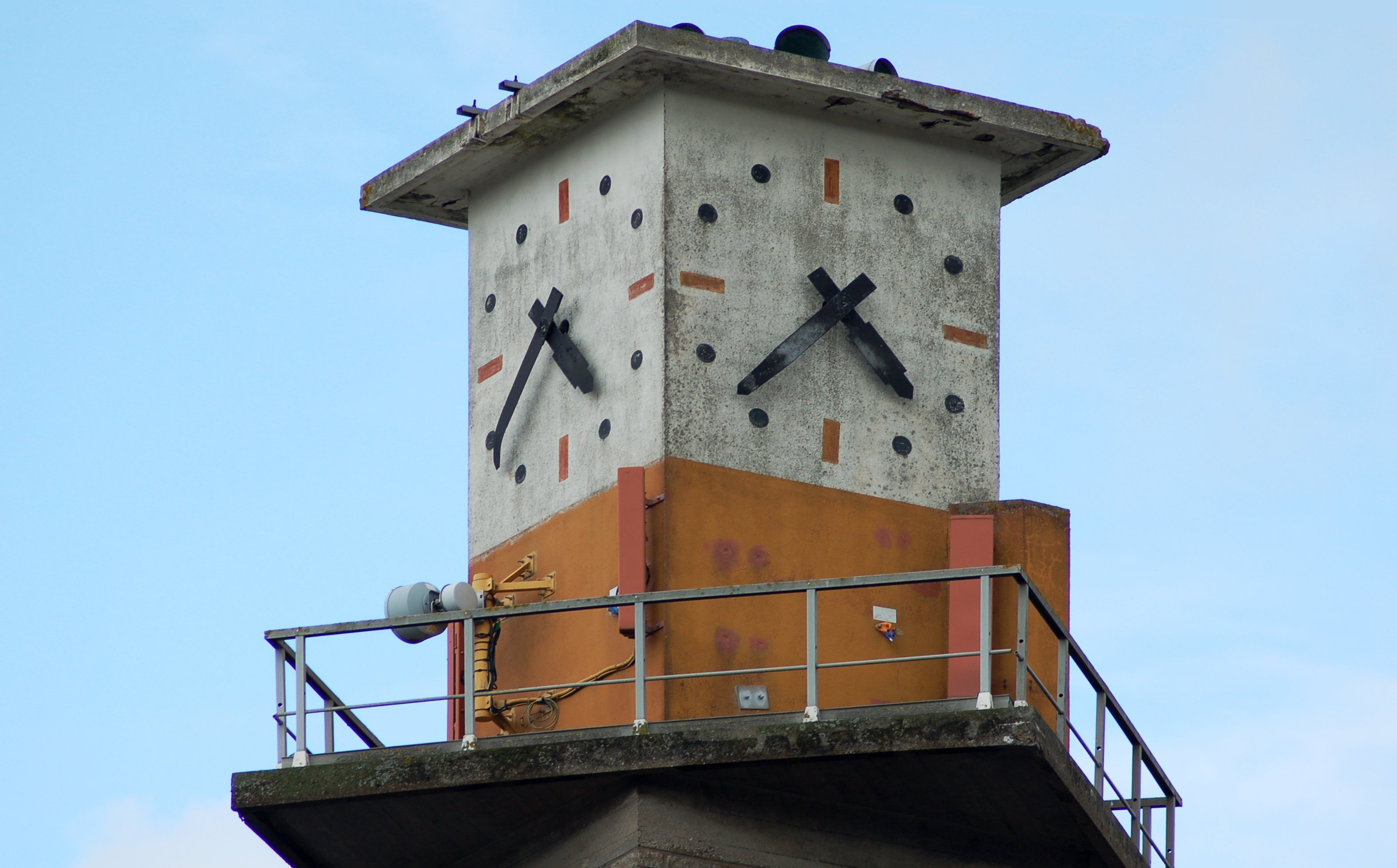
Dinan station clock tower.

Dinan station (French: Gare de Dinan; Breton: Ti-gar Dinan) is a French railway station on the Lison to Lamballe line, in the town of Dinan, Côtes-d'Armor, Brittany. It has included a railway museum since 1991. The station was opened in 1879 by the Western Railways Company. It is now a station of the SNCF, served by trains operated by TER Bretagne.

== Network location ==
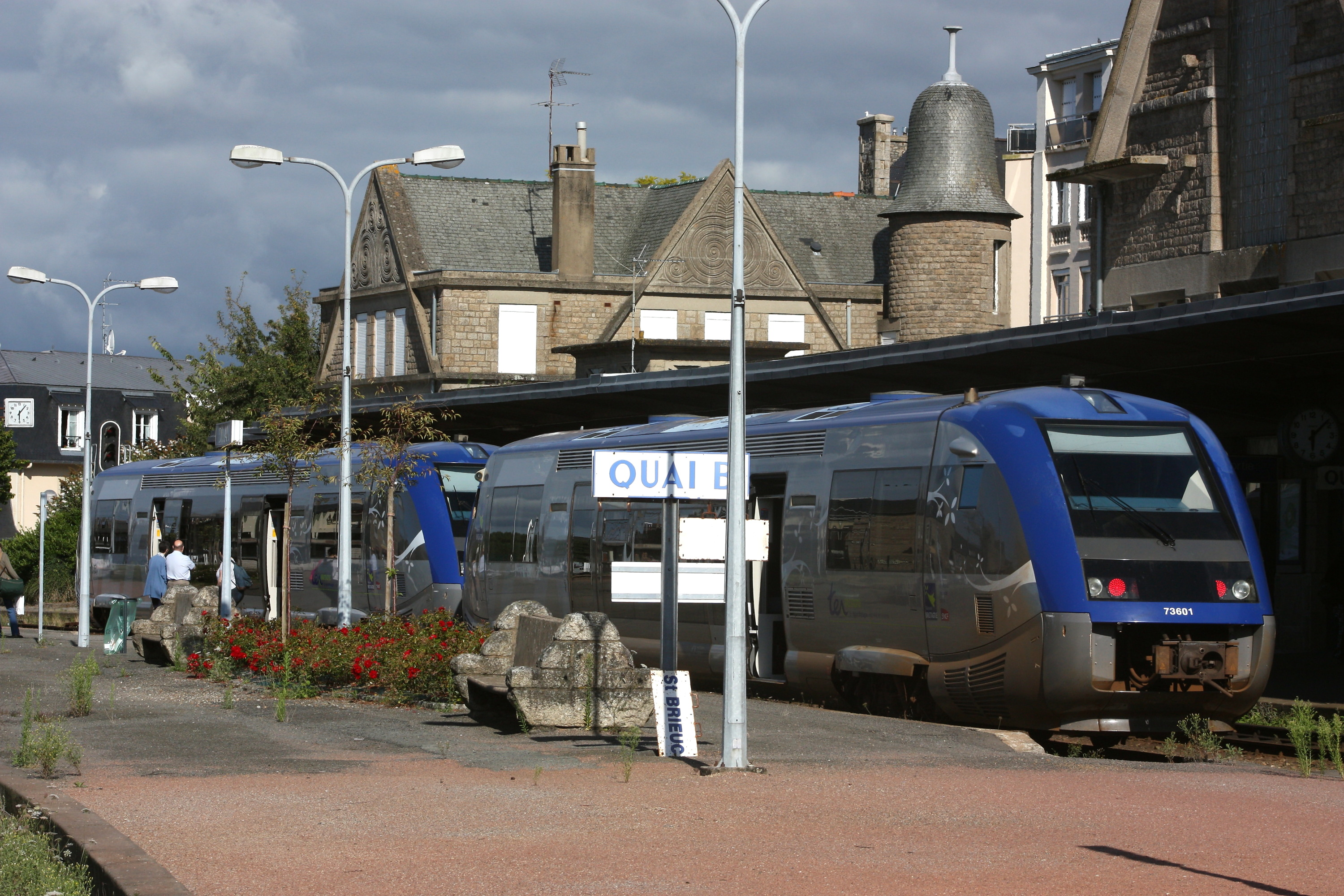
Two X 73500 railcars in the station, serving the Dol-de-Bretagne route.

The station is at an altitude of 76 metres (249 ft). It is at kilometer point (KP) 169.940 of the Lison to Lamballe line, between the Hisse and Corseul stations. It was at the start of lines to Saint-Énogat and La Brohinière, both of which were closed in the 1990s.

== History ==
The single-track section from Dol-de-Bretagne to Lamballe, on which is Dinan is located, was commissioned on 29 December 1879 by the Western Railway Company. The present station dates from 1931, and was designed by Georges-Robert Lefort. It was part of the construction program launched by Raoul Dautry, general manager of the state railway administration, to renovate several of the company's stations. Inside the hall there are two mosaics. One is a map of the railways in the region, and the other is a map of the town of Dinan. These mosaics have been registered as historical monuments since 21 November 1995.

== Services ==
The station has a building with open ticket windows every day except Sunday and is also equipped with ticket vending machines.

Dinan is served by TER Bretagne trains that terminate or originate in the station. Trains come from or go to Dol-de-Bretagne on one side (TER line 17), or Saint-Brieuc on the other side (TER line 24). Some of the trains go on to, or come from, Lannion or Guingamp. There is only one round trip per day that does not end in this station, between Dol-de-Bretagne and Saint-Brieuc. The station was served by a direct express train from Paris until 27 September 1986.

== Connections ==
There is a parking lot.

The station is served by three road networks:

- Lines 1 and 2 of the Dinan urban bus (Dinanbus)
- Coaches of the Tibus departmental network on the following lines:
  - No 10 between Saint-Malo and Dinan
  - No 11 between Dinan and Taden
  - No 17 between Dinan and Montauban-de-Bretagne
- Coaches of the ILLENOO departmental network between Rennes and Dinard.

== Museum ==
The Railway Museum was opened in the station in 1991. It is managed by the Dinan Railway Society, and present the history of the regional railroad and material gathered by collectors association: models, costumes, posters, job referrals, model trains, and a very large scale model (1:43) with several trains running in a large Dinan landscape that is rich in details.

== See also ==
- List of SNCF stations in Brittany
