= Robert Jambon =

French military officer

Colonel Robert Jambon (25 May 1925 – 27 October 2011) was a French military officer. He fought alongside Hmong fighters in the First Indochina War of the 1940s and 1950s. During his career he earned the title of Commander of the Legion of Honour and medals such as the Croix de la Valeur Militaire and the Ordre national du Mérite.

In October 2011, Jambon committed suicide in Dinan, France, by shooting himself on the steps of the Indochina Monument. According to a suicide note published by Ouest-France, he died to protest against what he saw as the indifference of the French government and media to the plight of the Hmong in modern-day Laos. He was 86 years old.

He was interred at the family vault in Riols, Hérault.
