= Magic Fly =

1977 studio album by Space

Studio album by Space
- Released: April 1977
- Genre: Eurodisco; space disco
- Length: 32:23
- Label: Disques Vogue LDA 20276
- Producer: Jean-Philippe Iliesco

Space chronology
Magic Fly (1977)	Deliverance (1977)

Singles from Magic Fly
- 1. "Magic Fly" Released: May 1977; 2. "Tango in Space" Released: 1977

Magic Fly is the debut studio album by French band Space. It was recorded in 1976 but released in April 1977 by Disques Vogue. The album reached No. 1 in France, No. 11 on the UK Albums Chart and included the hit single of the same name, which reached No. 2 on the UK Singles Chart and No. 1 in Switzerland and West Germany.

== Critical reception and legacy ==
A version of the title track was used as the main theme of the original Chinese version of Jackie Chan's 1978 film Snake in the Eagle's Shadow (蛇形刁手).

A variation of the track Carry On, Turn Me On was used in the opening ceremony of the 2024 Summer Olympics in Paris as the Olympic torch was being carried along the River Seine towards the eventual lighting of the cauldron.

In 2012, writer David Buckley compared the single "Magic Fly" to Daft Punk, stating "It seems as if Daft Punk have long-lost parents after all".

== Track listing ==
All tracks are written by Ecama.

No.	Title	Length
1.	"Fasten Seat Belt"	5:58
2.	"Ballad for Space Lovers"	2:16
3.	"Tango in Space"	4:28
4.	"Flying Nightmare"	3:31
5.	"Magic Fly"	4:18
6.	"Velvet Rape"	4:27
7.	"Carry On, Turn Me On"	8:18
Total length:		33:16

The 1983 USSR release features a new composition entitled "Just Blue" by Didier Marouani to replace the track "Carry On, Turn Me On" which was removed due to censorship. The track "Velvet Rape" is also renamed to Вежливое Похищение which translated is "Polite Kidnapping". In 1996 the original was finally released in Russia on cassette.

== Personnel ==
=== Space ===
- Didier Marouani (as Ecama) – keyboards, synthesizers
- Roland Romanelli – keyboards, synthesizers
- Joe Hammer – drums, percussion
- Jannick Top – synthesizers

=== Production ===
- Jean Phillippe Illiesco – producer
- Patrick Fraigneau – engineer, mixing
- Jerome Corbier – remastering
- André Perriat – remastering

== Bibliography ==
- Buckley, David (16 August 2012). Kraftwerk: Publikation (1st ed.). Omnibus Press. ISBN 978-1847729316.
