= Stéphane Just =

French Trotskyist

Stéphane Just (13 August 1921 in the 11th arrondissement of Paris – 12 August 1997 in Suresnes) was a French Trotskyist.
