= Jean-Luc Lahaye =

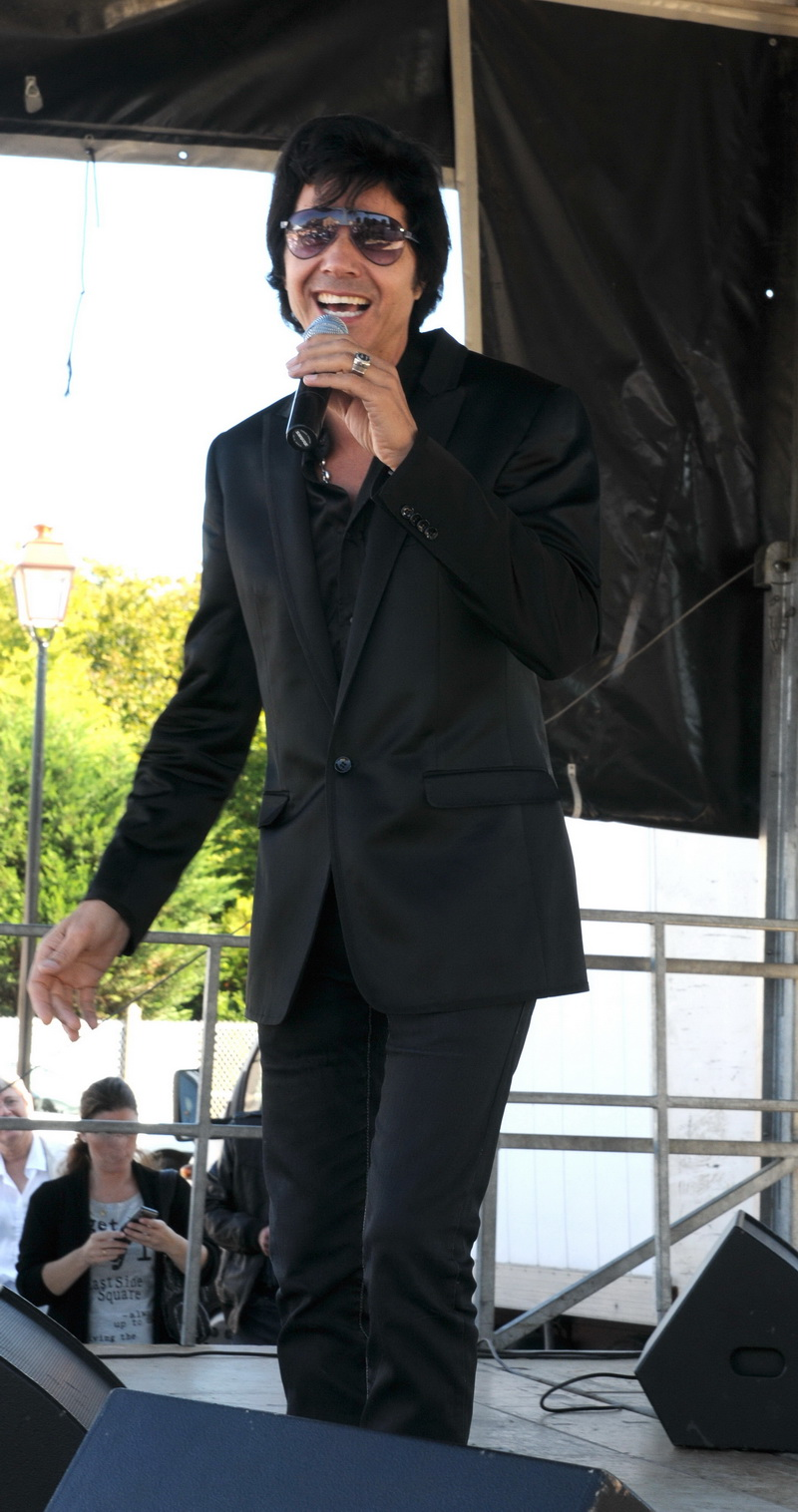

Background information
- Birth name: Jean-Luc Lahaeye
- Born: 23 December 1952 (age 72)
- Origin: France
- Genres: Pop music
- Occupation(s): Singer, host
- Years active: 1979–present
- Website: Official website

Jean-Luc Lahaye (born Jean-Luc Laheaye; 23 December 1952, in Paris) is a French pop singer, former television host, and occasional writer.

Lahaye had his greatest success as a singer in the 1980s, with his songs "Femme que j'aime" and "Papa chanteur" (#1 hit in France). After more than ten years of absence, he resumed singing in 2004.

Lahaye is currently facing criminal investigations in France on charges of statutory rape and sexual assault on minors. French media reported in October 2022 that the singer was banned from holding concerts by the Investigating Judge in charge of his case.
