= Space (French band) =

French electronic music band

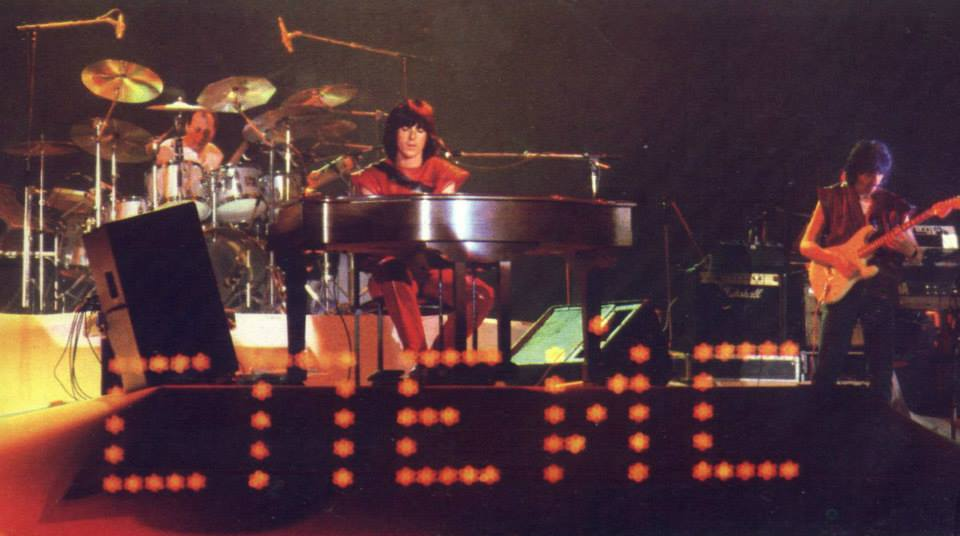
- Space performing in Moscow, Russia in 1983

Background information
- Also known as: Didier Marouani & Space
- Origin: France
- Genres: Electronica, space disco, spacesynth, new wave (past 1982)
- Years active: 1977–1980, 1982–present
- Members: Didier Marouani; Jeff Parent; Manu Chambo; Serge Munuera; Marc Hazon; Dominque Greffier; Jean-François Bourassin; Michel Aymé; Julius Tessarech; Bertin Meynard; Patrice Richard; Richard Ominetti; Jean-Louis Lechevallier
- Past members: Janny Loseth; Roland Romanelli; Jannick Top; Yann Benoist; John Edwards; Janny Loseth; Madeline Bell; Patrice Tison; Roy Robinson; Dennis Cottard; Cissy Stone; Joe Hammer
- Website: https://space.tm.fr/

Space (occasionally Didier Marouani & Space) are a French music band active from 1977 through 1980 and returning with on-stage remake performances since 1982. Their work is associated with the short-lived space disco genre and is a precursor of electronica.

== History ==
=== Instant success and breakup ===
Space was founded in 1977 by Didier Marouani (also known as Ecama). The band consisted of Didier Marouani, arrangers Roland Romanelli and Jannick Top, and singer Madeline Bell. Marouani by that time had some fame as a solo pop singer, but soon focused on his band, whose name was suggested by the song “Magic Fly”, originally written in 1976 for a television program dedicated to astrology:"Given the words of people who constantly told me that the melody resembles the sounds coming from space, I chose “Space” as the name".

In the early period, musicians strongly emphasized the sci-fi orientation of their group, often performing in stage costumes like spacesuits. Another reason for appearing in public in the form of "astronauts" was the current contract of Didier Marouani with record company Polydor: "The producer and I invited my record company to release 'Magic Fly' under my name, but the label decided that the composition was not good enough to do this ... My producer found another company, but I could not 'light up' under in my own name, since the contract with my company remained in force... The suits appeared also because no one could recognize me in it. I had to come up with a creative pseudonym, and I settled on 'Ecama'".

The first three albums — Magic Fly (1977), Deliverance (1977) and Just Blue (1978) — sold over 12 million records globally. After the recording of Magic Fly, American drummer Joe Hammer joined the band.

However, after "Just Blue" was released, a critical moment occurred in the group’s history related to the increasing desire of its leader to perform concerts (previously impossible due to the imperfection of available synthesizer models), which led to a conflict with producer Jean-Philippe Iliesco. Marouani stated: "Everything was going well, but at that time, when I met with my producer, I told him about my desire to perform on stage. At that time, we did not have a single 'live' performance, only television. I managed to get permission for a concert under the Eiffel Tower, with the support of (radio station) 'Europe 1', and the press too, but in the end, my producer decided to cancel everything. And then I said: 'I'm leaving,' because — a group that does not give concerts will die sooner or later".

Didier Marouani left the band in 1979, and Joe Hammer went on to do other projects, Romanelli and Jannick Top continued and released the album Deeper Zone in 1980. The band split up in 1981.

From 1982 Marouani and Joe Hammer performed and recorded as "Didier Marouani & Space" with Janny Loseth of Titanic as lead vocalist. The band was later renamed Paris-France-Transit in response to legal action. Hammer left in 1992.

=== The return of "spAce" and beyond ===
The name "spAce" was legally re-acquired after copyright disputes around 1990, allowing Didier Marouani to re-release classic albums and give a European live cover tour in 1993. Symphonic Space Dream was produced with collaboration from the Russian State Symphony Orchestra. In the same year, the S Club Juniors made a remix to their single "New Direction" featuring the backing track of Magic Fly. The band's hit "Magic Fly" as well as many other songs from the self-named album were remixed in 2003 by the Belgian dance music project Minimalistix. In 2004, their hit "Deliverance" was sampled in De La Soul's single Rock Co.Kane Flow featuring MF Doom. In 2007, it was retaken to feature in its entirety in Talib Kweli's two-piece composition Hostile Gospel (Deliver Us). 2011 saw the release of Space's most recent album, From Earth To Mars. The last track of this album, Message of Peace From Earth To Mars, features recorded samples of Yuri Gagarin's journey into space in 1961 and is a tribute to fifty years of space exploration.

== Members ==
=== Current ===
- Didier Marouani: keyboards, synthesizers (1977-1980, 1982–present)
- Jeff Parent (keyboards)
- Manu Chambo (keyboards)
- Serge Munuera (keyboards)
- Marc Hazon (percussions)
- Dominque Greffier (vocals, bass)
- Jean-françois Bourassin (guitar)
- Michel Aymé (guitar)
- Julius Tessarech (sound)
- Bertin Meynard (sound)
- Patrice Richard (lighting, manager)
- Richard Ominetti (lighting)
- Jean-Louis Lechevallier (lighting)

=== Past ===
- Roland Romanelli: keyboards, synthesizers (1977-1980)
- Jannick Top: keyboards, synthesizers (1977-1980)
- Joe Hammer: drums, percussion (1977-1979, 1982-1992)
- Janny Loseth: lead vocals (1982-1991)
- Madeline Bell: lead vocals (1977-1978)
- Cissy Stone: lead vocals (1978-1980)
- Patrice Tison: guitar (1979-1982)
- Yann Benoist: guitar (1983-2007)
- Roy Robinson: lead vocals (1991-1992)
- Dennis Cottard: keyboards, synthesizers (1982-1985)

== Discography ==
=== Albums ===
Year	Album	UK	Certifications
1977	Magic Fly	11	BPI: Silver
1977	Deliverance	—	
1978	Just Blue	—	
1980	Deeper Zone	—	
1981	The Best of Space	—	
1982	Paris France Transit	—	
1983	Concerts en URSS	—	
1987	Space Opera	—	
1994	Space Magic Concerts	—	
2002	Symphonic Space Dream	—	
2011	From Earth to Mars	—	
"—" denotes releases that did not chart.

=== Singles ===
Year	Single	Peak chart positions					Certifications
Year	Single	US Dance	US Pop	IRE	NL	UK	Certifications
1977	"Magic Fly"	―	―	3	20	2	BPI: Silver
1977	"Tango in Space"	―	―	―	―	57 (Note: Chart position is from the official UK "Breakers List".)	
1978	"Running in the City"	―	―	―	―	―	
1978	"Prison"	―	―	―	―	―	
1979	"Just Blue"	―	―	―	―	―	
1979	"My Love Is Music"	59	60	―	―	―	
1979	"Save Your Love for Me"	73	―	―	―	―	
1980	"On the Air"	―	―	―	―	―	
1980	"Tender Force"	―	―	―	―	―	
"—" denotes releases that did not chart or were not released in that territory.
