= Dinan =

Walled town in Brittany, France

- Subprefecture and commune
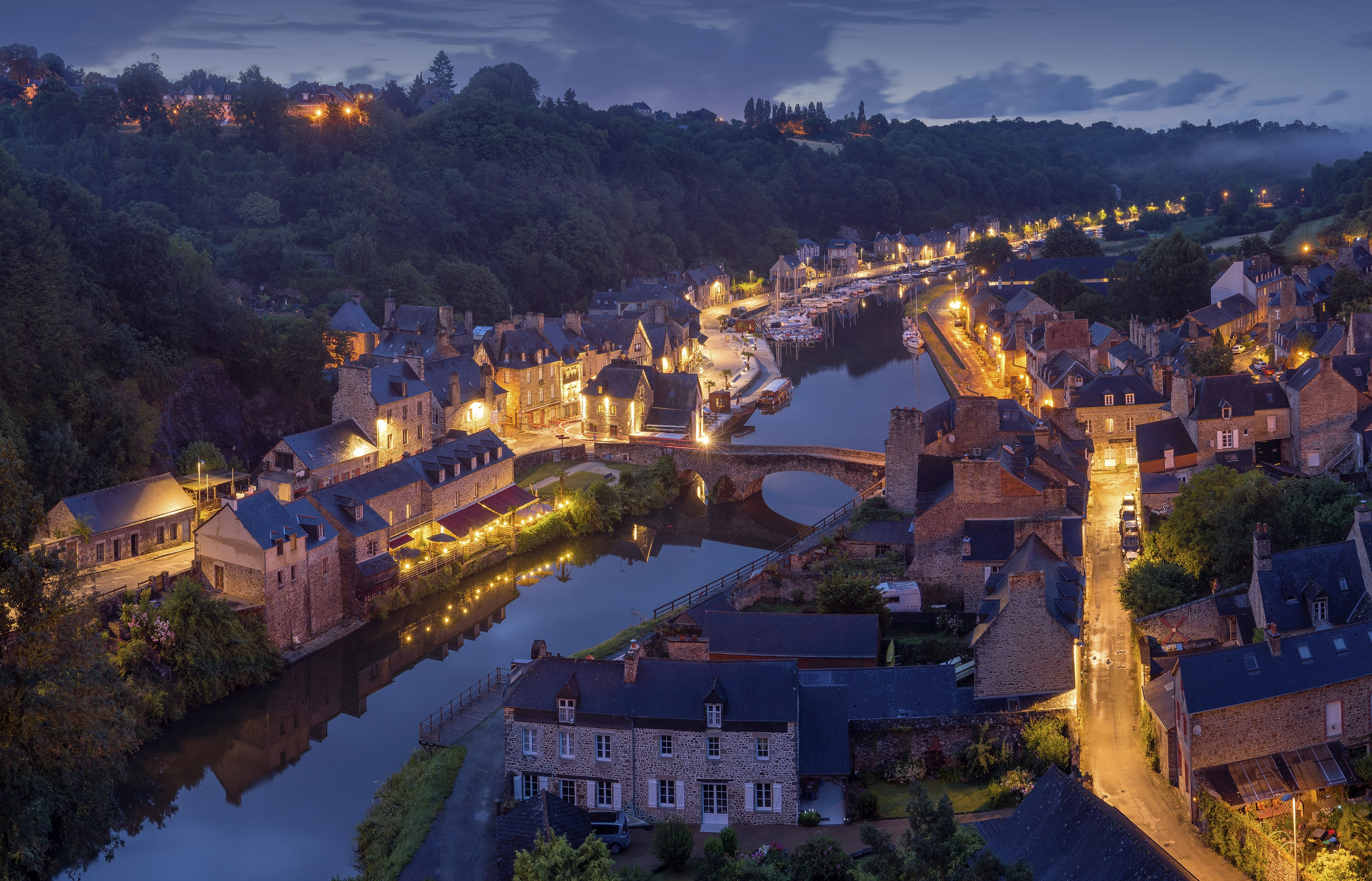

- Flag Coat of arms
- Location of Dinan
- Location within France Location within Brittany
- Coordinates: 48°27′23″N 2°02′56″W
- Country: France
- Region: Brittany
- Department: Côtes-d'Armor
- Arrondissement: Dinan
- Canton: Dinan
- Intercommunality: Dinan Agglomération

Government
  - Mayor (2020–2026): Didier Lechien
- Area^{1}: 8.71 km^{2} (3.36 sq mi)
- Highest elevation: 92 m (302 ft)
- Lowest elevation: 7 m (23 ft)
- Population (2023): 14,764
  - Density: 1,700/km^{2} (4,390/sq mi)
- Time zone: UTC+01:00 (CET)
  - Summer (DST): UTC+02:00 (CEST)
- INSEE/Postal code: 22050 /22100
- ^{1} French Land Register data, which excludes lakes, ponds, glaciers > 1 km^{2} (0.386 sq mi or 247 acres) and river estuaries.

Dinan (French pronunciation: [dinɑ̃]; Breton: [ˈdinãn]) is a walled Breton town and a commune in the Côtes-d'Armor department in northwestern France. On 1 January 2018, the former commune of Léhon was merged into Dinan.

== Geography ==
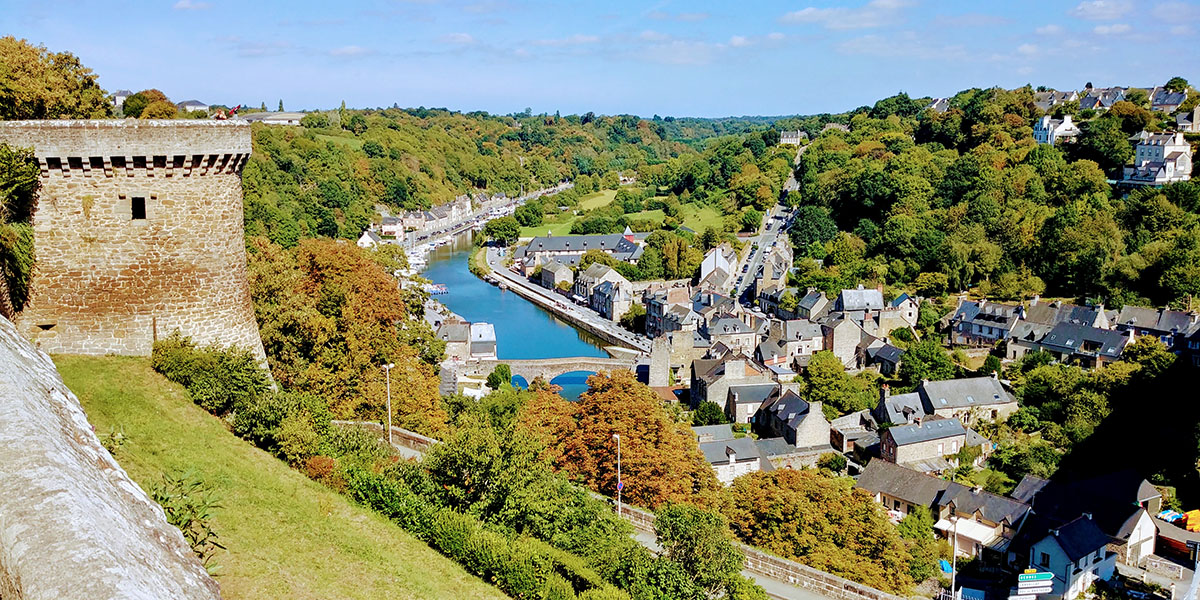
View of the Port of Dinan and the Rance river from the Promenade of Duchesse Anne at the Jardin Anglais (English Garden)

Instead of nestling on the valley floor like Morlaix, most urban development has been on the hillside overlooking the river Rance. The area alongside the river is known as the "port of Dinan", and is connected to the town by steep streets: Rue Jerzual and its continuation outside the city walls, the Rue Petit Fort. The Rance has moderate turbidity and its brownish water is somewhat low in velocity due to the very low gradient of the watercourse; pH levels have been measured at a slightly basic 8.13 within the city, and electrical conductivity of the waters has tested at 33 micro-siemens per centimetre. In the centre of Dinan, the Rance's summer flows are typically low, in the range of 14 cubic metres per second (490 cu ft/s).

For many years, the bridge over the river Rance at Dinan was the most northerly crossing point on the river, but the tidal power station at the mouth of the estuary, constructed in the 1960s downstream from Dinan, incorporates a 750-metre long tidal barrage, which also serves as a crossing point nearer to the sea.

Dinan station has rail connections to Saint-Brieuc, Lamballe and Dol-de-Bretagne.

=== Climate ===
Climate data for Dinan (Le Quiou) (1991–2020 normals, extremes 1985–present)
Month	Jan	Feb	Mar	Apr	May	Jun	Jul	Aug	Sep	Oct	Nov	Dec	Year
Record high °C (°F)	17.0 (62.6)	22.1 (71.8)	24.3 (75.7)	28.8 (83.8)	32.0 (89.6)	37.0 (98.6)	39.7 (103.5)	40.4 (104.7)	34.1 (93.4)	30.8 (87.4)	21.6 (70.9)	17.0 (62.6)	40.4 (104.7)
Mean daily maximum °C (°F)	9.3 (48.7)	10.4 (50.7)	13.3 (55.9)	16.2 (61.2)	19.4 (66.9)	22.5 (72.5)	24.7 (76.5)	24.6 (76.3)	21.9 (71.4)	17.3 (63.1)	12.7 (54.9)	9.7 (49.5)	16.8 (62.2)
Daily mean °C (°F)	6.1 (43.0)	6.6 (43.9)	8.5 (47.3)	10.5 (50.9)	13.4 (56.1)	16.0 (60.8)	17.7 (63.9)	17.7 (63.9)	15.4 (59.7)	12.5 (54.5)	9.0 (48.2)	6.4 (43.5)	11.6 (52.9)
Mean daily minimum °C (°F)	3.0 (37.4)	2.7 (36.9)	3.7 (38.7)	4.8 (40.6)	7.4 (45.3)	9.4 (48.9)	10.7 (51.3)	10.8 (51.4)	8.9 (48.0)	7.6 (45.7)	5.2 (41.4)	3.2 (37.8)	6.4 (43.5)
Record low °C (°F)	−12.0 (10.4)	−14.5 (5.9)	−7.2 (19.0)	−4.8 (23.4)	−1.6 (29.1)	2.6 (36.7)	4.5 (40.1)	3.5 (38.3)	0.7 (33.3)	−5.5 (22.1)	−6.6 (20.1)	−8.5 (16.7)	−14.5 (5.9)
Average precipitation mm (inches)	71.8 (2.83)	58.3 (2.30)	50.6 (1.99)	54.5 (2.15)	62.8 (2.47)	52.8 (2.08)	46.6 (1.83)	52.3 (2.06)	57.1 (2.25)	78.0 (3.07)	86.0 (3.39)	86.6 (3.41)	757.4 (29.82)
Average precipitation days (≥ 1.0 mm)	12.6	11.5	9.7	10.3	9.4	7.8	7.8	8.2	8.5	12.1	14.0	14.3	126.3
Source: Meteociel

== Population ==
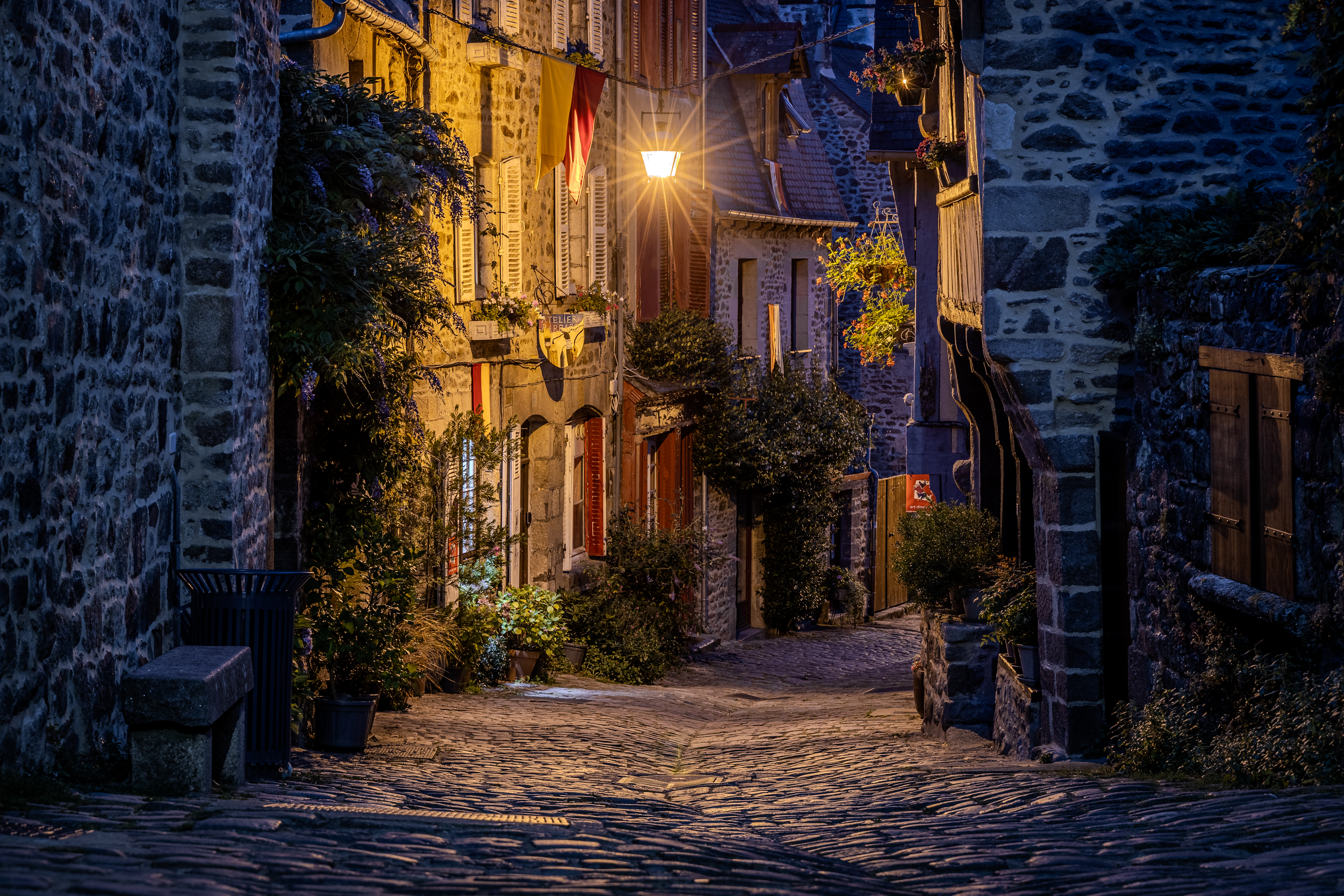
Rue du Petit-Fort

Inhabitants of Dinan are called dinannais and dinannaises.

Historical population

Year	Pop.	±% p.a.
1793	6,393	—
1800	6,406	+0.03%
1806	7,188	+1.94%
1821	7,175	−0.01%
1831	8,044	+1.15%
1836	7,356	−1.77%
1841	7,533	+0.48%
1846	8,159	+1.61%
1851	7,732	−1.07%
1856	8,238	+1.28%
1861	8,089	−0.36%
1866	8,510	+1.02%
1872	7,698	−1.66%
1876	8,180	+1.53%
1881	9,964	+4.02%
1886	10,105	+0.28%
1891	10,444	+0.66%
1896	10,620	+0.33%
1901	10,534	−0.16%

Year	Pop.	±% p.a.
1906	11,078	+1.01%
1911	11,410	+0.59%
1921	10,161	−1.15%
1926	10,002	−0.31%
1931	10,633	+1.23%
1936	11,822	+2.14%
1946	12,737	+0.75%
1954	13,844	+1.05%
1962	12,847	−0.93%
1968	13,137	+0.37%
1975	13,429	+0.31%
1982	12,267	−1.28%
1990	11,591	−0.71%
1999	10,907	−0.67%
2007	11,087	+0.20%
2012	10,768	−0.58%
2017	14,166	+5.64%
2023	14,764	+0.69%

Populations after 2017 for the area corresponding with the new commune of Dinan (incl. Léhon).
Source: EHESS and INSEE (2007-2023)

=== Breton language ===
In 2008, 4.97% of primary school children attended bilingual schools.

== Attractions ==
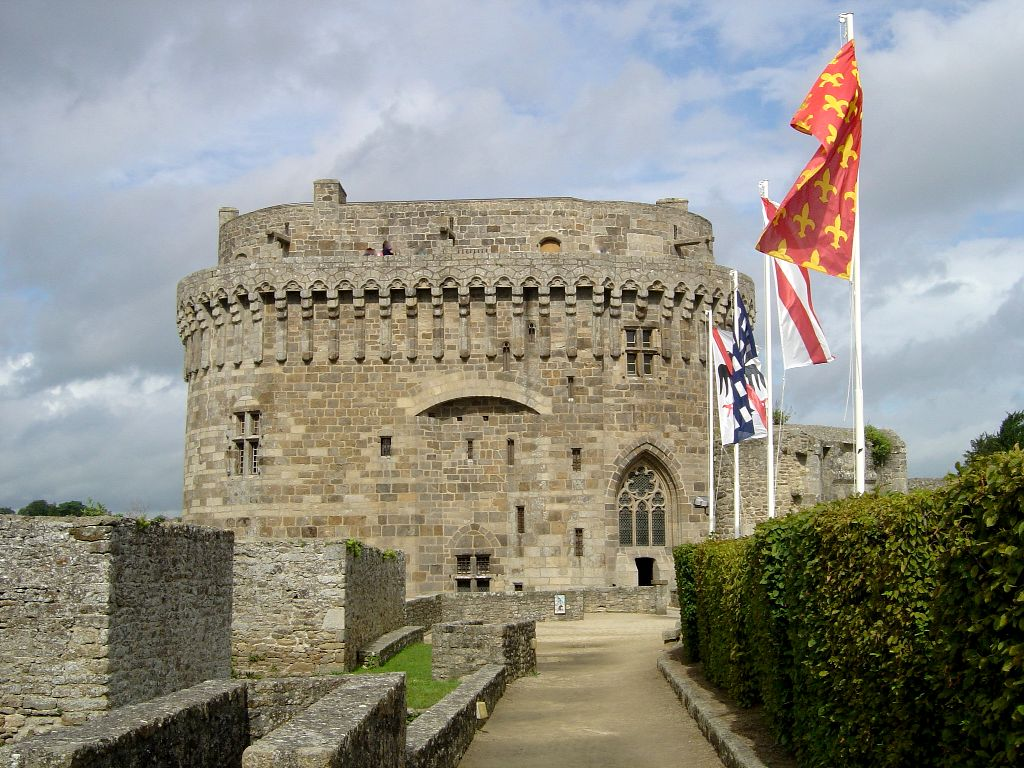
Château de Dinan

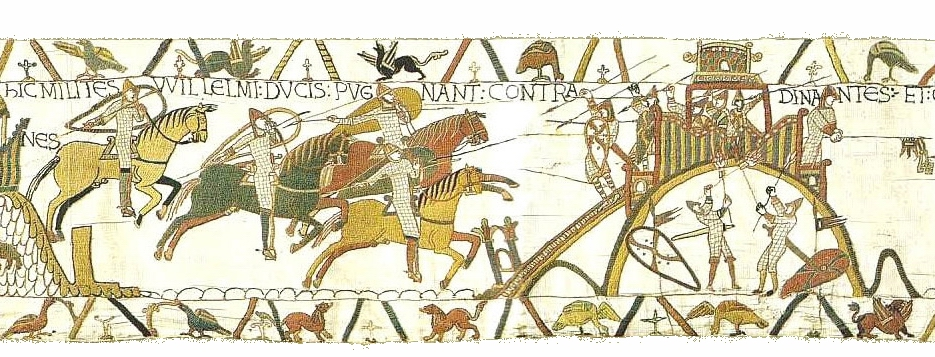
HIC MILITES WILLELMI DUCIS PUGNANT CONTRA DINANTES ("Here the knights of Duke William fight against the men of Dinan"). Scene from the Bayeux Tapestry, c.1066, showing the early castle of Dinan

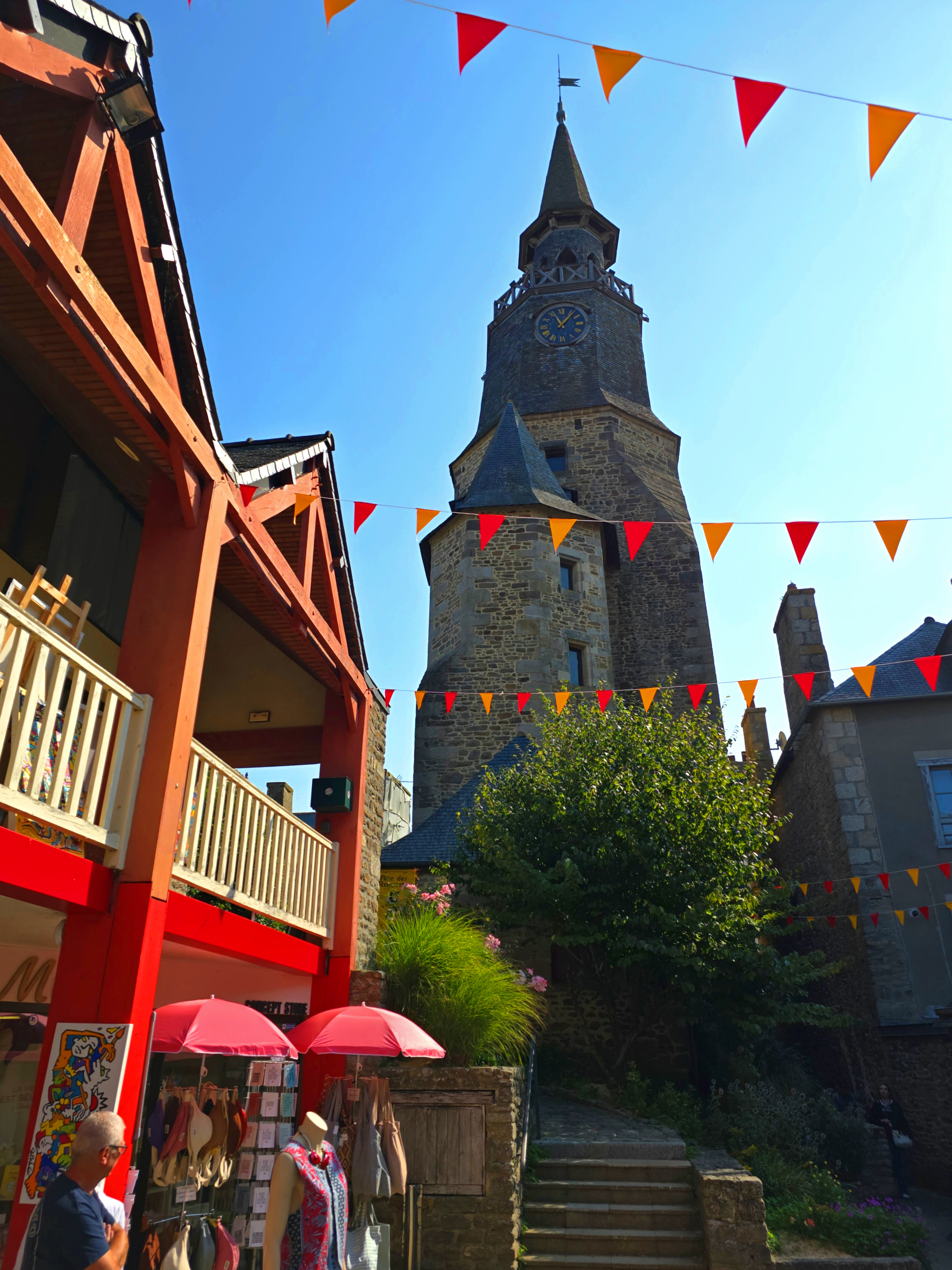
Clock Tower (Tour de l’Horloge, beffroi)

The medieval town on the hilltop has many fine old buildings, some of which date from the 13th century. The town retains a large section of the city walls, part of which can be walked round.

Major historical attractions include the Jacobins Theatre dating from 1224, the flamboyant Gothic St Malo's Church, the Romanesque St Saviour's Basilica, Duchess Anne's Tower and the Château de Dinan.

A major highlight in the calendar is Dinan's Fête des Remparts. The town is transformed with decoration and many locals dress up in medieval garb for this two-day festival. The festival takes place over the third weekend in July every even-numbered year. At least in November, the city hosts the Festival Films courts de Dinan, an international French-speaking film festival.

== Notable people ==
Prominent people born in Dinan include:

- Charles Beslay (1795–1878), member of the Council of the Paris Commune
- Théodore Botrel (1868–1925), poet and singer
- Yves Guyot (1843–1928), politician and economist
- Odile Ohier (born 1963), long distance athlete
- Auguste Pavie (1847–1925), explorer and diplomat
- Charles Pinot Duclos (1704–1772), author
- Pierre de Porcaro (1904–1945), Catholic priest and prisoner-of-war
- Jean Rochefort (1930–2017 ), actor
- Da Silva (singer) (1976–), singer
- Yann Benoist, musician, (1951–)

Other people associated with Dinan include:

- François-René de Chateaubriand (1768–1848), writer, studied in Dinan
- Maurice Colbourne (actor born 1939) (1939–1989), actor
- Bertrand du Guesclin (c1320-80), connétable of France. Born at nearby Broons. His heart is buried in Dinan.
- John Everett Millais (1829–96), British painter who lived in Dinan as a child
- Danielle Mitterrand (1924–2011), wife of President François Mitterrand, educated at the Roger Vercel college
- Colonel Robert Jambon (1924/5-2011), soldier in the First Indochina War, died in Dinan
- Jean-François Paillard (1928– ), conductor, educated at the Cordeliers de Dinan
- Henri Pinault (1904–1987), Catholic Bishop of Chengdu, educated at the Cordeliers de Dinan
- René Pleven, (1901–1993), politician, minister, essayist. The hospital in Dinan is named after him.
- Horace Tuck (1876–1951), English painter, visited Dinan for its picturesque vistas
- Roger Vercel (1894–1957), writer, winner of the Prix Goncourt in 1934, died in Dinan. A college in the town is named after him.
- Edward Matthew Ward (1816–1879), English artist who painted views of Dinan

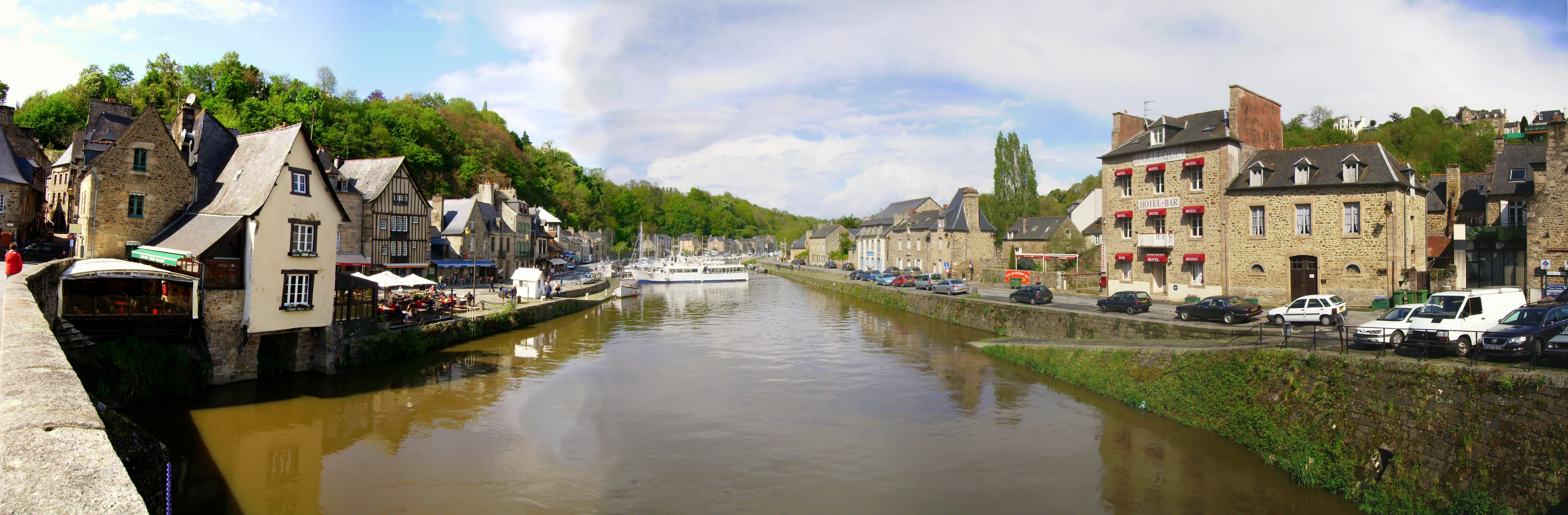
Dinan Port on the Rance River

== International relations ==
Dinan is a twin town with:

- Dinant, Belgium
- Exmouth, United Kingdom
- Lugo, Spain

== See also ==
- Communes of the Côtes-d'Armor department
