= Didier Marouani =

French composer and musician (born 1953)

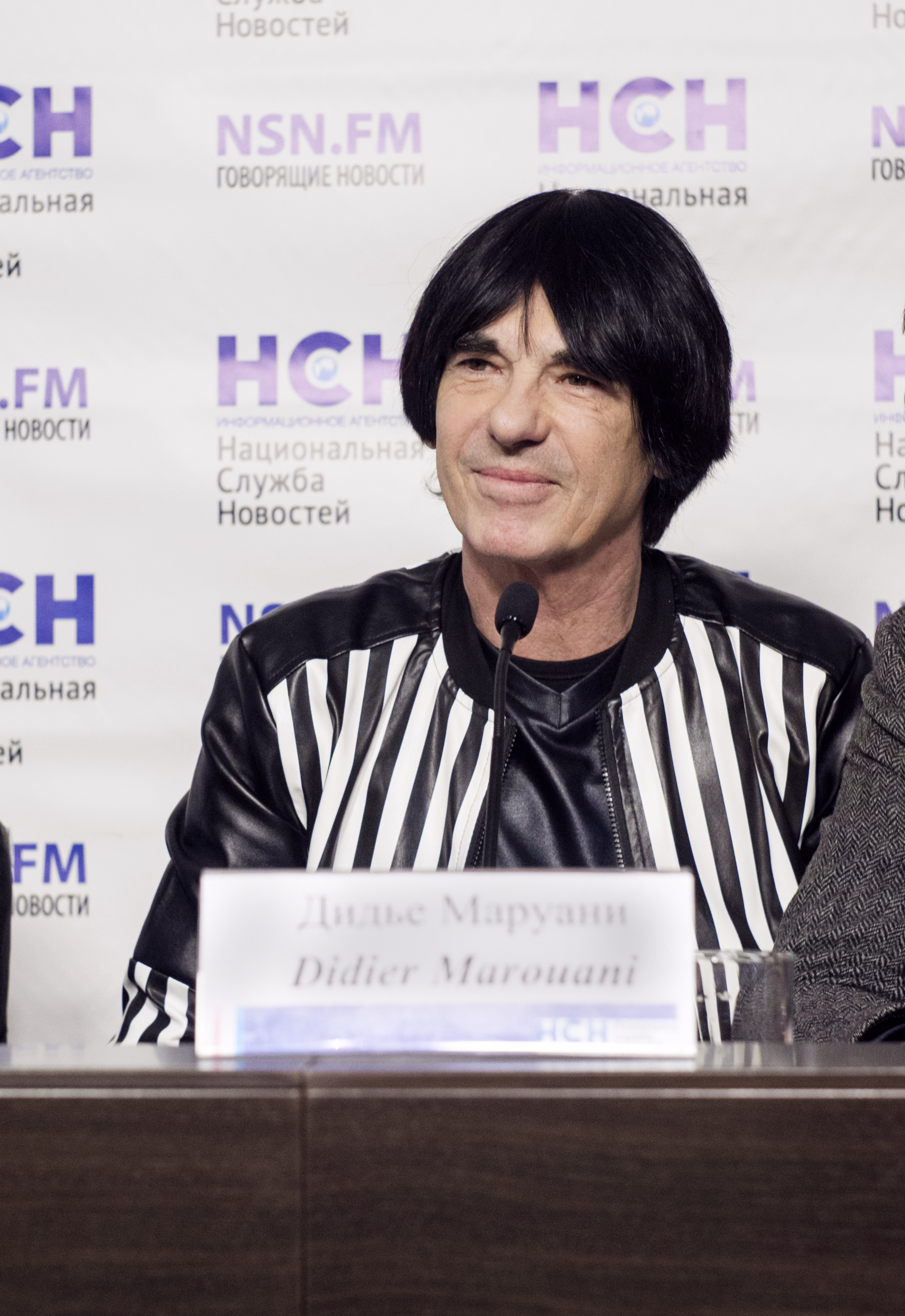
- Marouani in Moscow, Russia in 2019

Background information
- Born: 14 July 1953 (age 72); Monaco
- Genres: Electronic music
- Occupations: Musician, composer
- Years active: 1970s–present

Didier "Ecama" Marouani (born 14 July 1953) is a French composer and musician born in Monaco.

== Biography ==
Didier started his career as a pop singer and made his first single, "Je suis ton chevalier" (I am your knight) with Etienne Roda-Gil as a lyricist in 1975. He followed this by touring with Johnny Hallyday, Claude François and Joe Dassin. In 1977, he formed the band Space, under which he performed as the pseudonym Ecama. The title track from the first album, "Magic Fly", reached number 2 on the U.K. Singles Chart and was used as the main theme song of the original Chinese version of Jackie Chan's 1978 film Snake in the Eagle's Shadow (蛇形刁手). This was followed by the albums Deliverance (1977) and Just Blue (1978). In 1980 he left Space after a dispute with producer Jean-Phillip Illiesco. Later, he participated in another electronic venture "Paris-France-Transit" (1982). In 1983, Didier & Space went to the USSR to give 21 concerts for 600,000 people. In 1992, Didier was able to obtain the necessary authorization for a concert in the Red Square in Moscow. Some 360,000 spectators attended this free concert.

Throughout the 1980s, Didier Marouani and Space maintained quite a large popularity in France and many European socialist republics including Poland, Czechoslovakia, Romania and the Soviet Union. In 1987, Didier composed a new album Space Opera, the first opera composed for synthesizers and choirs. He was able to obtain the participation of both the Red Army Choirs and the Harvard University Choirs (USA) for his album. The album was relayed to the Soviet space station Mir, making the album the first compact disc to be heard in space. The CD had been launched into space together with a CD player with the Russian cosmonauts. Space Opera went on to achieve great success in Europe.

In 2001, the new Space album Symphonic Space Dream was performed as a premiere in Kyiv at the Palace "Ukraine" with the participation of the National Symphonic Orchestra of Ukraine with 110 musicians. In 2002, they performed in Moscow at the Kremlin Theater with a capacity of 6,000 people with the participation of the Presidential Symphonic Orchestra. This was followed by a performance in St. Petersburg attended by over 12,000 people. The song "New Direction [Magic Fly Radio Version]" incorporated elements of the track "Magic Fly" performed by U.K. pop group S Club Juniors on their Together CD.

In 2015, Didier performed as a special guest on a music show "Znamenie" together with Evgeny Khmara in October Palace, Kyiv.

In 2009, a huge concert was held in Moscow at the Olympisky Stadium. In October 2009, Nang Records in England released a Best of Space CD, completely remastered with 14 tracks, followed by a remix album the following month.

=== Cinema ===
Marouani appeared in a cameo role in the Ukrainian short film Ideal Friend, a science fiction directed by Serhii Alioshechkin, which is scheduled to premiere in 2025.

=== Controversy ===
On 29 November 2016, Russian media reported that Marouani has been detained in Moscow by Russian police following a complaint by Philip Kirkorov with whom Marouani had a disagreement regarding a copyright infringement case. He was released the following day.

=== Honors ===
On 14 May 2021, asteroid 275215 Didiermarouani was named in his honor by the Working Group for Small Bodies Nomenclature. The main-belt asteroid was discovered by astronomer Timur Krjačko at the Zelenchukskaya Station in 2009.
