= Roland Romanelli =

French synthesist and composer (born 1946)

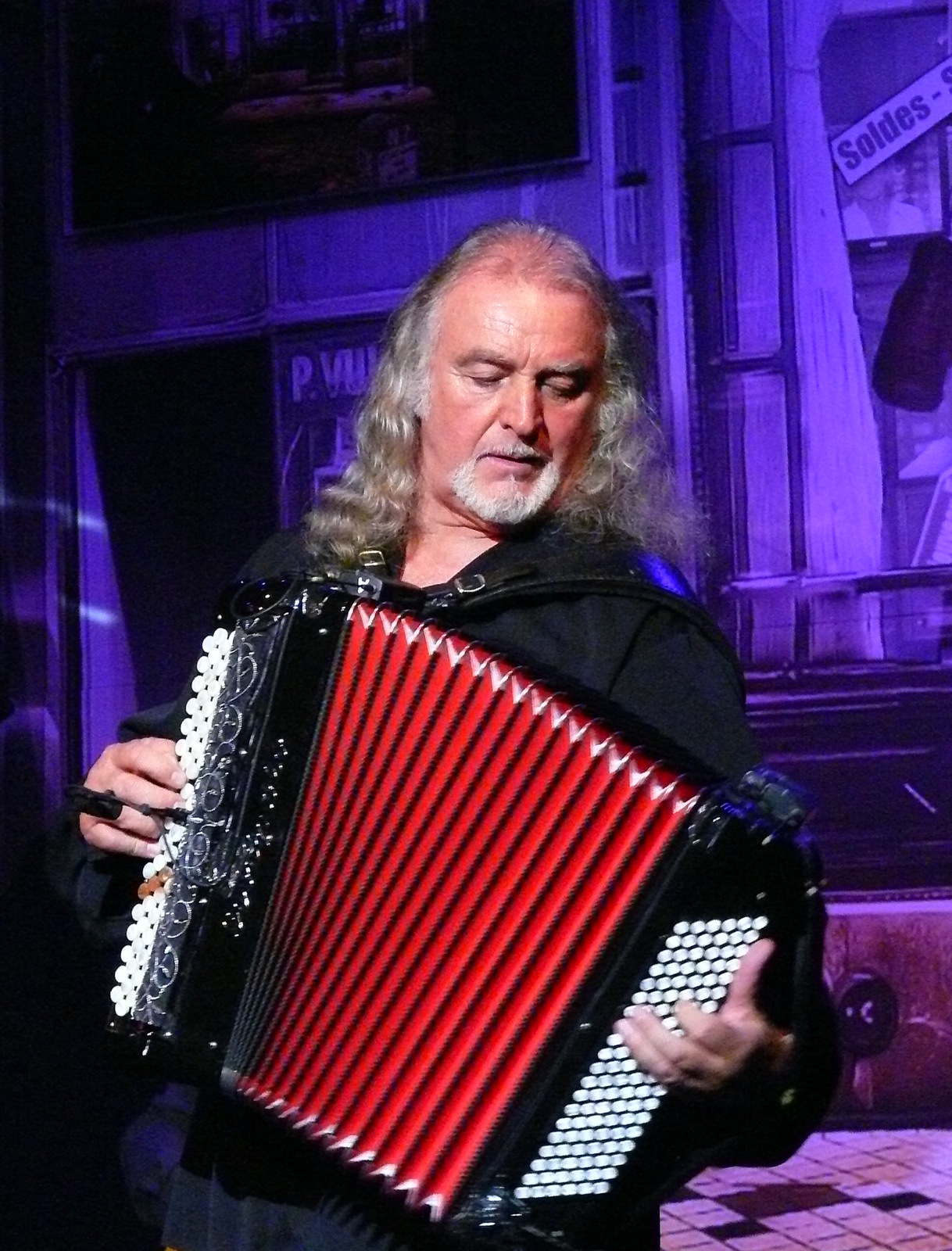
Roland Romanelli

Roland Romanelli (born 1946 in Algiers) is a French accordionist, keyboardist, composer, and arranger. He became well known as the accordionist for the singer Barbara from 1966 to 1986. He has also accompanied other prominent French singers including Johnny Hallyday and Michel Delpech. During his career, he has collaborated with Rusty Egan and other notable figures in popular music. He was an early adopter of the Fairlight system.

In his youth, Romanelli was a dancer. He moved to Paris in 1966. He was a session player on accordion and keyboards for the singer Barbara. He soon worked for other musicians including Charles Aznavour. In the late 1970s, he worked in the French space disco scene, and was a founding member of the popular band Space. He took up synthesizers, which helped his career grow in the 1980s. His 1982 album Connecting Flight was also released in the US on PolyGram Records.

== Notable performances ==
Romanelli played the accordion in Jérôme Savary's production of the musical comedy Irma la Douce in 2000. On New Year's Day 2004, he performed at the fourth annual "Comme à Vienne" concert at the Opéra-Comique with fellow accordionist Marcel Azzola.

He accompanied French singer Arnaud Askoy on accordion and violin in La Promesse Brel on tour in Tunisia in 2025.

== Discography ==
- Roland Romanelli / Christophe Labrèche - Concerto De Ma Paranoïa (1978) C-LAB 18-5-78
- Marie-Paule Belle / Roland Romanelli / Jannick Top - B.O Du Feuilleton Télévisé Dickie Roi (1981)
- Connecting Flight (1982) T1-1-9002 Polydor / PolyGram Records (US)
- Roland Romanelli / Jannick Top - April Orchestra Vol. 43 (1982)

== Filmography ==
- Vodka Lemon (2003) – Accordion
