= Constitution of Ukraine =

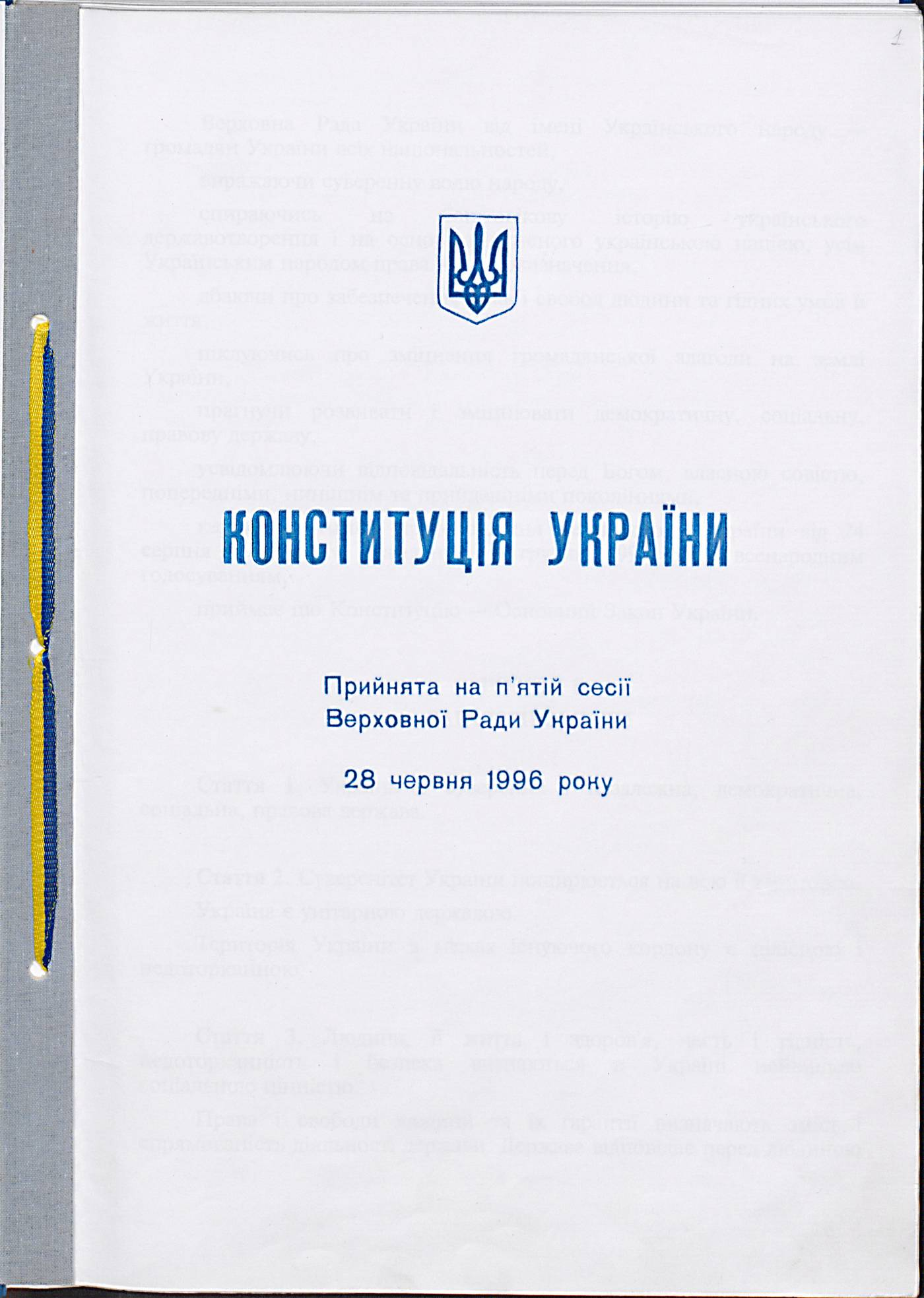

Overview
- Original title: Конституція України
- Jurisdiction: Ukraine
- Created: 28 June 1996
- System: Unitary semi-presidential republic

Government structure
- Branches: 3
- Head of state: President
- Chambers: Unicameral (Verkhovna Rada)
- Executive: Cabinet of Ministers
- Judiciary: Supreme Court; Constitutional Court and others
- First legislature: 12 May 1998
- Supersedes: 1978 Constitution of the Ukrainian SSR

Full text
- Constitution of Ukraine at Wikisource

The Constitution of Ukraine (Ukrainian: Конституція України, romanized: Konstytutsiia Ukrainy, pronounced [konstɪˈtuts⁽ʲ⁾ijɐ ʊkrɐˈjinɪ]) was adopted and ratified at the 5th session of the Verkhovna Rada, the parliament of Ukraine, on 28 June 1996. The constitution was passed with 315 ayes out of 450 votes possible (300 ayes minimum). All other laws and other normative legal acts of Ukraine must conform to the constitution. The right to amend the constitution through a special legislative procedure is vested exclusively in the parliament. The only body that may interpret the constitution and determine whether legislation conforms to it is the Constitutional Court of Ukraine. Since 1996, the public holiday Constitution Day is celebrated on 28 June.

In 2004, amendments were adopted that significantly changed Ukraine's political system; these changes are sometimes referred to as the 2004 Constitution. In 2010, then-President of Ukraine Viktor Yanukovych reverted these changes on the basis of a ruling made by the Constitutional Court of Ukraine. Following the events of Euromaidan (2013–2014), the 2004 amendments were reinstated.

== History ==
Until 8 June 1995, Ukraine's supreme law was the Constitution (Fundamental Law) of the Ukrainian SSR (adopted in 1978, with numerous later amendments). On 8 June 1995, President Leonid Kuchma and Speaker Oleksandr Moroz (acting on behalf of the parliament) signed the Constitutional Agreement for the period until a new constitution could be drafted.

In 1994, Kuchma restarted the failed Constitutional Commission (which had been defunct since 1992), ensuring its composition represented not just the parliament but also the executive (himself). He proposed a stopgap constitution called the Law on State Power and Local Self-Government (a.k.a. “Law on Power” or “Small Constitution”), which allowed for a very strong executive.

In May of 1995 an amended version of the Law on Power (which weakened the presidency somewhat) was voted on and received a simple majority in the Verkhovna Rada, not the supermajority of two-thirds it needed to become law, given that it suspended parts of the 1978 constitution. The failure of this amended version of the Law on Power prompted Kuchma to decree a national referendum on the Ukrainian people’s confidence in both himself and the Rada, which the Rada immediately denounced as unconstitutional.

Given his popularity and the parliament’s relative unpopularity, Kuchma was able to compel the Rada to adopt a one-year provisional constitutional agreement, konstytutsinynyi dohovir, albeit again only with a simple majority, not enough to lend the dohovir constitutional legitimacy. The dohovir stipulated that Kuchma’s Law on Power would be the provisional constitution for a year and required that any new draft constitution be put to a national referendum after being agreed upon by the president and the parliament. It has been criticized as a “sketchy, hastily prepared piece of legislation” which “failed to clearly define the legislative–executive relations.”

A secret ad-hoc working group of representatives of the three branches of government began meeting in the summer of 1996 to draft a constitution. The group drafted a document that closely resembled the dohovir, featuring a strong presidency. After amendments, the draft was ratified in November 1995 by a majority of the Constitutional Commission and reached the Verkhovna Rada in March 1996.

As per the prevailing 1978 constitution, the Constitution could only be changed by the Verkhovna Rada with a supermajority. But the dohovir did not specify how many parliamentarians—one half or two thirds—would be needed to support a new draft constitution. Supporters of the draft began arguing that merely a simple majority in the Verkhovna Rada was necessary for the draft to be put to a referendum.

Within the parliament, a special commission headed by deputy Mykhailo Syrota produced an amended version of the draft that weakened the presidency somewhat. The Syrota draft attained the support of a simple majority of parliamentarians in its first reading. When Kuchma announced that his preferred draft, rather than the Syrota draft favoured by the parliamentarians, would be submitted to a national referendum, the Rada moved to assert its authority over the constitutional process.

The Syrota draft was adopted during an overnight parliamentary session after almost 24 hours of debate of 27–28 June 1996, unofficially known as "the constitutional night of 1996." The Law No. 254/96-BP ratifying the constitution, nullifying previous constitutions and the Agreement was ceremonially signed and promulgated in mid-July 1996. According to a ruling of the Constitutional Court of Ukraine, the constitution took force at the moment when the results of the parliamentary vote were announced on 28 June 1996 at approx. 9 a.m. Kyiv Time. Ukraine was the last of the post-Soviet states to adopt its own constitution. On Constitution Day 2018, President Petro Poroshenko remarked that the 1710 Constitution of Pylyp Orlyk is the predecessor of Ukraine's current constitution.

In February 2019 the constitution was amended to require governments to seek European Union and NATO membership.

== Structure ==
The Constitution of Ukraine is divided into 15 chapters:

1. General Principles
2. Human and Citizens' Rights, Freedoms and Duties
3. Elections. Referendums
4. Verkhovna Rada of Ukraine
5. President of Ukraine
6. Cabinet of Ministers of Ukraine. Other Bodies of Executive Power
7. Prokuratura (Prosecutor's Office)
8. Justice
9. Territorial Structure of Ukraine
10. Autonomous Republic of Crimea
11. Local Self-Government
12. Constitutional Court of Ukraine
13. Introducing Amendments to the Constitution of Ukraine
14. Final Provisions
15. Transitional Provisions

== Amendments ==
In accordance with Chapter XIII: Introducing Amendments to the Constitution of Ukraine, the constitution can only be amended with the consent of no less than two-thirds of the constitutional composition (the 450 Ukrainian lawmakers) of the Verkhovna Rada of Ukraine. In addition, amendments to Chapter I — "General Principles," Chapter III — "Elections. Referendum", and Chapter XIII — "Introducing Amendments to the Constitution of Ukraine" can only be amended by the parliament of Ukraine on the condition that it is also approved by an All-Ukrainian referendum designated by the President of Ukraine. In May 2012, President Viktor Yanukovych set up the Constitutional Assembly of Ukraine; a special auxiliary agency under the President for drawing up bills of amendments to the Constitution, the president then will introduce them in parliament.

=== 2004 and 2010 amendments and 2014 return to 2004 amendments ===
On 8 December 2004, the parliament passed Law No. 2222-IV amending the constitution. The law was approved with a 90 percent majority (402 voted in favour and 21 against, with 19 abstentions; 300 in favour required for passage) simultaneously with other legislative measures aimed at resolving the 2004 presidential election crisis. It was signed almost immediately in the parliamentary chamber by the outgoing President Leonid Kuchma and promulgated on the same day. These amendments weakened the power of the President of Ukraine, who lost the power to nominate the Prime Minister of Ukraine, which became the task of the parliament solely. The President could only appoint the Minister of Defence and Foreign Minister. The President also lost the right to dismiss members of the Cabinet of Ukraine, but gained the right to dissolve Parliament. If no coalition in parliament could be formed to appoint a Prime Minister, the President would have no choice but to call new parliamentary elections. The 2004 constitutional amendments were passed in the Parliament only with limited consultation and discussion between political forces, in the context of the Orange Revolution. They therefore attracted criticism from several internal (Ukrainian political parties) and external bodies (the Council of Europe, the European Parliament and the Venice Commission).

The amendments took force unconditionally on 1 January 2006. The remaining amendments took force on 25 May 2006, when the new parliament assembled after the 2006 elections. On 1 October 2010, the Constitutional Court of Ukraine overturned the 2004 amendments, considering them unconstitutional. The Court had started to consider the case on the political reform in 2004 under a motion from 252 coalition lawmakers regarding the constitutionality of this reform of 14 July 2010. The 2010 nullification decision was highly controversial. The Council of Europe's Human Rights Commissioner received several reports alleging that the resignation of four judges in the run-up to the decision occurred as a result of extensive pressure by the executive. On 18 November 2010, the Venice Commission published its report titled The Opinion of the Constitutional Situation in Ukraine in Review of the Judgement of Ukraine's Constitutional Court, in which it stated: "It also considers highly unusual that far-reaching constitutional amendments, including the change of the political system of the country – from a parliamentary system to a parliamentary presidential one – are declared unconstitutional by a decision of the Constitutional Court after a period of 6 years. ... As Constitutional Courts are bound by the Constitution and do not stand above it, such decisions raise important questions of democratic legitimacy and the rule of law".

On 21 February 2014, the parliament passed a law that reinstated the 8 December 2004 amendments of the constitution. This was passed under a simplified procedure, without any decision of the relevant committee, and was passed in the first and the second reading in one vote by 386 deputies. The law was approved by 140 MPs of the Party of Regions, 89 MPs of Batkivshchyna, 40 MPs of UDAR, 32 of the Communist Party, and 50 independent lawmakers. According to Radio Free Europe, the measure was not signed by the then-President Viktor Yanukovych, who was subsequently removed from office. The reinstatement of these amendments was adopted according to the 2014 Agreement on settlement of political crisis in Ukraine. This was followed shortly thereafter by the annexation of Crimea by the Russian Federation and the 2014 Russian military intervention in Ukraine.

=== 2019 amendments ===
On 7 February 2019, the Verkhovna Rada voted 334 to 17 to amend the constitution to state Ukraine's strategic objectives as joining the European Union and NATO.

== See also ==
=== Former constitutions ===
- Constitution of Pylyp Orlyk (1710)
- Constitution of the Ukrainian People's Republic (1918)
- First Constitution of the Ukrainian SSR (1919)
  - Amendments of 1925
- Second Constitution of the Ukrainian SSR (1929)
- Third Constitution of the Ukrainian SSR (1937)
- Fourth Constitution of the Ukrainian SSR (1978)
- Constitution of the Autonomous Republic of Crimea (1998)

=== Others ===
- Constitutional economics
- Constitutionalism
- Rule according to higher law
