= Olha Ilkiv =

Ukrainian resistance leader (1920–2021)

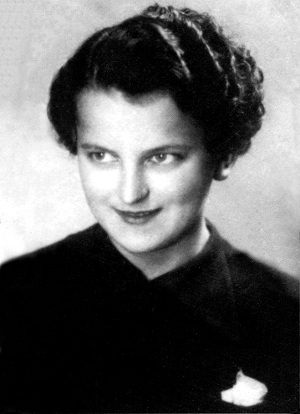
- Ilkiv in 1937
- Born: 21 June 1920; Stryj, Second Polish Republic
- Died: 6 December 2021 (aged 101); Lviv, Ukraine
- Occupation: Resistance fighter
- Known for: Liaison officer of Roman Shukhevych (1947-1950)
- Spouse: Volodymyr Lykota (m. 1943; died 1948)
- Children: 2
- Awards: Order of Princess Olga

Olha Faustinivna Ilkiv (Ukrainian: Ільків Ольга Фаустинівна; 21 June 1920 – 6 December 2021) was a member of Organization of Ukrainian Nationalists (OUN), partisan and signaller of the Ukrainian Insurgent Army. She is best known in Ukraine for being the signaller of Ukrainian Insurgent Army Commander-in-Chief Roman Shukhevych.

Ilkiv was also a former inmate, who spent 14 years in Soviet prisons. In 2008 she was awarded the Order of Princess Olga, 3rd class.

== Biography ==
Ilkiv was born on 21 June 1920 in Stryi (Polish: Stryj), then part of the Second Polish Republic after the signing of the Treaty of Warsaw. Her parents were Faustin Ilkiv and Rosalia-Caterina (née Kotsur).

After her parents' divorce in 1934, Ilkiv went with her mother to live in Warsaw. She received her education at the Ukrainian Girls' Institute in Przemyśl, where Ilkiv joined the Ukrainian Scouting organization Plast. Ilkiv joined the Organization of Ukrainian Nationalists (OUN) on 30 June 1941. After the German invasion of Ukraine, Ilkiv fled to Zhytomyr, where she found a job on the railway. There she used her documents to get train tickets and hand them over to Ukrainian insurgents. In addition, Ilkiv's responsibilities included recruiting people to form an OUN women's network.

In April 1943, Ilkiv married Volodymyr "Danylo" Lykota, a member of the Ukrainian Insurgent Army. They had two children, Zvenislava (born 1946) and Volodymyr (born 1947). In early 1947, when their daughter was three months old, Ilkiv was tasked with hiding Roman Shukhevych, the commander-in-chief of the Ukrainian Insurgent Army. It was believed that the young family would provide a perfect cover. In order to produce a more secure cover for Shukhevych, Ilkiv fictitiously married Shukhevych's bodyguard Lubomyr Polyuha, who also had false documents. Ilkiv's husband Volodymyr died in battle on 17 March 1948, never having met his son.

=== Imprisonment ===
The OUN command decided to send Ilkiv and her children to Donbas to start a new life. However, at the last moment, she decided to go to say goodbye to friends in Lviv, where she was arrested on 14 March 1950. As a member of the resistance, she was arrested and imprisoned in Lviv. In prison, she found out that Shukhеvych had perished in an armed fight with an operational group of the Ministry of State Security that attacked his hiding place (kryivka) in the village Bilohorshcha (today part of the city of Lviv) on 5 March 1950. She was beaten and tortured and was forced by guards to swallow psychotropic substances.

Ilkiv was sentenced in 1952 to 25 years for "participation in an anti-Soviet gang." Her children were taken to an orphanage in Pohulyanka, their names were changed to Vira and Andriy Boyko, and they were brought up like models of "Homo Sovieticus".

After the death of Stalin in 1953, his successor Nikita Khrushchev pardoned hundreds of people on the condition that they repented; Ilkiv did not do so. There were four women left in the USSR who did not repent – Olha Ilkiv, Kateryna Zarytska, Halyna Didyk and Daria Husyak. All of them were Roman Shukhevych's liaisons. They were placed in one cell so that they would not incite their cellmates. Fourteen years later, Ilkiv was released after her request for pardon. In 1953, following the death of Stalin, the director of the orphanage of Ilkiv's children, Valentina Antipova, responded to Ilkiv's letter at her own risk, so her children found out that their mother was alive.

=== Later life ===
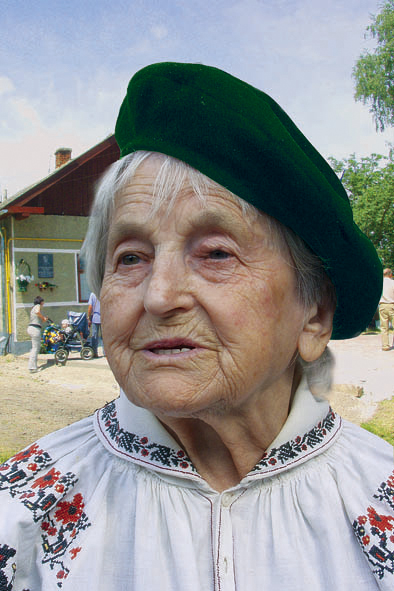
Ilkiv in 2007

From September 1964, Ilkiv worked as a kiosk maker, cloakroom attendant and nurse at the Lviv Regional Hospital, and from 1966 as a janitor. From 1972 until her retirement in 1976, she worked at the Lviv Historical Museum and in the department of funds of the Museum of Folk Architecture and Life (1977–1979).

Ilkiv took part in the constituent assembly of the KUN in Kyiv (1992) and the OUN in Ukraine (1993). From 1995 to 2000, she was the deputy chairman of the All-Ukrainian League of Ukrainian Women.

In 2008, Ilkiv was awarded the Order of Princess Olga, 3rd class.

Ilkiv died in Lviv on 6 December 2021, aged 101.
