= Arseniy Yatsenyuk =

Prime Minister of Ukraine from 2014 to 2016

- Арсеній Яценюк
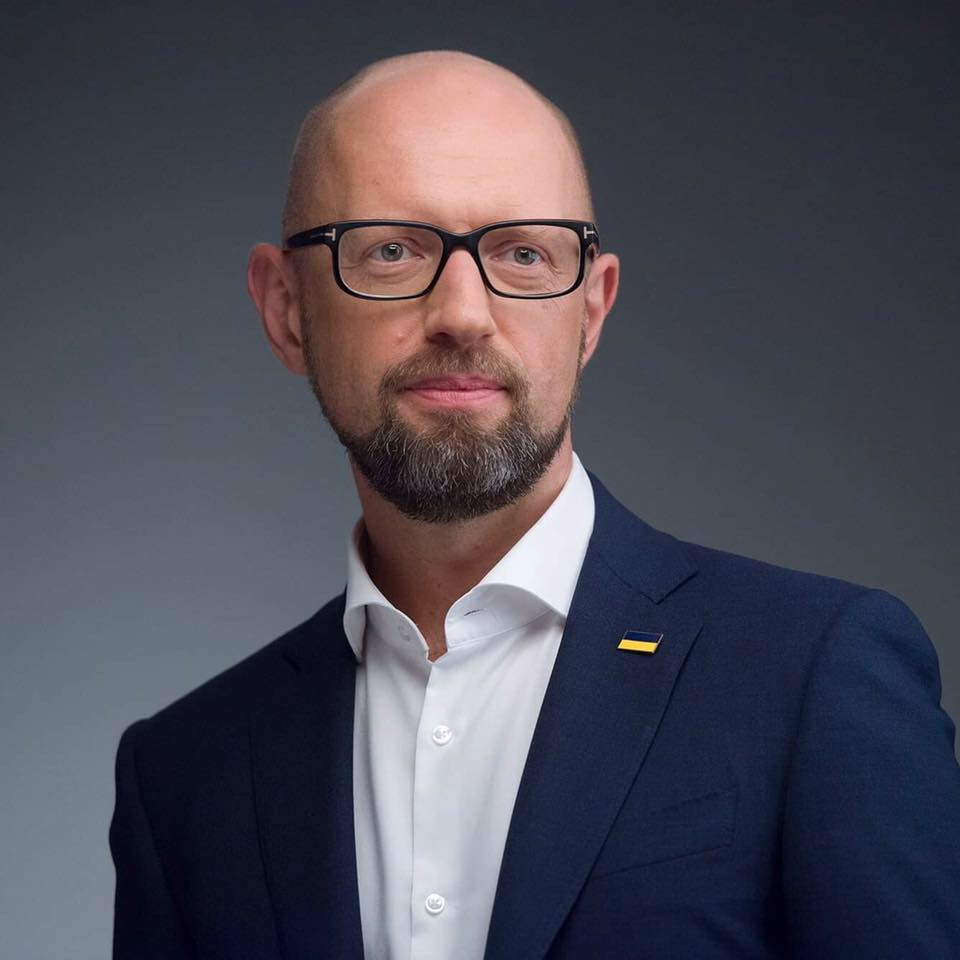
- Yatsenyuk in 2018

15th Prime Minister of Ukraine
- In office 31 July 2014 – 14 April 2016
- President: Petro Poroshenko
- Preceded by: Volodymyr Groysman (acting)
- Succeeded by: Volodymyr Groysman
- In office 27 February 2014 – 25 July 2014
- President: Oleksandr Turchynov (acting); Petro Poroshenko
- Deputy: Vitaly Yarema; Hennadiy Zubko
- Preceded by: Oleksandr Turchynov (acting)
- Succeeded by: Volodymyr Groysman (acting)

8th Chairman of the Verkhovna Rada
- In office 4 December 2007 – 12 November 2008
- President: Viktor Yushchenko
- Preceded by: Oleksandr Moroz
- Succeeded by: Oleksandr Lavrynovych (acting)

Minister for Foreign Affairs
- In office 21 March 2007 – 4 December 2007
- Prime Minister: Viktor Yanukovych
- Preceded by: Volodymyr Ohryzko (acting)
- Succeeded by: Volodymyr Ohryzko

Minister for Economy
- In office November 2003 – February 2005
- In office 27 September 2005 – 4 August 2006
- Prime Minister: Yuriy Yekhanurov
- Preceded by: Serhiy Teryokhin
- Succeeded by: Volodymyr Makukha

First Vice-President of the National Bank of Ukraine
- In office September 2001 – January 2003

Personal details
- Born: 22 May 1974 (age 52) Chernovtsy, Soviet Union
- Spouse: Tereziya Victorivna Hur (m. 2000)
- Children: 2
- Education: Chernivtsi University; Kyiv National University of Trade and Economics
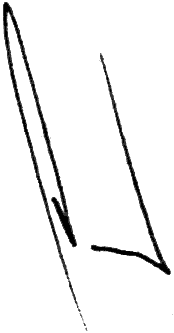
- Signature
- Website: Official website
- Arseniy Yatsenyuk's voice (in Ukrainian) Recorded 13 March 2023
- *Volodymyr Groysman served as Acting Prime Minister from 25 July 2014 – 31 July 2014.

Arseniy Petrovych Yatsenyuk (Note: In this name that follows East Slavic naming customs, the patronymic is Petrovych and the family name is Yatsenyuk.) (Note: Ukrainian: Арсеній Петрович Яценюк, IPA: [ɐrˈsɛn⁽ʲ⁾ii̯ peˈtrɔwɪtʃ jɐtseˈnʲuk].) (born 22 May 1974) is a Ukrainian politician, economist and lawyer who served two terms as Prime Minister of Ukraine – from 27 February 2014 to 27 November 2014 and from 27 November 2014 to 14 April 2016. He was the youngest foreign affairs minister in Ukraine's history.

Yatsenyuk's first government post was as minister of economy from 2005 to 2006; subsequently he was Foreign Minister of Ukraine in 2007 and Chairman of the Verkhovna Rada (parliament) from 2007 to 2008. Yatsenyuk was one of the leaders of Ukraine's second largest party All-Ukrainian Union "Fatherland", and former leader of its parliamentary faction. He became the prime minister of Ukraine following the 2014 revolution that removed Viktor Yanukovych from power. In September 2014, Yatsenyuk started the new party People's Front. On 16 February 2016, the president of Ukraine, Petro Poroshenko, asked Yatsenyuk to resign saying he had lost the support of the coalition and the same day, the Ukrainian parliament voted the cabinet's work unsatisfactory but rejected a call for a vote of no confidence. On 10 April 2016, Yatsenyuk announced that he would report to parliament on 12 April and resign as prime minister. On 14 April 2016, Yatsenyuk was replaced by new prime minister Volodymyr Groysman. As of December 2025, he is the Chairman of the Kyiv Security Forum and the founder of the Open Ukraine Foundation. He holds the diplomatic rank of extraordinary and plenipotentiary ambassador.

== Early life ==
Yatsenyuk was born on 22 May 1974, in Chernivtsi, Ukraine, then part of the Soviet Union. His father, historian Petro Ivanovich Yatsenyuk, was a professor at the Faculty of History at Chernivtsi National University and has since become deputy dean of its history faculty. Arseniy's mother, Maria Grigoriievna Yatsenyuk (née Bakaj), has long been a French teacher at area high schools and in the French Department of Foreign Languages at Chernivtsi University. Yatsenyuk speaks Ukrainian, Russian and English, and has some knowledge of Romanian as well.

=== Ancestry ===
According to Yatsenyuk, he comes from a family of ethnic Ukrainians, and is a member of the Ukrainian Greek Catholic Church. He is of partly Romanian ancestry; one of his ancestors was a citizen of Romania from the region around Chernivtsi. Some sources state he was born to a family of ethnic Romanian-Jewish-Ukrainians. However, Yaakov Bleich, a chief rabbi of Ukraine, stated, "Arseniy Yatsenyuk is not Jewish." Furthermore, Anna Rudnitskaya said, "[Yatsenyuk's] hypothetical Jewishness was never established."

=== Education ===
After Yatsenyuk began studying at Chernivtsi University in 1992, he set up a student law firm. Yatsenyuk graduated from the university in 1996, and later attended the Chernivtsi Trade-Economics Institute of the Kyiv National Trade-Economics Institute in 2001. In addition to holding a law degree and a master's degree in accounting and auditing, Yatsenyuk also earned a Ph.D. in economics from the Ukrainian Academy of Banking of the National Bank of Ukraine.

== Legal and banking careers ==
From December 1992 to September 1997, Yatsenyuk was the president of Yurek Ltd., a law firm based in Chernivtsi. From January 1998 until September 2001, Yatsenyuk worked in the Aval bank, based in Kyiv. From November 2003 to February 2005, Yatsenyuk served as the first vice-president of the National Bank of Ukraine under Serhiy Tihipko. After Tihipko left the National Bank, Arseniy Yatsenyuk was put in charge of it.

== Political career ==
From September until November 2001, Yatsenyuk served as an acting Minister of Economy of Crimea, and from November of the same year until January 2003, served as the official Minister of Economy of Crimea.

After Vasyl Tsushko was appointed as the new governor of Odesa Oblast, Tsushko asked Yatsenyuk to serve as his vice-governor, which he served from 9 March to September 2005.

=== Minister of the Economy (September 2005 – August 2006) ===
From 27 September 2005 to 4 August 2006, he served as the Minister of Economy of Ukraine in the Yekhanurov Government.

Yatsenyuk then headed talks about Ukrainian membership in the World Trade Organization. For example he signed the U.S. – Ukraine WTO Bilateral Market Access Agreement, a precursor agreement that paved the way to the full accession of Ukraine on 16 May 2008.

From 20 September 2006, he served as the first vice-president of the Head of Secretariat of the President of Ukraine, and the representative of the president in the Cabinet of Ministers of Ukraine.

=== Foreign Minister of Ukraine (2007) ===
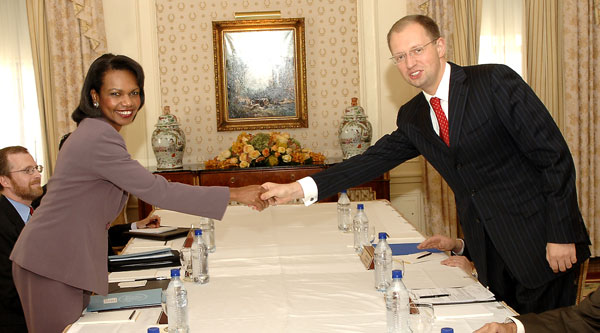
Yatsenyuk as minister of foreign affairs meeting with United States secretary of state Condoleezza Rice

Yatsenyuk was proposed for the post of foreign minister by the president of Ukraine, Viktor Yushchenko. Yatsenyuk was confirmed by the Verkhovna Rada (parliament) on 21 March 2007 with 426 votes (from 450 maximum).

In his April 2007 remarks made to the Carnegie Endowment for International Peace he commented that the Ukrainian transition to a market economy was a success.

In July 2007 while he was still foreign minister, Yatsenuk started the Open Ukraine Foundation, which he intended to become an international foundation for the "strengthening and development of Ukraine's reputation in the world."

=== Chairman of the Verkhovna Rada (December 2007 – November 2008) ===
In the early parliamentary elections held on 30 September 2007, Yatsenyuk was elected to the parliament from Our Ukraine–People's Self-Defense Bloc (number 3 in the bloc's member list). On 3 December 2007, he was nominated for the position of the chairman of the Verkhovna Rada from the democratic coalition formed from the Yulia Tymoshenko Bloc and Our Ukraine–People's Self-Defense Bloc. On 4 December 2007, Yatsenyuk was elected the chairman of the Parliament. His candidacy was the only one in the ballot, and he obtained 227 votes in favor (from the democratic coalition; opposition abstained from the voting).

In early 2008, Yatsenyuk co-wrote along with Tymoshenko and Yushchenko the so-called "letter of three" to NATO, in which they asked for a Membership Action Plan with a view to joining the Alliance. At the beginning of 2008 the work of the Rada was blocked for two months due, according to at least one observer, to this letter.

During the Ukrainian political crises of September 2008 Yatsenyuk offered his resignation on 17 September 2008. A vote on his dismissal on 11 November 2008, was declared invalid by the counting commission of the Parliament (the vote was proposed by opposition party Party of Regions).

On 12 November 2008, a total of 233 of 226 required deputies satisfied the resignation statement of Yatsenyuk and thus dismissed him from his post of Chairman of the Verkhovna Rada. The voting was carried out through the parliaments voting system and not by means of secret ballots, as stipulated by the parliamentary regulations. After his dismissal Yatsenyuk told journalists that he will form a new political force "for change in the country."

On 21 November 2008, Yatsenyuk was also dismissed by President Viktor Yushchenko from the National Security and Defense Council.

=== 2010 presidential campaign ===
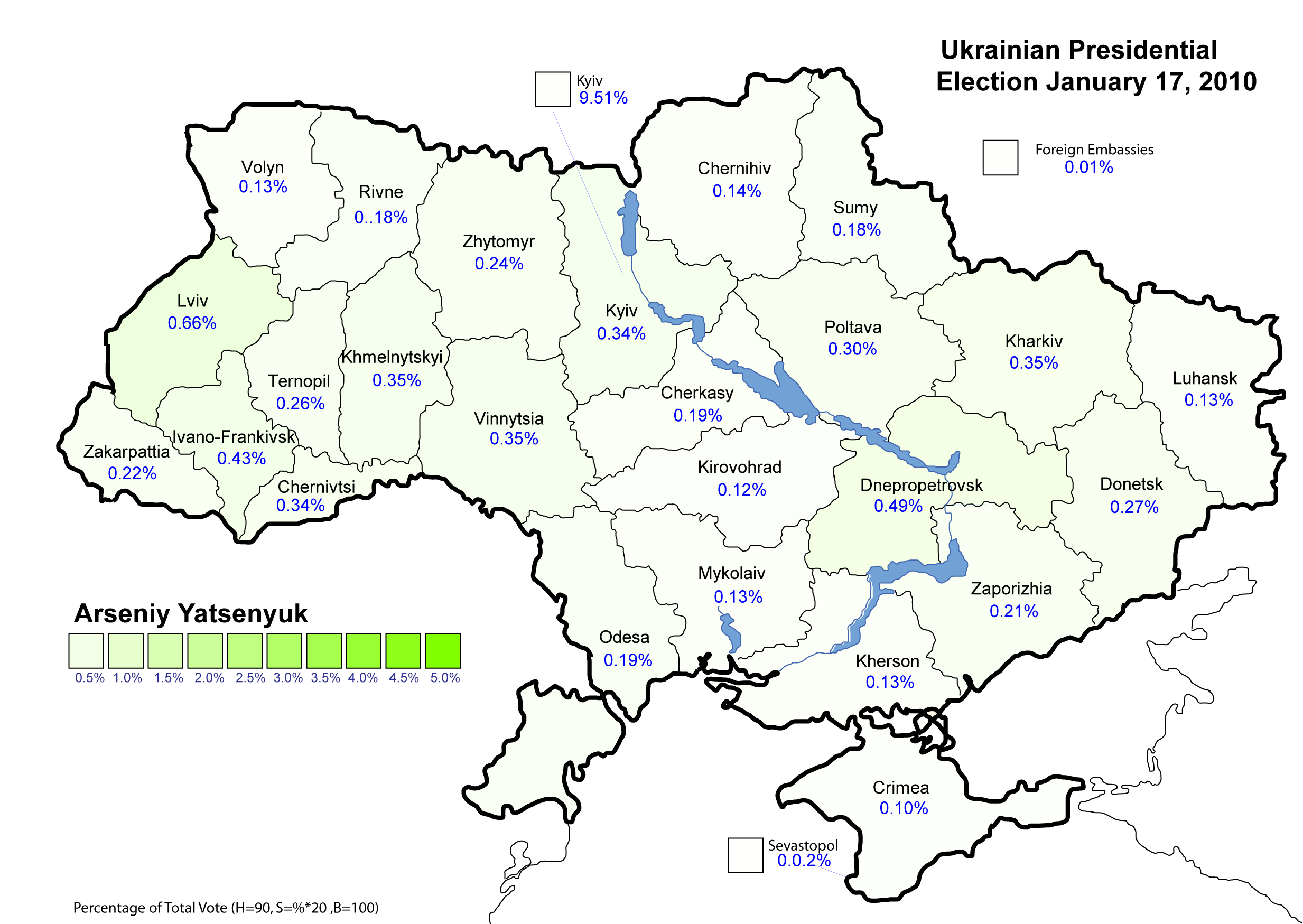
Yatsenyuk's vote share by oblast in the first round of the 2010 Ukrainian presidential election.

On 16 December 2008, Yatsenyuk announced plans to create a political party on basis of the Front of Changes public initiative. In an interview with Den on 4 February 2009, he claimed to have no allies among the contemporary politicians. Polls held in the last months of 2008 suggested a political party led by Yatsenyuk would pass the 3 percent election threshold in a Ukrainian parliamentary election.

On 5 April 2009, Yatsenyuk announced his candidacy for President of Ukraine in the next presidential election. During the election, campaign fellow candidate Serhiy Ratushniak repeatedly insulted Yatsenyuk because of his alleged Jewish roots. Among other things, Ratushniak called Yatsenyuk an "impudent little Jew" who was "successfully serving the thieves who are in power in Ukraine and is using criminal money to plough ahead towards Ukraine's presidency."

Yatsenyuk's presidential campaign was estimated to cost about $60–$70 million. When Yatsenyuk billboards first appeared around Ukraine at the end of June 2009, Yatsenyuk was depicted as a military-style leader, while his previous image was that of a "young liberal". Some analysts think that this did not help the campaign. On 13 January 2010, Yatsenyuk stated that his election campaign had cost ₴80 million and that "The number of my advertising posters is ten times less than that of all of my political opponents"; Yatsenyuk claimed that funds from his election budget were mainly spent on his appearances on television.

After the elections, Yatsenyuk wanted to dissolve the Verkhovna Rada because, in his view, it would prevent him from working. He also stated in November 2009 that the Yulia Tymoshenko Bloc and the Party of Regions were "almost a single whole".

In late November 2009, he stated he was not interested in "using his votes as bargaining material" for a high political post.

Arseniy Yatsenyuk's voice
recorded on "Echo of Moscow" in June 2011

On 21 February 2010, President Yanukovych offered three candidates for Prime Minister of Ukraine: Serhiy Tihipko, Yatsenyuk and Party of Regions lawmaker Mykola Azarov. However, Yatsenyuk declined this proposal to hold a high post in the new cabinet after the Ukrainian parliament adopted an amendment on 9 March 2010, which enabled independent lawmakers to take part in forming a majority coalition, instead of only parliamentary factions; Yatsenyuk disapproved of this amendment. Instead he called for early parliamentary elections: "Unconstitutional attempts by parliamentarians to form a coalition and a government would deepen the political crisis and the crisis of statehood as such". To be premier in a coalition with communists was unacceptable for Yatsenyuk. Yatsenyuk formed an oppositional government in March 2010, next to another oppositional government headed by Bloc Yulia Tymoshenko, opposing the Azarov Government. In April 2010, Yatsenyuk was officially chosen as party leader of Front for Change; by that time the public initiative had become a political party also.

=== Parliament faction leader ===
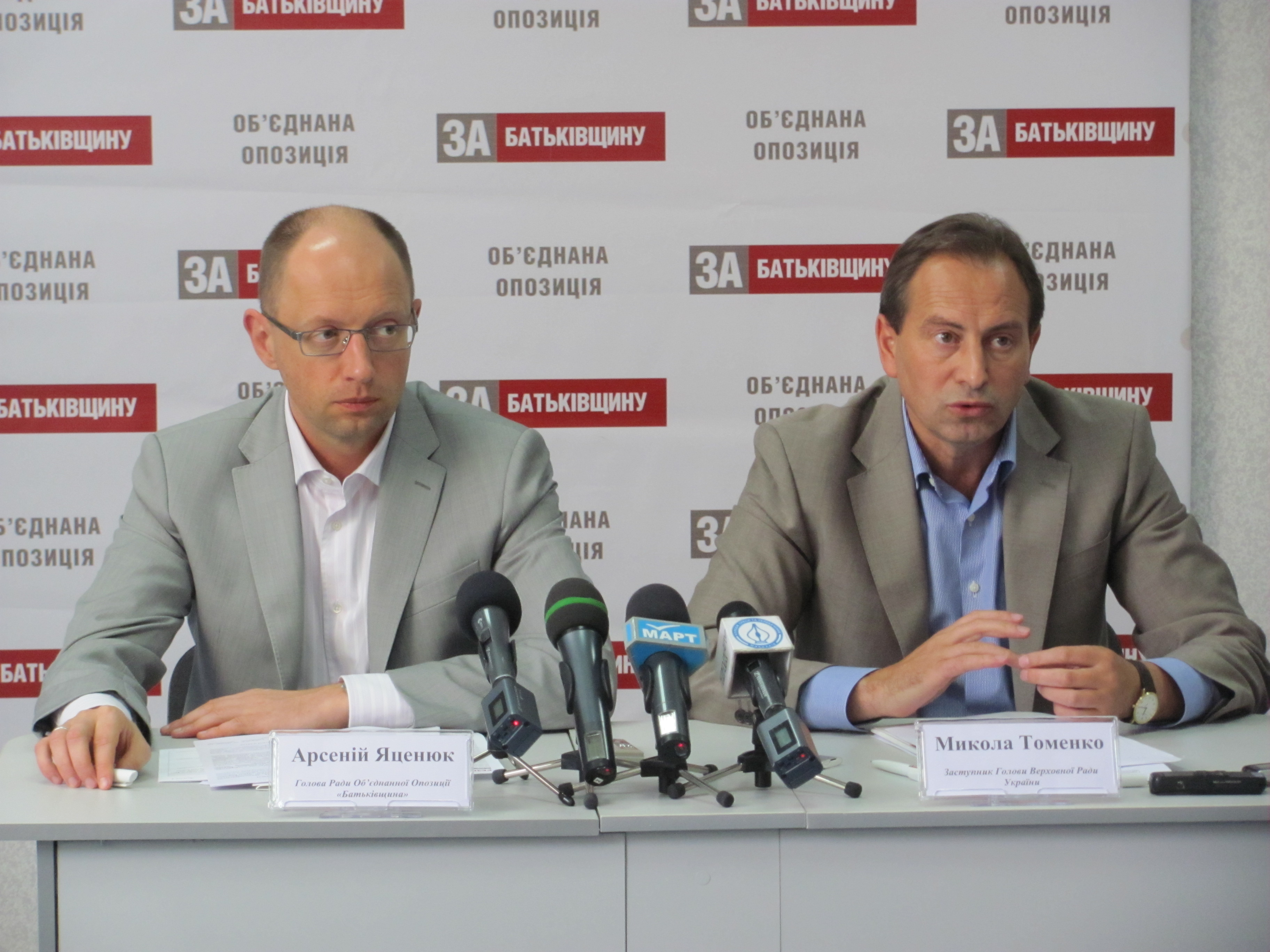
Yatsenyuk and Mykola Tomenko at a press conference of Yatsenyuk in Mykolaiv

During the October 2012 Ukrainian parliamentary election, Yatsenyuk competed on a party list based on the party All-Ukrainian Union "Fatherland". Yatsenyuk stressed in April 2012 "Front of Changes existed and will exist" but also hinted the same month the alliance could lay basis for one single party.

The party competed on one single party under "umbrella" party "Fatherland", together with several other parties, during the October 2012 parliamentary elections. During the election, this list won 62 seats (25.55% of the votes) under the proportional party-list system and another 39 by winning 39 simple-majority constituencies; a total of 101 seats in Parliament. Yatsenyuk headed this election list because "Fatherland"-leader Yulia Tymoshenko was imprisoned. Yatsenyuk was elected leader of the parliamentary faction of "Fatherland" on 12 December 2012.

On 15 June 2013, his Front for Change (party) merged into "Fatherland".

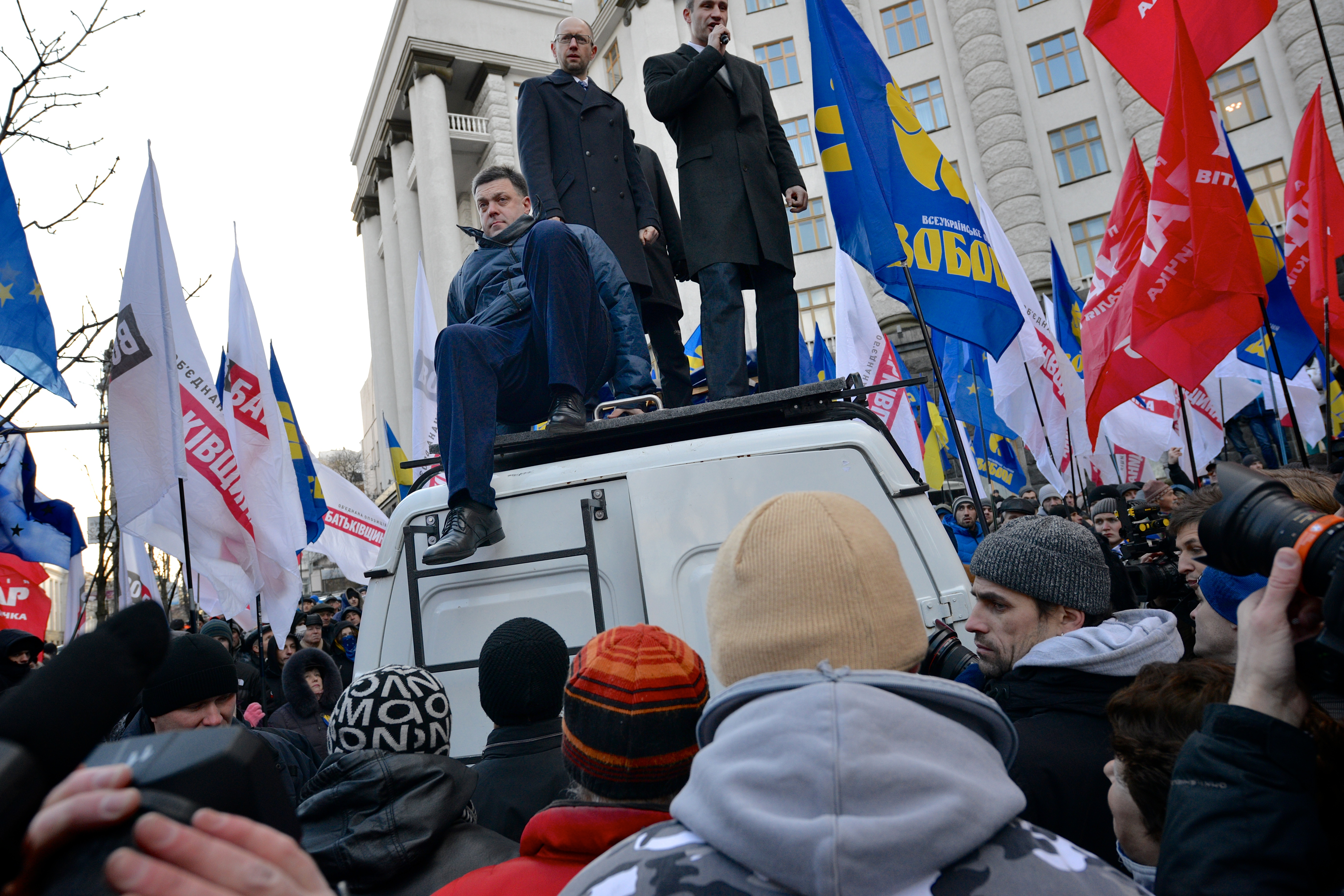
Opposition leaders Yatsenyuk, Vitali Klitschko and Oleh Tyahnybok, addressing demonstrators, 27 November 2013

On 25 January 2014, Yatsenyuk was offered the post of prime minister by President Viktor Yanukovych but refused due to unmet demands. Yatsenyuk said the people should be making a decision for the future of Ukraine, not the present government officials.

=== Prime minister ===
==== First term (February–August 2014) ====
Yatsenyuk was designated as the new prime minister of the Yatsenyuk Government following the 2014 Ukrainian revolution that removed former president Viktor Yanukovych from power. The new government was sworn in on 27 February 2014. After his appointment, Yatsenyuk started to distance himself and his government from Russia, which accepted Crimea as an integral part of the Russian Federation after a disputed referendum there in response to the insurrection on Maidan Square and the ouster of Yanukovych. He described his government as being on a "kamikaze" mission.

On 21 March 2014, Ukraine signed the political part of the Association Agreement with European Union with the economical part of the treaty to be signed after the presidential election in May 2014. The day before, Yatsenyuk was replaced (due to his new position) as his party's faction leader in parliament by Sergei Sobolev.

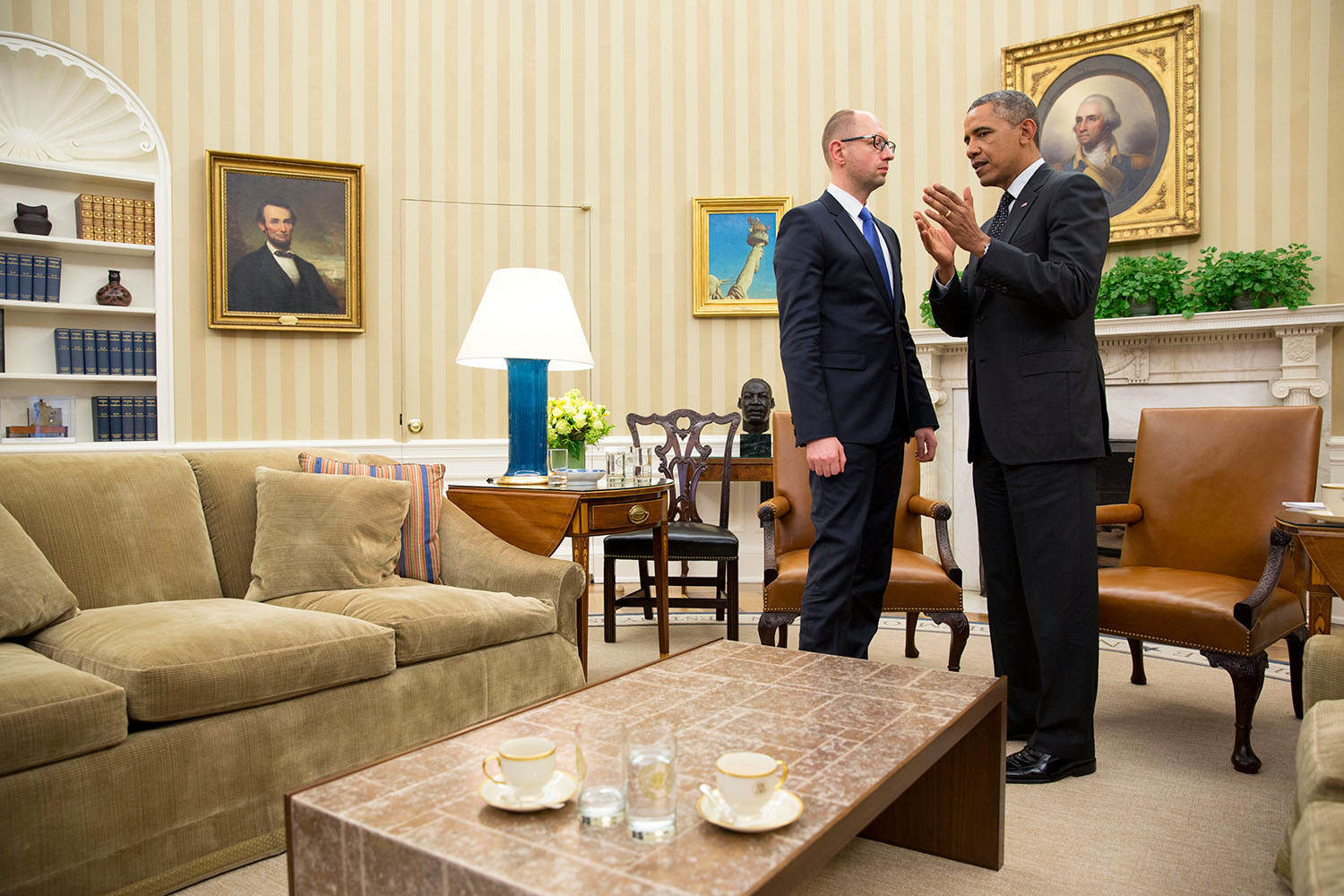
U.S. president Barack Obama talks with Arseniy Yatsenyuk in the Oval Office, 12 March 2014.

On 24 July 2014, Yatsenyuk announced that he was resigning from the post of prime minister immediately. Earlier that day the coalition supporting his Yatsenyuk Government had collapsed, after parliament failed to pass legislation to increase military financing and regulate energy matters. Yatsenyuk had told parliament "History will not forgive us ... how are we to pay wages, how are we tomorrow morning going to send fuel for armoured vehicles, how will we pay those families who have lost soldiers, to look after the army?" During his announcement of resignation in parliament Yatsenyuk hinted that the coalition had collapsed because politicians did not want to be seen involved in making budget cuts and had thus placed "political interest above the fate of the country"; according to him this was "a moral and an ethical crime". However, his resignation had yet to be officially accepted by parliament and they did not do this the day after his resignation. Instead MPs decided that their next meeting will be on 31 July 2014.

On 25 July 2014, the remainder of Cabinet had appointed Deputy Prime Minister for Regional Policy – Minister of Regional Development, Construction and Housing and Communal Services of Ukraine Volodymyr Hroisman as acting prime minister.

On 31 July 2014, the Verkhovna Rada declined his resignation because only 16 (of the 450) MPs voted for his resignation.

In September 2014, Yatsenyuk started the new party People's Front. The party won 82 seats in the August 2014 Ukrainian parliamentary election.

==== Second term (August 2014 – April 2016) ====
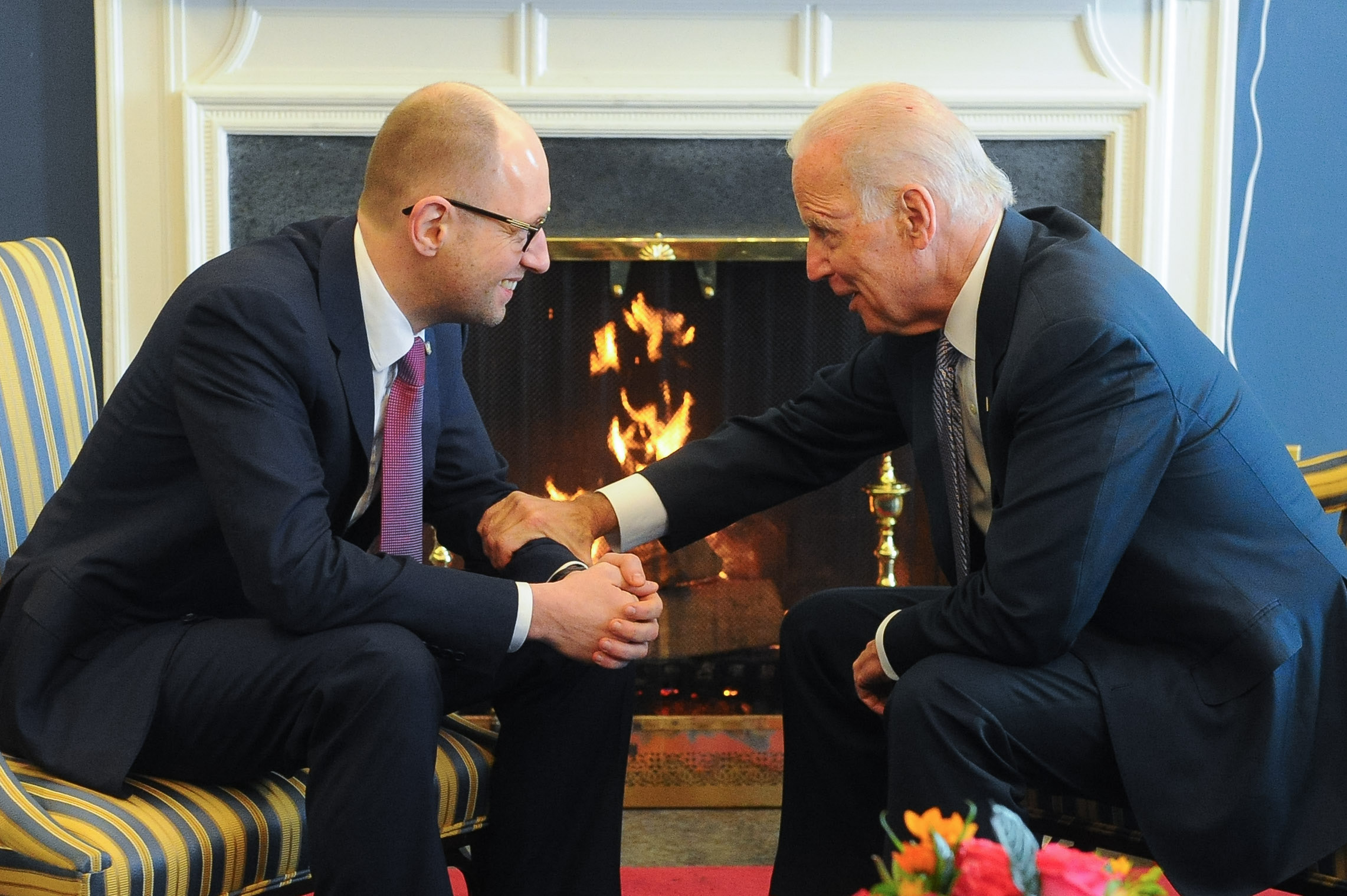
Joe Biden and Arseniy Yatsenyuk

Yatsenyuk was confirmed as prime minister at the first session of the new parliament by 341 votes.

In July 2015 Yatsenyuk announced with Canadian prime minister Steven Harper the successful conclusion of the Canada-Ukraine Free Trade Agreement.

February 2016 saw the start of Yatsenyuk's downfall as the prime minister of Ukraine after economy minister Aivaras Abromavičius announced his resignation claiming the government did not have a real commitment to fight corruption. On 16 February 2016, President Petro Poroshenko asked Yatsenyuk to resign and later on the same day, the Ukrainian parliament voted to find the work the Ukrainian cabinet was doing under Yatsenyuk unsatisfactory, but rejected calls for a vote of no confidence. On 17 and 18 February 2016, Fatherland and Self Reliance left the coalition supporting Yatsenyuk's government, meaning the coalition became 5 deputies short of the 226 needed.

On 10 April 2016, Yatsenyuk announced that he would report to parliament on 12 April and resign as prime minister. But parliament did not hold a vote on his resignation that day because (Yatsenyuk's party) People's Front and Petro Poroshenko Bloc could not agree on the forming of a new government. On 14 April 2016, parliament did hold a vote on his resignation resulting in Yatsenyuk being replaced by the new prime minister, Volodymyr Groysman, and his Groysman government. Yatsenyuk's party's People's Front remains in the coalition because (according to Yatsenyuk) "today it is the only way to defend the state".

=== Post-premiership ===
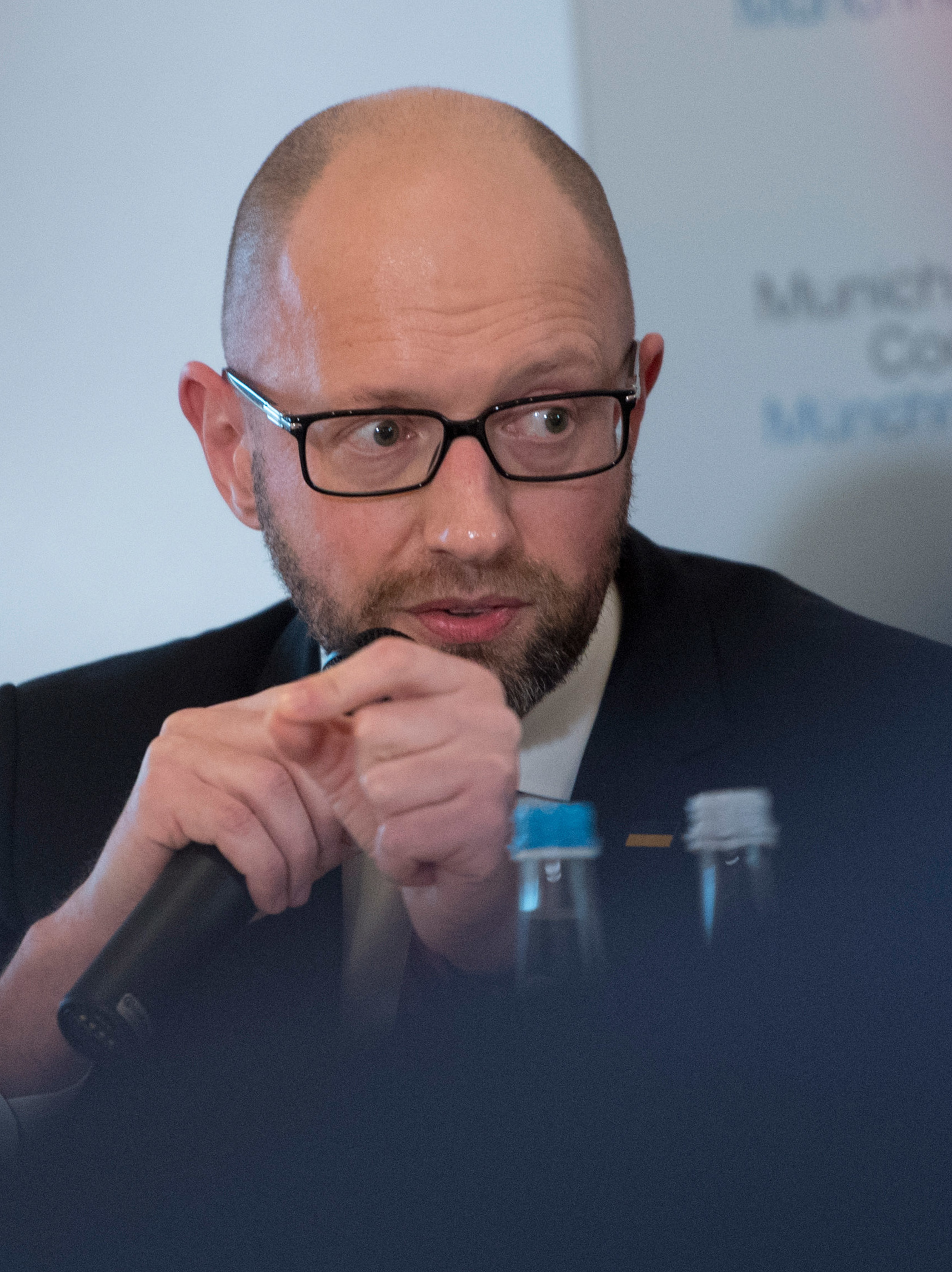
Yatsenyuk during the MSC 2017

On 2 December 2016 Oleksandr Onyshchenko, former Ukrainian MP, told The Independent that he had organized and funded a smear campaign against Yatsenyuk and his government (in Onyshchenko's own words, with "$30 million" of unclear origin). According to Onyshchenko, then-President Poroshenko had initiated this anti-Yatsenyuk defamation campaign, and benefited from it politically.

In August 2017, Yatsenyuk acquired 30% of Goldberry LLC, the owner of Espreso TV. In December 2017, Yatsenyuk sold his share of the Espresso TV channel to an American company.

In 2020, using the Index for Monitoring Reforms, VoxUkraine compared the performance of the last four Ukrainian Cabinets. VoxUkraine claimed that Yatsenyuk's second government had made the most progress in governmental reforms, including anti-corruption ones, as laws on a number of anti-corruption bodies were adopted at that time.

During the Prelude to the 2022 Russian invasion of Ukraine, Yatsenyuk called Russia the "biggest threat" and criticized Zelenskyy's handling of the crisis.

On the July 2022 signing of the Black Sea Grain Initiative, Yatsenyuk told Times Radio that "I don't trust any kind of deal signed with the Russian Federation, we had dozens of different deals, and they always violate them." And within hours after Defence Minister Sergei Shoigu's signature on the UN-brokered deal to resume Ukraine's Black Sea grain exports, a missile had hit the Port of Odesa.

In his August 2022 Times Radio interview Yatsenyuk alleged that the Russian Armed Forces intended to use the winter weather against Ukraine. At the time, Russia controlled almost half of the Ukrainian energy supply when the Russian seizure of the Zaporizhzhia Nuclear Power Plant was added to their control of the Naftogaz supply.

== Political positions ==
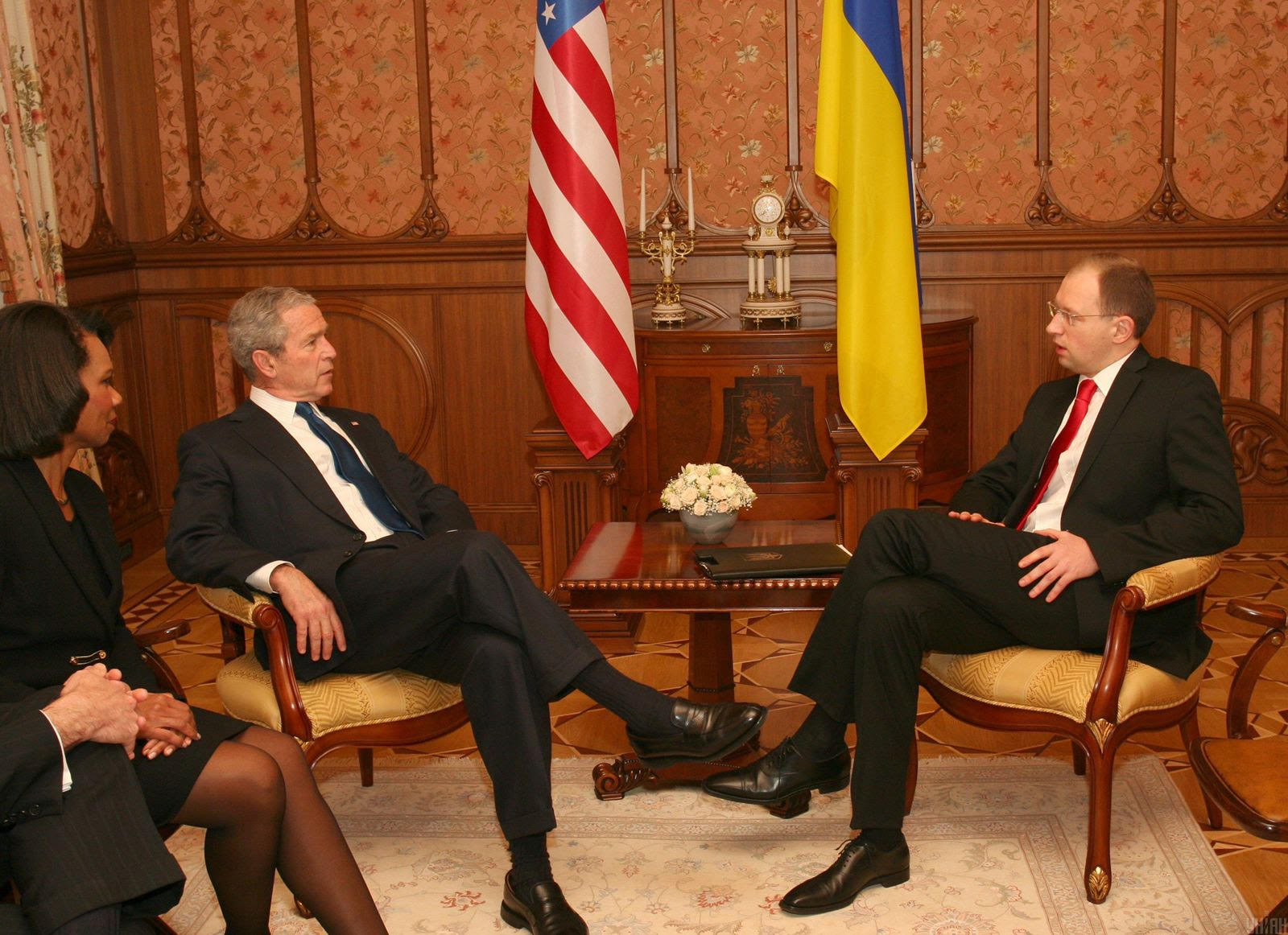
George W. Bush, Condoleezza Rice, and Arseniy Yatsenyuk in January 2007

“Ukraine is still not a democracy”

— Yatsenyuk during the Yalta European Strategy conference 2011, when Viktor Yanukovych was the president of Ukraine

In 2009 Yatsenyuk made clear that he does not want Russian to become the second state language in Ukraine.

As early as 2012 Yatsenyuk wanted European Union membership for Ukraine. and he sees this "because this means standards and values – a [high] level of education, medical treatment, pensions, employment, freedoms, new technologies, and progress". Yatsenyuk stated late 2009 that in its relations with the European Union, Ukraine should have a visa-free regime with EU countries. Yatsenyuk stated on 20 April 2012 that it was clear to him that the European Union will not sign the association agreement "until fully fledged democracy is resumed in Ukraine, free and fair elections are held, and the political persecution of opponents is stopped in Ukraine".

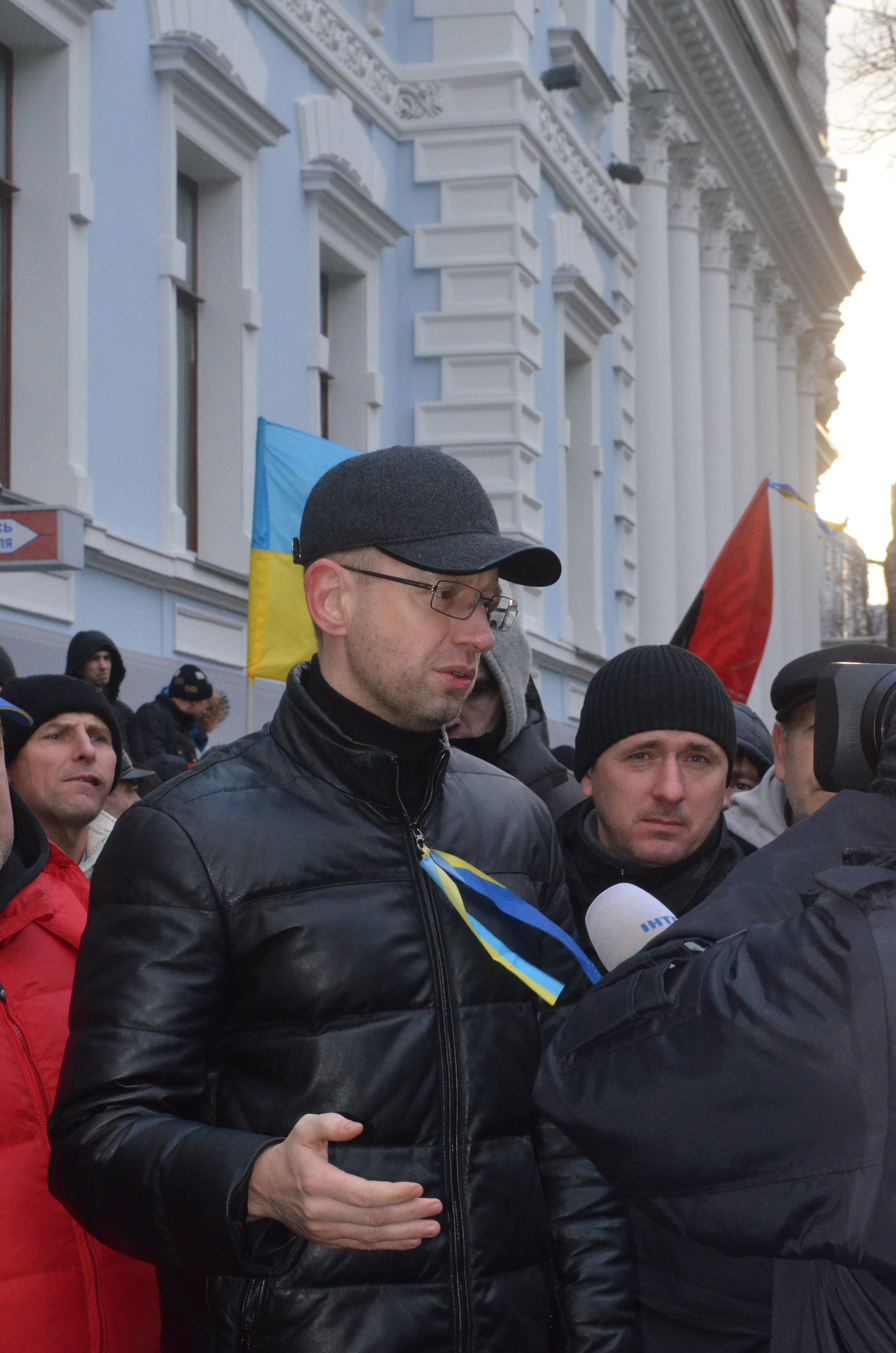
Euromaidan: the blockade of the Government of Ukraine, December 2013

In 2012 Yatsenyuk registered that he disfavoured Ukraine joining the Eurasian Customs Union; according to him "Ukraine's joining the Customs Union means the restoration of the Soviet Union in a slightly different form and with a different name. But this means that the country will become a part of the Russian empire. We know history. We have been there and we don't want to return there".

On 21 August 2013, Yatsenyuk stated "Russia has decided for some reason that it can be the architect of a new Berlin Wall. And, according to Russia's design, this wall should appear at the border between Ukraine and the European Union".

In November 2009 Yatsenyuk favoured the creation of a special "vice prime minister for Crimean issues".

In April 2010 Yatsenyuk called for the Kharkiv Pact for the lease of the naval base in Sebastopol not to be endorsed by parliament. It was signed in April 2010 by then-president Viktor Yanukovych. The Russian lease on naval facilities in Crimea would be extended beyond 2017 by 25 years with an additional five-year renewal option (to 2042–47) in exchange for a multiyear discounted contract to provide Ukraine with Russian natural gas.

In November 2009, Yatsenyuk stated that Ukraine's shadow economy "is a part of the current political system in Ukraine and that's why taking business out of the shadows will only be possible via a change in this system". In November 2009 he said that his most difficult task if elected President would be "to break the political clan system that has been built up over the last 18 years". Yatsenyuk wants to create a common energy company with European Union countries and Russia.

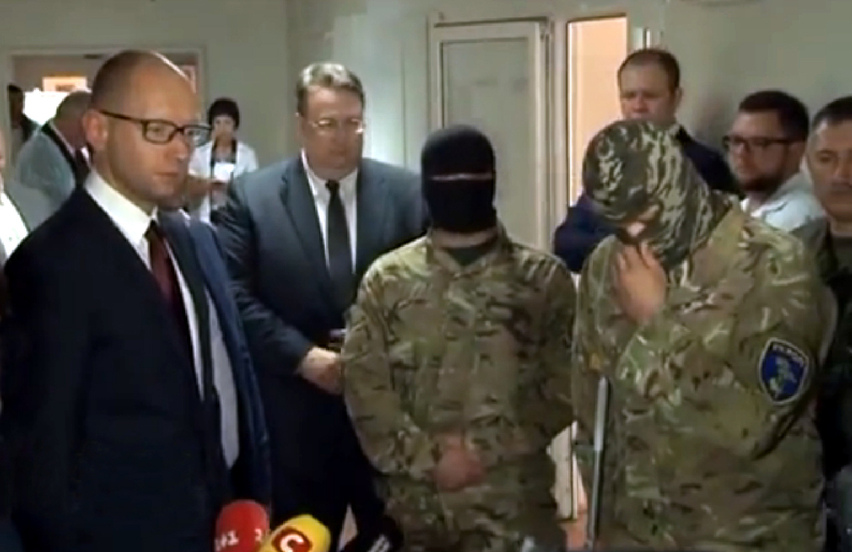
Yatsenyk with Donbas Battalion

According to Yatsenyuk in 2010, it would be impossible to fight corruption without changing the country's system of government, "The system of government in Ukraine has in fact remained the same as it was under the Soviet Union".

In late July 2010, Yatsenyuk wrote a draft law which proposed to fine officials for violating the law "On Appeals by Citizens", thus holding officials personally accountable for ignoring the complaints of citizens.

In November 2009, he proposed that a referendum be held on if Ukraine should have an open list voting system. Yatsenyuk is in favour of holding referendums; he calls this "nationalization of state power". The amendment of the terms and conditions of the Russian Black Sea Fleet's presence in Ukraine and a decision on Ukraine's membership of NATO and other military alliances are according to Yatsenyuk only possible through a referendum.

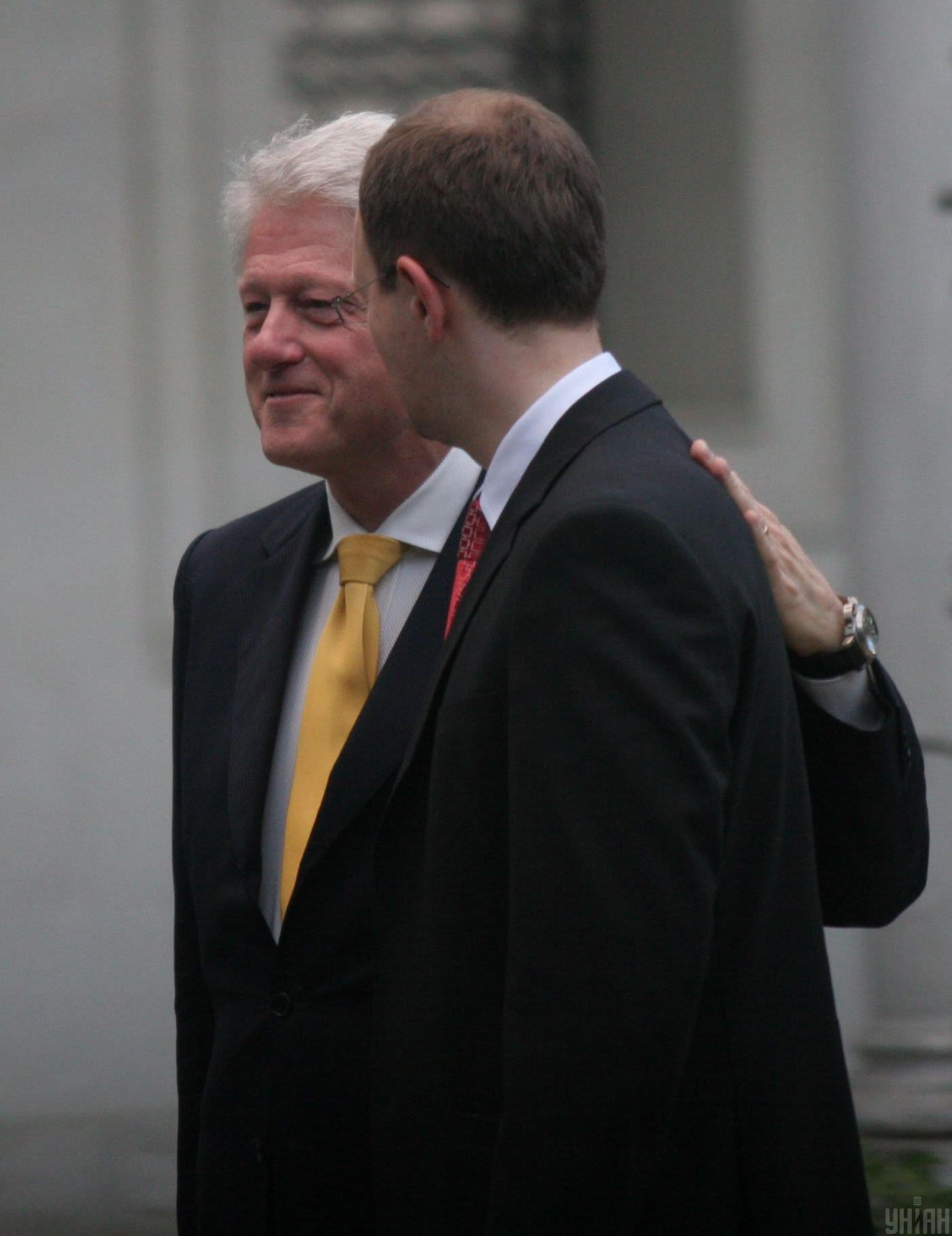
Bill Clinton and Arseniy Yatsenyuk

In January 2015, Yatsenyuk appeared on the German television channel ARD for an interview with Pinar Atalay. The interview's live translation contained a controversial statement that was immediately picked up by Russian media and later spread to other media outlets. The statement typically featured was a variation of "All of us still clearly remember the Soviet Union invading Ukraine and Germany. And nobody has the right to rewrite the results of the Second World War. And that is exactly what Russia's President Putin is trying to do." Implying that Yatsenyuk said that it was the USSR who started the war against Germany and not the other way around, this later turned out to be a misrepresentation meant to further the Russian political objectives in Ukraine. The actual statement by Yatsenyuk was "Russian aggression against Ukraine is an encroachment on the world order. We all remember well the Soviet invasion both in Ukraine, including, and in Germany. It must be avoided. Nobody is allowed to rewrite the results of the Second World War." Referring the post World War 2 soviet occupation of both Ukraine and East Germany and attempting to draw the parallels between the actions done by Soviets during that period to the present Russian aggression. This was clarified by Ukrainian officials and Yatsenyuk himself.

Yatsenyuk had stated that convicted politicians Yulia Tymoshenko and Yuriy Lutsenko should be released from jail and he had proposed/written laws to make this happen. (Note: Yuriy Lutsenko was released from prison on 7 April 2013 because Ukrainian president Viktor Yanukovych pardoned him (among others) for health reasons.) He also believed their convictions were a "difficult obstacle on Ukraine's path to the European Union." In early December 2012, he stated that he was ready to open a dialogue with the authorities only after Tymoshenko and Lutsenko were released.

In April 2016 Yatsenyuk stated that full transparent privatization of state property is needed, with the exception of strategic companies. In his address to the citizens Yatsenyuk also stood for the appointment of independent executives of all public companies and exposure to deprivation of all political forces.

In April 2016 Yatsenyuk stated that a "strict policy towards any aggressor country which in this case means the Russian Federation" is needed. "No deals and compromise at the expense of Ukraine. The restoration of the territorial integrity of the Ukrainian State. The return of Donetsk, Luhansk and Crimea. And the extension of sanctions against the Russian Federation until Ukraine has completely restored its territorial sovereignty," – he said.

== Family ==
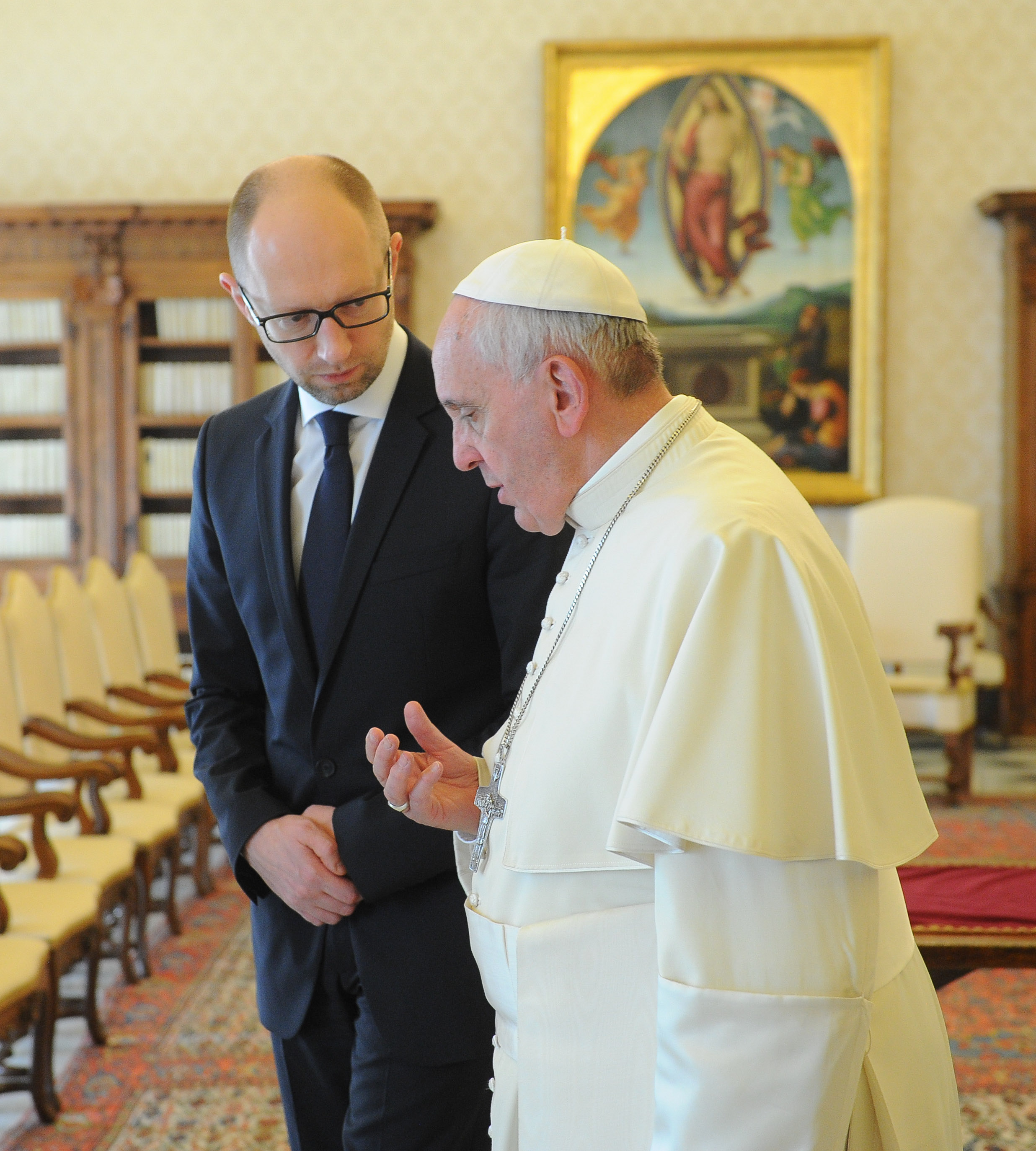
Pope Francis and Arseniy Yatsenyuk

Yatsenyuk's wife is Tereza Viktorivna (b. 1970); they have two daughters named Khrystyna and Sofiya. Tereza Yatsenyuk was born into a family of philosophers. Her father, Viktor Illarionovych Gur, was a professor of philosophy at the Kyiv Polytechnic Institute; her mother Svitlana Mykytivna, PhD, was retired. Yatsenyuk's family has lived near Kyiv (the village of Novi Petrivtsi, Vyshhorod Raion) since 2003. Yatsenyuk's sister Alina Petrivna Steel died on August 14, 2024, in the city of Santa Barbara, California United States at the age of 56.

== Open Ukraine and Kyiv Security Forum ==
Arseniy Yatsenuk heads the Open Ukraine Foundation, an international foundation based in Ukraine. It was established in July 2007 for the "strengthening and development of Ukraine's reputation in the world." Open Ukraine works with the young generation of artists, scholars and community leaders who seek to implement social changes in the different regions.

The Kyiv Security Forum was established by the Arseniy Yatsenyuk Open Ukraine Foundation in 2007. The forum is an annual event that acts as a platform for high-level discussion on relevant matters of national security as well as security in the Black Sea region, Europe and globally.

The annual Kyiv Security Forum has become a leading regional platform for discussion that creates an opportunity for the exchange of views on global security in an atmosphere of open and informal dialogue. The Forum brings together representatives of governments and independent experts, representatives of regional and global organizations, influential intellectuals, politicians, academics and journalists.

As of April 2014 Open Ukraine was partnered with the NATO Information and Documentation Centre, the United States Department of State, the National Endowment for Democracy, the German Marshall Fund and Chatham House, among other organizations.

Since the beginning of Russia's full-scale aggression on 24 February 2022, Open Ukraine Foundation has been providing assistance to the Ukrainian army and people in the regions most affected by the war. More than ₴30 million in aid has already been provided.

On 1 December 2022, the Open Ukraine Foundation held the annual international Kyiv Security Forum in the Ukraine's capital. Among the forum's participants were the president of the NATO Parliamentary Assembly Joëlle Garriaud-Maylam; the United States Under Secretary of State Victoria Nuland; President of the European Council in 2014-19 Donald Tusk, the Ambassadors of G7 countries to Ukraine.

== Controversies ==
=== Support by United States government ===
Arseniy Yatsenyuk was described positively by Victoria Nuland. On 4 February 2014, a recording of a phone call between her and U.S. ambassador to Ukraine, Geoffrey Pyatt was published on YouTube, showing the United States government supporting President Yanukovych's offer to make Yatsenyuk Prime Minister of Ukraine.

=== Russian criminal charges ===
On 28 April 2017, Russia's National Bureau of Interpol requested that Yatsenyuk be put on the international wanted list relating to his alleged involvement in attacks on Russian servicemen in 1994-1995, and in 2000 Russia's North Caucasian republic of Chechnya, that a Yessentuki city court had previously (on 21 February 2017) issued an in-absentia international warrant for his arrest alleging his violation of three articles of the Criminal Code of Russia; namely that he participated in an armed group, including intentional murder.

Yatsenyuk called the charges a "total absurdity", with Ukrainian government's Interior Minister Arsen Avakov admitting (on 29 April 2017) that Interpol sent him a copy of the Russian request (he claimed was "politically motivated") and Ukrainian Justice Minister Pavlo Petrenko stating that he believes Interpol will dismiss Russia's request.

On 3 May 2017 Interpol officially dismissed Russian request such as not conforming with Article 3 of Interpol constitution.

The story of Yatsenyuk's alleged involvement in the Chechnya War has been widely ridiculed in Ukraine and became a subject of internet memes.

== Awards ==
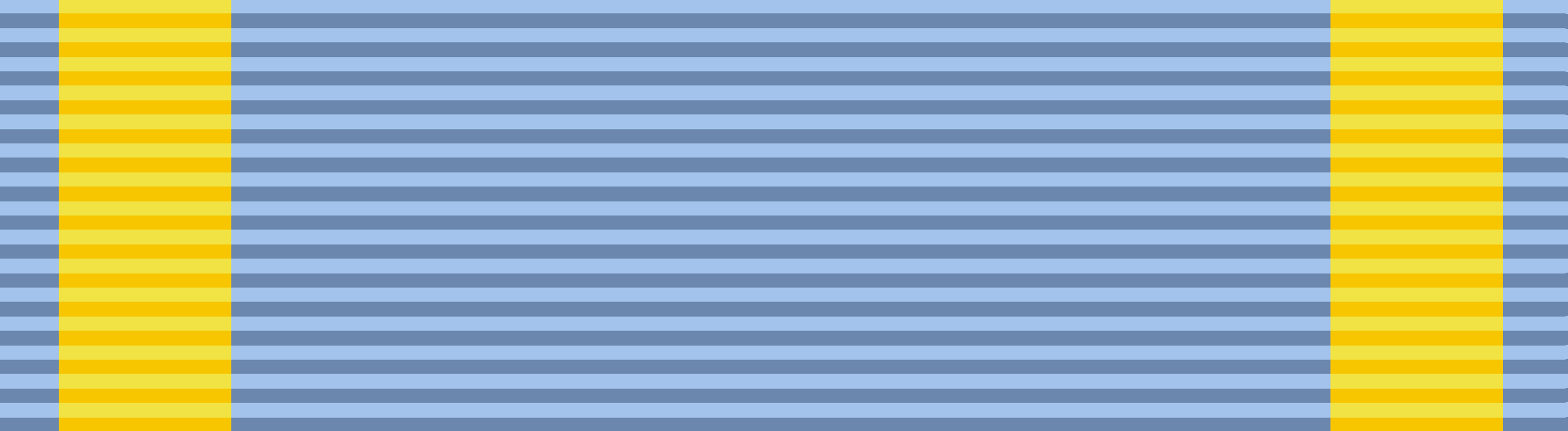
- Cavalier of the Order of Prince Yaroslav the Wise Fifth Class – awarded on 7 February 2008 for significant personal contribution to the integration of Ukraine into the World Trade Organization
- Medal "For the Glory of Chernivtsi" (2008)
- Cavalier of the Order of Prince Yaroslav the Wise Fourth class. Awarded on June 19, 2017 for significant personal contribution to the implementation of Ukraine's European integration programs, the introduction of a visa-free regime by the EU, strengthening the international authority of the state.

== Notes ==
Political offices
Preceded by Volodymyr Ohryzko; Acting	Minister of Foreign Affairs; 2007	Succeeded by Volodymyr Ohryzko
Preceded by Oleksandr Moroz	Chairman of the Verkhovna Rada; 2007–2008	Succeeded by Oleksandr Lavrynovych; Acting
Preceded by Oleksandr Turchynov; Acting	Prime Minister of Ukraine; 2014–2016	Succeeded by Volodymyr Groysman
