= Open Ukraine Foundation =

Philanthropic foundation

Open Ukraine Foundation is a nonpartisan international philanthropic foundation established in July 2007 by Arseniy Yatsenyuk and Zbigniev Drzymala to support public diplomacy and raise the profile of Ukraine internationally. It is also for strengthening and development of Ukraine's reputation in the world.

== Mission ==
Our tasks:

- Improving international reputation of Ukraine and increasing its promotion abroad.
- Promoting international cooperation with Ukraine and public diplomacy.

Our motto – "Open Ukraine for yourself and for the world"

Open Ukraine for yourself

- In Ukraine, we are working with a young generation of artists, scholars, and community leaders who seek to implement social changes in different regions. Ukrainian youth have great potential and we are trying to strengthen it.

Open Ukraine for the world

- We support contemporary art initiatives and present them to the Ukrainian and international communities. The Open Ukraine Foundation promotes information distribution about the best examples of modern visual arts and literature from Ukraine within the European cultural space.
- We see Ukraine as a potential regional leader in security. The Annual Kyiv Security Forum and the regular meetings of the Diplomatic Club are powerful platforms for international cooperation and for development of public diplomacy of Ukraine.

== Founders ==
Arseniy Yatseniuk

Arseniy Yatseniuk is Ukrainian politician, economist and lawyer. Head of "People's Front" Parliamentary Faction in the Parliament of Ukraine. The Prime Minister of Ukraine.

Arseniy Yatseniuk was born on May 22, 1974, in Chernivtsi. In 1996 he graduated from Law Department of Yuriy Fedkovych Chernivtsi National University and in 2001 he graduated from Chernivtsi Trade-Economics Institute with degree on accounting and auditing. In 2004 he received the degree of Candidate of Economic Sciences.

From 2005 to 2006 Mr. Yatseniuk served as Minister of Economy of Ukraine; later he was Foreign Minister of Ukraine in 2007 and Chairman of the Verkhovna Rada from 2007 to 2008. From 2009 to 2012 he was the Leader of the political party "Front for Change". From June to December 2012 he was the Head of the Council of the United Opposition.

Zbigniew Drzymała

Zbigniev Drzymala, 58 years old, is the director and main shareholder of the Financial and Industrial Group "Inter Groclin". Since 2000 Mr. Drzymala has been investing in the Ukrainian economy, launching the Groclin Karpaty plant in Uzhgorod and employing over 1000 workers. Since 2008 he has been developing industry in the Dolyna town in the Ivano-Frankivsk Oblast.

Mr Drzymala is a winner of the President of Poland's economics award. He was also awarded the Leader of Polish business statuette. Zbigniev Drzymala is president of the soccer club "Groclin-Dyskobolia" SSA, and is Honorary Consul of Ukraine in Poland in Zielona Góra town.

== Management ==
Supervisory Council:

- Tereziya Yatseniuk, Head of Supervisory Council
- Andriy Kurkov, writer
- Mykola Riabchuk, essayist, Ukrainian Centre of Cultural Research

Board of Management:

- Roman Shpek, Vice President and First Deputy Chairman of Alfa Bank
- Svitlana Voytsehovska, member of Parliament of Ukraine
- Natalya Hrebennyk, Associate Professor, Department of Banking, the University of Banking of the National Bank of Ukraine
- Danylo Lubkivsky, Advisor to the Prime Minister of Ukraine (2014–2016), Deputy Foreign Minister of Ukraine (2014).

== Open Ukraine programs ==
=== International Dialogue ===
The program International Dialogue is aimed at ensuring the participation of Ukraine in the European discourse on key political, security and socio-economic issues and to deepen understanding by the international community of the processes taking place in Ukrainian society.

The target audience of the program:

- civic organizations
- think tanks
- mass media
- political and business elite.

==== Kyiv Security Forum ====
Annual event on the issues of European security and a platform for regional and global organization representatives along with government and independent experts to debate and discuss solutions to both soft and hard European security issues, including regional conflicts, illegal migration, energy security, organized crime, refugees, border management, corruption, terrorism, conventional and nuclear weapons proliferation, human trafficking, etc.

Aim of the Forum:

- establishing an independent forum for discussion of strategic vision for addressing global security issues;
- strengthening cooperation and dialogue in the field of security between the EU and the Black Sea Region;
- impact on policy-making process in Ukraine.

Websites of the Kyiv Security Forum:

Kyiv Security Forum (2007–2015) — http://ksf.openukraine.org,

Kyiv Security Forum 2016 — http://ksf2016.openukraine.org,

Kyiv Security Forum 2017 — http://ksf2017.openukraine.org/en,

Kyiv Security Forum 2018 — http://ksf2018.openukraine.org/en

==== Youth Kyiv Security Forum ====
Youth Kyiv Security Forum is a platform for discussion by young experts of current issues of international relations and foreign policy of Ukraine.

Aim of the Forum:

- strengthening the role of the new generation of experts, enhancing their abilities to participate in the process of policy analysis and development.

==== Diplomatic Club ====
The Diplomatic Club is an informal forum on foreign policy for Ukrainian officials, businessmen, ministers of foreign affairs, independent analysts and international journalists. At the center of open debates are global developments and foreign choices facing Ukraine and the other countries.

=== Cultural Horizons ===
The program Cultural Horizons presents cultural achievements of modern Ukraine abroad and contributes to the strengthening of cooperation between cultural environment of Ukraine and the other European countries.

For impartial and non-engaged final decisions making process on financing, the Foundation established the Program Board, consisting of:

- Andrey Kurkov, writer, the chairman of the Program Council
- Yuriy Onuh, contemporary artist, curator, director of the Polish Institute in New York City
- Yevhen Solonin, photo-critic
- Mykola Ryabchuk, essayist, researcher in Ukrainian Centre for Cultural Research

==== The Book Fund ====
The Book Fund is a grant program for translation of contemporary Ukrainian literature. The Foundation Open Ukraine is the only foundation in Ukraine, which provides grants for the translation of modern Ukrainian literature into foreign languages. Translations of domestic works improve Ukraine's image in the world, contribute to the establishment of cross-cultural understanding and exchange of cultural values.

==== Travel grants for artists ====
The Foundation Open Ukraine provides travel grants for travel costs for Ukrainian artists to exchange artistic experience at the international level and to improve cooperation between Ukrainian and foreign artists. These grants give Ukrainian artists the opportunity to present their achievements around the world.

Grantees are chosen monthly based on the decision of the Program Council.

==== The Art Club Faces ====
Art Club Faces, launched by Arseniy Yatsenyuk Foundation Open Ukraine in partnership with creative space Chasopys is a platform for communication and exchange of experience of Ukrainian and foreign writers, musicians, artists, designers, filmmakers, photographers and other cultural representatives. The project aims at promoting contemporary art among young people, enabling communication with the already known and new faces in the cultural field.

=== Young Leaders ===
The program Young Leaders aims at helping young people to implement projects directed at introducing changes in Ukraine, and promote active youth, whose successful works focus not only on their own career, but also on the improvement of the society.

==== Discussion Club "Open World" ====
Discussion Club “Open World” is an educational project for socially active young people. Its goal is to raise a new generation of responsible leaders. Monthly the Foundation holds lectures with renowned experts, politicians and public figures, during which they discuss ways of effective solutions to social problems in Ukraine and the world.

==== Space of Change: Women Leaders ====
The program Space of Change: Women Leaders was aimed at supporting young, active and successful women who work to improve life in the country and implement projects that help their local communities. Participants of the program were 32 bright, original and successful women under 35.

=== Open Yourself ===
"Open Yourself" program aimed at personal development and strengthening of individual education. The objective of the program is an extension of new knowledge and ideas for self-development promotion and promotion of civil society development in Ukraine.

Within the program there are public lectures, meetings, trainings with specialists in various spheres which are held to help public learn more, understand and discover themselves.
