= Hnylytsi =

Rural locality in Ternopil Oblast, Ukraine

Hnylytsi Гнилиці
- Location in Ternopil Oblast
- Coordinates: 49°41′32″N 26°5′26″E
- Country: Ukraine
- Oblast: Ternopil Oblast
- Raion: Ternopil Raion
- Hromada: Skoryky rural hromada
- Time zone: UTC+2 (EET)
  - Summer (DST): UTC+3 (EEST)
- Postal code: 47820

Hnylytsi (Ukrainian: Гнилиці) is a village in Skoryky rural hromada, Ternopil Raion, Ternopil Oblast, Ukraine.

== History ==
The first written mention of the village was in 1463.

After the liquidation of the Pidvolochysk Raion on 19 July 2020, the village became part of the Ternopil Raion.

== Religion ==
- Church of the Intercession (1905, architect Vasyl Nahirnyi).

== Notable people ==
- Mykhailo Soroka (1911-1971), Ukrainian political activist

== Sources ==
- (in Ukrainian) Лашта В., Ханас В., Гнилиці // Ternopil Encyclopedic Dictionary: in 4 v. / editorial board: H. Yavorskyi and other, Ternopil: "Zbruch", 2004, V. 1: А—Й, S. 370. — ISBN 966-528-197-6.
- "Hnilice". Geographical Dictionary of the Kingdom of Poland (in Polish). 3. Warszawa: Kasa im. Józefa Mianowskiego. 1882. p. 82.
