= Kateryna Zarytska =

Ukranian nationalist activist

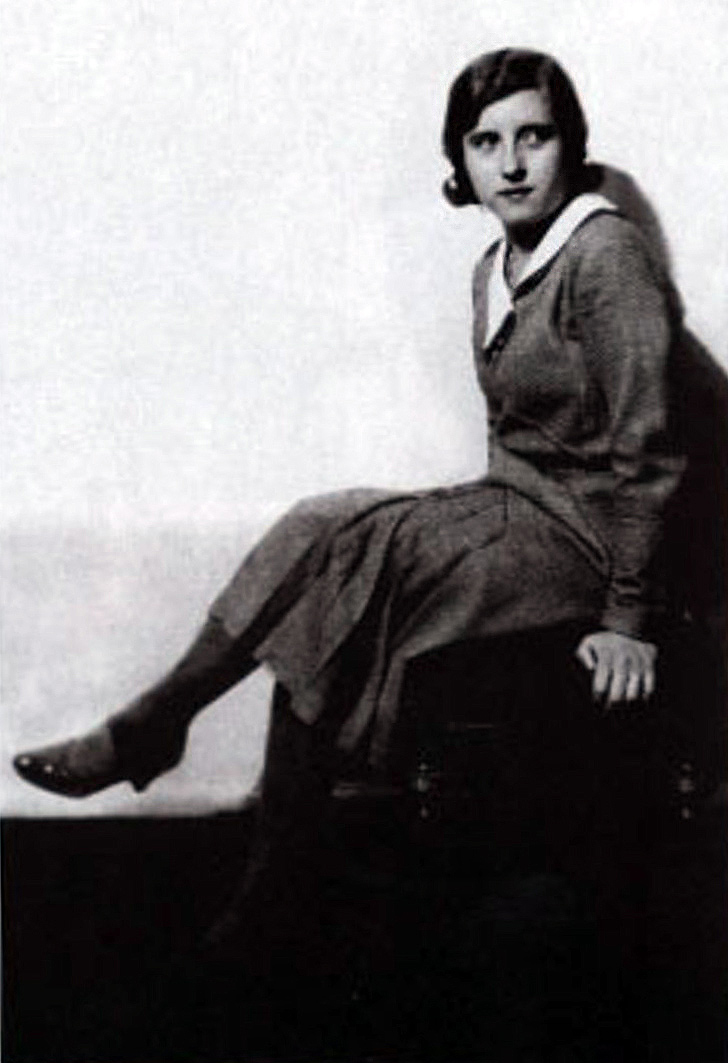
- Zarytska in 1930
- Born: 3 September 1914; Kolomyia, Galicia, Austria-Hungary
- Died: 29 August 1986 (aged 71); Volochysk, Ukrainian SSR, Soviet Union
- Resting place: Lychakiv Cemetery
- Education: Lviv Polytechnic; Lysenko Music Institute
- Spouse: Mykhailo Soroka
- Father: Myron Zarytskyi

Kateryna Myronivna Zarytska (Ukrainian: Катерина Миронівна Зарицька; married name Zarytska-Soroka; 3 November 1914 – 29 August 1986) was a Ukrainian nationalist activist, member of the Organization of Ukrainian Nationalists (OUN), and organizer of the Ukrainian Red Cross during World War II. She served as a courier and confidante of Roman Shukhevych, commander-in-chief of the Ukrainian Insurgent Army (UPA). Zarytska spent more than three decades of her life in Polish and Soviet prisons and labor camps for her underground activity.

== Early Life and Education ==
Zarytska was born on 3 November 1914 in Kolomyia, then part of the Austro-Hungarian Kingdom of Galicia and Lodomeria. Zarytska was the daughter of Myron Zarytsky, a notable Ukrainian mathematician. Zarytska attended a private girls' gymnasium run by the Basilian Sisters in Lviv from 1925 to 1932, after which she enrolled at the Lviv Polytechnic to study mathematics, also attending the Lysenko Music Institute, where she studied piano. Zarytska's first arrest was at age 20, her first prison sentence was at age 21.

In 1930 Zarytska joined the OUN's youth network, "Yunatstvo", through which she distributed banned nationalist literature. She later worked as a propaganda officer for the organization's youth wing. From 1932 she belonged to a five-member combat-reconnaissance cell of young women affiliated with the OUN's Homeland Executive.

== The assassination of Bronisław Pieracki and the Warsaw Trial ==
On 15 June 1934, an OUN operative assassinated Bronisław Pieracki, an officer of the Polish Minister of Internal Affairs, in retaliation for the Polish government's "pacification" campaign against Ukrainians in Galicia. Zarytska was accused of helping organize the assassin's escape to Czechoslovakia and was arrested by Polish police on 8 November 1934.

Zarytska stood trial in the "Warsaw Trial" (18 November 1935 – 13 January 1936), one of the largest prosecutions of OUN members. She was convicted and sentenced to eight years' imprisonment. Zarytska was released in August 1939, she was later arrested again by the Soviet NKVD in March 1940.

== World War II and postwar arrest ==
Following Operation Barbarossa Zarytska was released from Soviet prison, from 1941 to 1947 Zarytska served as the director of the Ukrainian Red Cross Society and wrote for "Idea and Action" (Ukrainian: Ідея і Чин), a periodical for the OUN. Zarytska was arrested again in 1947 in Khodoriv after killing Soviet agents, she was sentences to 25 years of imprisonment until April 1969 and was imprisoned at Vladimir Central Prison. Likewise, Zarytska's husband, Mykhailo Soroka, was imprisoned at Dubravlag ZhKh 385/17A, a Gulag labor camp.
