= Bohdan Soroka =

Ukrainian artist (1940-2015)

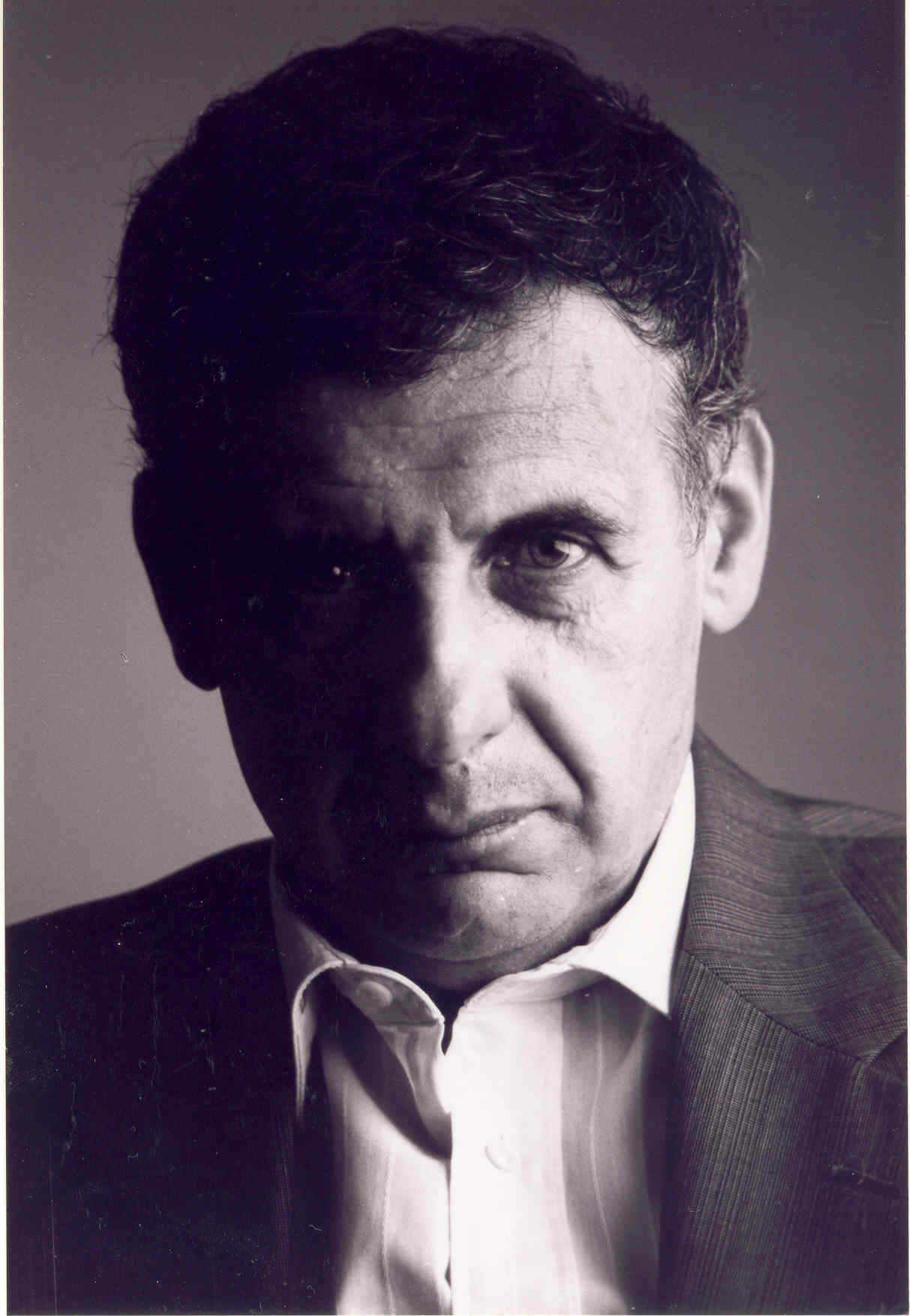
- Born: 2 September 1940; Lviv, Ukraine
- Died: 9 April 2015 (aged 74); Rzeszów, Poland
- Occupation: Graphic art

Bohdan Soroka (Ukrainian: Богдан Сорока; 2 September 1940 – 9 April 2015) was a Ukrainian graphic artist. He worked in black-and-white, and later in his life added color linocut technique. His work in graphic arts is characterized by its expressionistic style and imaginative pictorial representations. Soroka exhibited in Ukraine, England, Germany, France, Poland, Canada, and the United States. He received first prize at the International Ex Libris Competition in Vilnius in 1989, and was a founder and the first chair of the graphic department at the Lviv National Academy of Art.

He was also known as a major collector of Hutsulian folk art, especially wooden candelabra, of which he had the largest collection in Ukraine. His Memoirs are currently a bestseller in Ukraine. They were included on a list of the ten best contemporary Ukrainian biographical prose works.

== Biography ==
Bohdan Soroka was born in Lviv, Ukraine on September 2, 1940 in Brygidky prison, where his mother was a political prisoner held by the Soviets. Bohdan Soroka was raised by his grandparents, mathematician Myron Zarytsky and his wife Volodymyra, since his parents, Kateryna Zarytska and Mykhailo Soroka, were both serving time in the Gulag as a Soviet political prisoners.

Soroka graduated from the Lviv National Academy of Arts in 1964 and associated himself with the dissident political and artistic movement of the 1960s, which blossomed in Ukraine after the death of Stalin.

== Death ==
Bohdan died during a medical procedure on April 8, 2015 in Rzeszów, Poland.

== Career ==
His first print, created in 1969, were used as illustrations in the book of poetry by a friend of his, Ihor Kalynets. As a consequence, Soroka's art was banned from public exhibits by the Soviet government for more than a decade. Nevertheless, he continued to work and create new prints in his small apartment in Lviv, where he resided with his grandmother, his wife Lyubov Soroka, and two daughters, Solomia and Ustyna. During this time of artistic oppression, Soroka created many of his now-famous print series, including Slavic Mythology, emblems and Symbols, Angels and Musicians, The Four Seasons, Lviv Architecture and March of the Gnomes. At that time he also gathered his collection, the largest in Ukraine, of Hutsulian trijci (wooden candelabras made by the Hutsuls, an ethnic group living in the Carpathian mountains).

During the “perestroika” period, and after Ukraine gained its independence in 1991, Bohdan Soroka actively joined the artistic life of the new state. Personal exhibits were held in Ukraine, Canada, the United States, France, England, and Germany. In 1993 he was invited to be on the faculty of the Lviv National Academy of Art, and in 1996 he created the Industrial Graphics Department in this institution, and became its first chair, He worked there until 2006. He was a recipient of the Order for the Intellectual Bravery from the Independent Cultural Magazine “Ї” in 2012.

Soroka often drew inspiration for his works from Ukrainian folklore, evident in his print series such as “Folkloric Motifs” (1969), “Slavic Mythology” (1970-1972), “Kupalo Festival Games” (1974), and “Proverbs” (1976).

== Exhibitions ==
- Lviv National Art Gallery
- Taras Shevchenko Museum
