= Constitutional Assembly of Ukraine =

The Constitutional Assembly of Ukraine (Ukrainian: Конституційна Асамблея, romanized: Konstytutsiina Asambleia) is a special auxiliary agency under the President of Ukraine set up in May 2012 by President Viktor Yanukovych for drawing up bills of amendments to the Constitution of Ukraine; the President then will table them in parliament. The Constitutional Assembly is set to include 100 members. As of December 2012 the Constitutional Assembly includes 94 people.

== Members ==
The Constitutional Assembly is designed to include 100 members. Most members are scientists. There are twelve places reserved for all current parliamentary factions and groups, each of them can nominate one candidate for membership at the assembly. Six of the twelve places are foreseen for members of the ruling party and the parties that support it, and six more places are foreseen for opposition politicians. Apart from the parliamentary forces, the parties that received more than 100,000 votes at a last presidential or parliamentary elections have a right to nominate their members.

- Chairman - Leonid Kravchuk
- Deputy chairman - Yuriy Shemshuchenko
- Secretary - Maryna Stavniychuk

== History ==
On 13 January 2011 President Viktor Yanukovych stated that a Constitutional Assembly would be established soon. On 17 May 2012 the assembly was officially established and Ukraine's first President Leonid Kravchuk was appointed to chair the assembly in May 2012. As of December 2012 there are no opposition representatives member of the assembly as they refused to join. This despite calls by President Yanukovych to join. As of December 2012 the Constitutional Assembly consists of 94 people.
