= Ukrainian parliamentary elections =

Ukrainian parliamentary elections determine the composition of the Verkhovna Rada for the next five years.

== List of parliamentary elections ==
- 1918 Ukrainian Constituent Assembly election
- 1938 Ukrainian Supreme Soviet election
- 1947 Ukrainian Supreme Soviet election
- 1951 Ukrainian Supreme Soviet election
- 1955 Ukrainian Supreme Soviet election
- 1959 Ukrainian Supreme Soviet election
- 1963 Ukrainian Supreme Soviet election
- 1967 Ukrainian Supreme Soviet election
- 1971 Ukrainian Supreme Soviet election
- 1975 Ukrainian Supreme Soviet election
- 1980 Ukrainian Supreme Soviet election
- 1985 Ukrainian Supreme Soviet election
- 1990 Ukrainian Supreme Soviet election
- 1994 Ukrainian parliamentary election
- 1998 Ukrainian parliamentary election
- 2002 Ukrainian parliamentary election
- 2006 Ukrainian parliamentary election
- 2007 Ukrainian parliamentary election
- 2012 Ukrainian parliamentary election
- 2014 Ukrainian parliamentary election
- 2019 Ukrainian parliamentary election
- Next Ukrainian parliamentary election

== See also ==
- Elections in Ukraine
