= Mykhailo Soroka =

- Михайло Сорока
- Born: March 27, 1911; Velyki Hnylytsi, Zbarazh county, Kingdom of Galicia and Lodomeria, Austria-Hungary
- Died: June 16, 1971 (aged 60); Prison Camp No. 17, Mordovia, Russian SFSR, Soviet Union
- Resting place: Lychakiv Cemetery
- Education: Prague Polytechnic
- Occupations: Political activist, member of the Organization of Ukrainian Nationalists
- Spouse: Kateryna Zarytska (married 1939)
- Children: Bohdan Soroka

Mykhailo Soroka (Ukrainian: Михайло Сорока; 27 March 1911, Velyki Hnylytsi near Zbarazh, Galicia - 16 June 1971, Camp No. 17, Mordovia, Soviet Union) was a Ukrainian political activist and member of the Organization of Ukrainian Nationalists. He spent 34 years in imprisonment and exile by Polish and Soviet authorities.

== Biography ==
=== Early years ===
Mykhailo Soroka was born on 27 March 1911 in the village of Velyki Hnylytsi (modern-day Ternopil Oblast, Ukraine). His mother Hanna was aged 19 at the time of his birth, and her husband Mykhailo, after whom the boy was named, had died two months prior. Soon thereafter Hanna left the child, and young Mykhailo was cared for by his maternal grandparents. At the age of eight he entered a local primary school, and at the age of 13 became a student at the Ukrainian Gymnasium in Ternopil. Soroka's favourite subject at school was mathematics, and he also engaged in sports and became a member of Plast society.

At the age of 15, with the help of his uncle, a pedagogue and former officer of the Ukrainian Galician Army, Soroka moved to Czechoslovakia, where he studied at a Ukrainian gymnasium in Řevnice. There he continued to be active in sports and sang in a school choir. After graduating Soroka entered the Prague Polytechnic to study architecture. He also received additional training in sculpture. During his studies in 1934-1935 Soroka was in contact with Ukrainian émigré artists, among them Robert Lisovskyi.

In Prague Soroka continued his activities in the Plast and joined the Sokil movement. In summer 1935, while on a scouting trip to Hoverla, he delivered forbidden nationalist literature from Prague across the border. Twice, in 1933 and 1937, Soroka was detained by Polish authorities for illegally crossing the border, and was suspected to be a member of OUN. After the second arrest he was sentenced to four years imprisonment in Stanislaviv, Bereza Kartuska and Grodno.

=== Imprisonment and underground activities ===
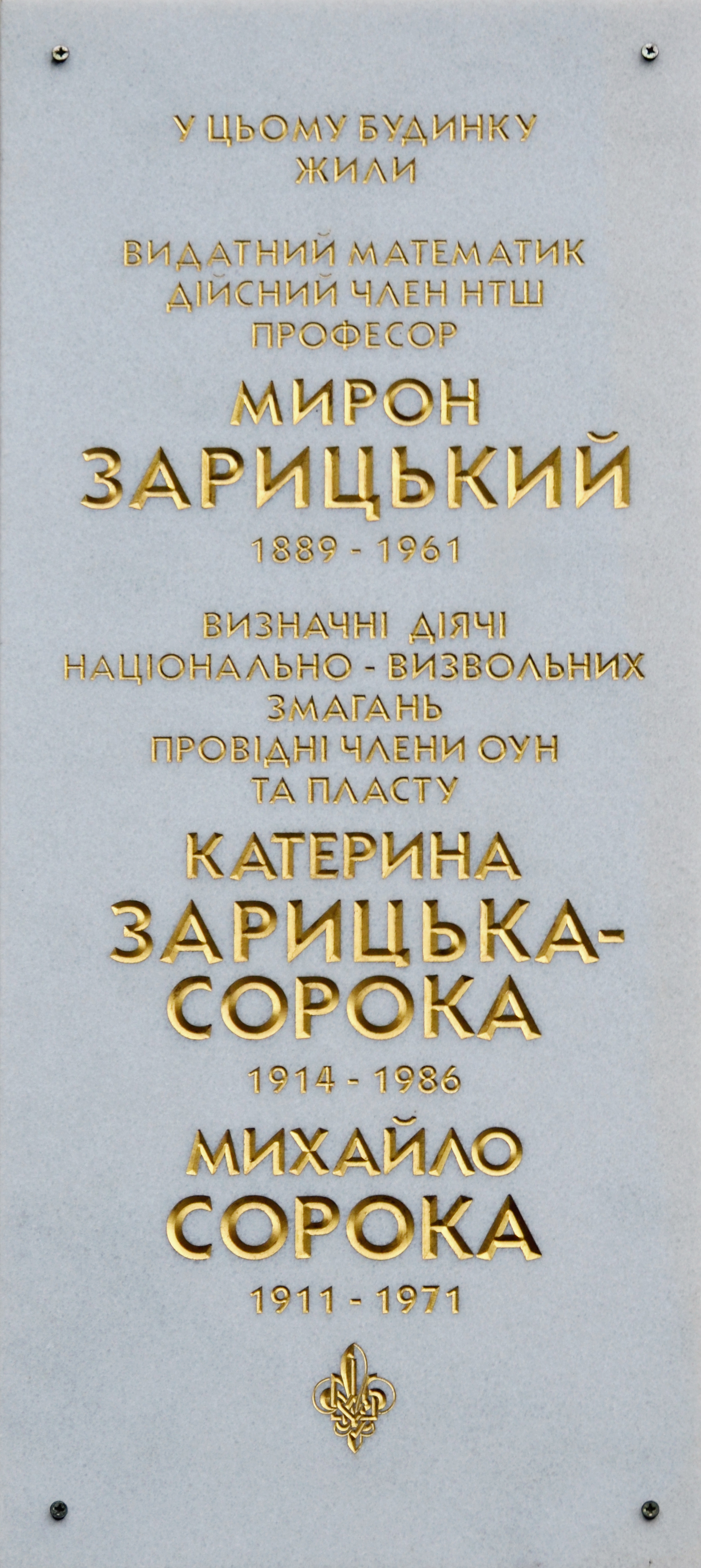
Memorial plaque on the building in Lviv, where Soroka and his wife Kateryna Zarytska lived in 1939-1940

After the start of the Second World War Soroka escaped the prison in Grodno and went on foot to Lviv. After the arrival of Bolshevik rule, in March 1940, he was arrested together with his wife on suspicion of being an active member of OUN. After spending two weeks in prison, Soroka was sentenced to eight years of prison camps and transported to Vladivostok. From there he arrived to Vorkuta, where in 1947 he created the clandestine organization OUN-North, which established ties with anti-Soviet underground in Ukraine.

Following the end of his prison sentence, Soroka was barred from moving to Ukraine and worked as a topographer in Vorkuta. After taking a vacation, in 1948 he travelled to Lviv, where he met his family and established contacts with the nationalist underground headed by Roman Shukhevych, delivering information on their activities back to Vorkuta.

In May 1949, during a new visit to Lviv, Soroka met the staff leadership of the Ukrainian Insurgent Army in the vicinity of Lviv. However, in July he was detained and sentenced to imprisonment beyond the Polar Circle, where he stayed until 1950. After his release, Soroka was exiled to Krasnoyarsk Krai. In 1952, while in exile, he was arrested again and sentenced to death penalty on accusations of treason, spying and preparations for an insurgency. The sentence was eventually replaced with 25 years of imprisonment.

In May 1954 Soroka was transported to Steplag, where a month later he participated in the Kengir Uprising, becoming one of its ideological leaders. Soroka authored a song, which became one of the anthems of the rebellion. Due to strict conspiracy, Soroka evaded being persecuted for being one of the revolt's organizers. He was later transferred to Tayshet, before ending up in a labour camp in Mordovia. While serving his sentence, Soroka led a prisoners' choir, organized literary readings, religious feasts, and even an art exhibition.

=== Later years and death ===
During the early 1960s the KGB attempted to recruit Soroka by transporting him to Lviv and Ternopil, where he was allowed to meet his family and visited the local theatre, museums and universities disguised as a "Canadian architect". However, he refused and was sent back to prison. Soon thereafter Soroka suffered his first heart attack. As his correspondence was heavily censored, Soroka's family expressed a wish to visit him in imprisonment. In June 1970 that wish was granted, with his son and daughter-in-law staying with him for three days under careful supervision of prison authorities. The next visit was planned to take place in one year, but on 16 June 1971 Soroka suffered another heart attack during a walk around the territory of the prison camp and died soon thereafter.

According to witnesses, a rose was planted on the place where Soroka suffered his fatal attack, and fellow prisoners, including Vasyl Stus, used to gather on the location. Seeing this, prison authorities removed the plant. Authorities failed to report Soroka's death to his family, and information about his demise became known to them from another prisoner who had been released. Moreover, even the location of Soroka's burial place was hidden from his relatives. Only in 1991, as part of the First Worldwide Congress of Ukrainian Political Prisoners, were the remains of Mykhailo Soroka and his wife Kateryna Zarytska reburied at Lychakiv Cemetery.

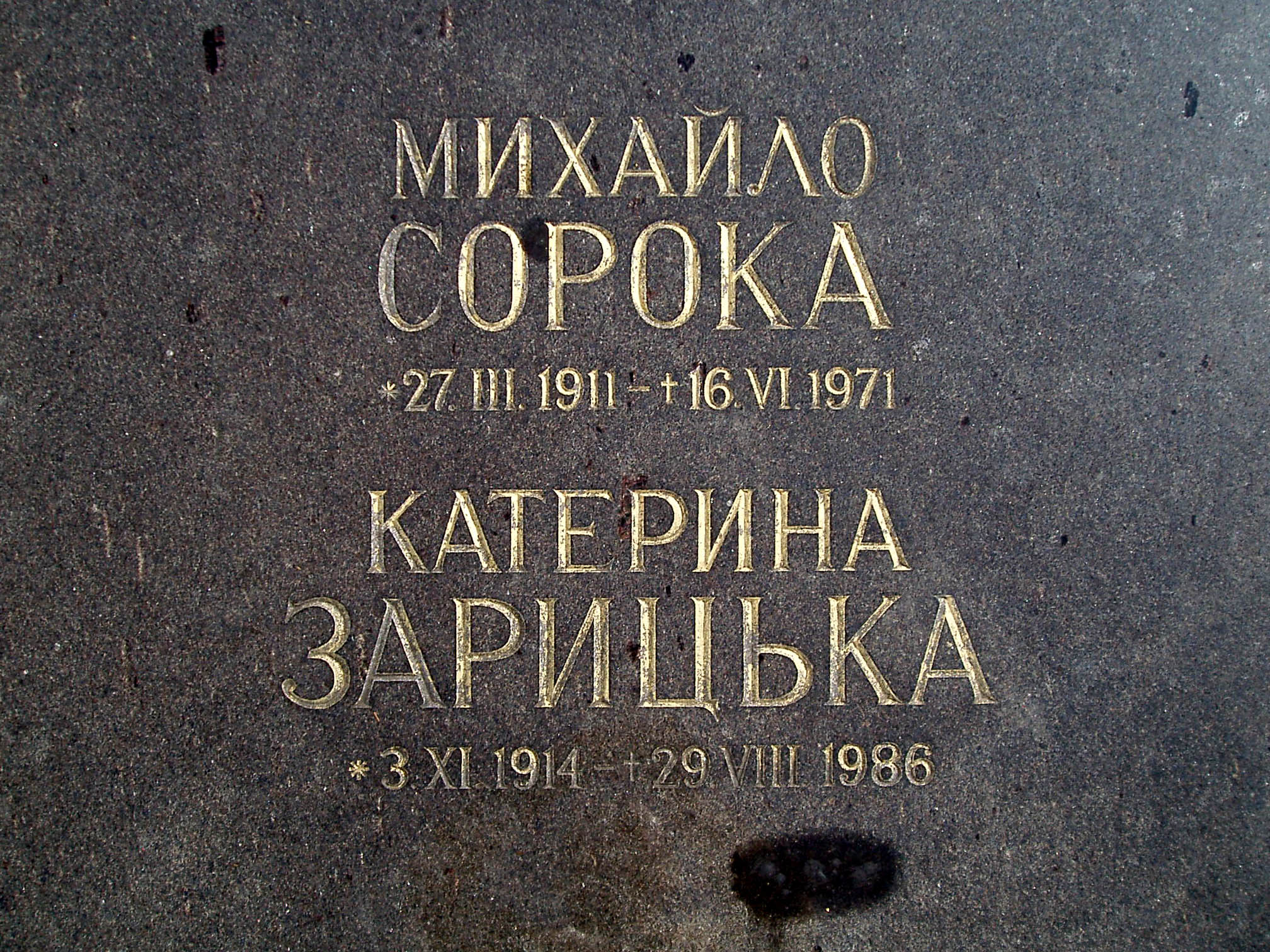
Grave of Mykhailo Soroka and Kateryna Zarytska in Lychakiv Cemetery

== Family ==
During his imprisonment in Stanislaviv prison, Soroka started a relationship with a fellow prisoner, Kateryna Zarytska, who was the daughter of his schooltime mathematics teacher and received a sentence for assisting the assassins of Polish interior minister Bronisław Pieracki. After escaping from imprisonment in Grodno, in October 1939 Soroka rejoined Zarytska in her father's house in Lviv, and on 5 November they married in St. George's Cathedral. Their son Bohdan was born in September 1940, while Kateryna was imprisoned by the NKVD in Brygidki prison.
