= Andrei Medvedev (politician) =

Russian politician and journalist

- Андрей Медведев

Member of the Moscow City Duma
- Incumbent
- Assumed office 8 September 2019
- Governor: Sergey Sobyanin

Personal details
- Born: 14 December 1975 (age 50) Moscow, RSFSR, Soviet Union
- Citizenship: Russian
- Party: United Russia
- Education: Moscow State University
- Occupation: Journalist, politician
- Awards: Order of Honour; Order of Friendship; Presidential Letter of Gratitude; TEFI

Andrei Andreevich Medvedev (Russian: Андрей Андреевич Медведев; born 14 December 1975, Moscow, USSR) is a Russian journalist and a politician. He is an employee of the All-Russian State Television and Radio Broadcasting Company (VGTRK) and serves as Deputy Director General for Radio Broadcasting. He is a member of the Moscow City Duma since 2019, and Vice Speaker since 2021. He is also an Honoured Journalist of the Russian Federation (2025).

== Early life and education ==
AndreI Andreyevich Medvedev was born on 14 December 1975 in Moscow. His father was a counter-intelligence officer. His mother, Saida Medvedeva (born 1953), is a television producer, director and screenwriter; she is a laureate of the "Lavr" awards (2006) and "TEFI" (2015), a member of the Russian Academy of Television (2010) and the creator of several pseudoscientific and political documentaries, such as Water (2006), Mold (2009), The President (2015) and World Order 2018 (2018).

Medvedev attended School No. 743 in the Koptevo District, graduating in 1992. During his school years, he became interested in journalism and published articles in the Vperyod! ("Forward!") newspaper in the Khimki District of the Moscow Oblast. In 1997, he graduated from the Faculty of Journalism at Moscow State University.

== Career in television and journalism ==
In 1996, Medvedev started working in television, initially developing a youth program for the MTK channel, though it never aired. That same year, he joined the Dorozhny Patrol ("Road Patrol") program on the TV-6 Moscow channel, working as a correspondent. From 1997, he worked on the program Vremechko ("Little Time"), and subsequently at NTV on programs such as Kriminal ("Crime"), Chistoserdechnoye Priznaniye ("Full Confession") and Segodnya ("Today"). In 2000, he joined VGTRK, working for the RTR television channel (later renamed Rossiya and then Rossiya-1). He frequently traveled to conflict zones, working as a war correspondent for the Vesti program in Chechnya, Kosovo, Serbia, Macedonia, Palestine, Iraq, Afghanistan, Pakistan and South Ossetia. From 2004 to 2005, he oversaw the Vesti. Dezhurnaya Chast program and served as deputy head of the broadcast production unit within the News Programming Directorate. He also contributed reports on an occasional basis to the program *Special Correspondent* (Spetsialny Korrespondent).

Since 2014, he has served as deputy director of the Vesti News Programming Directorate. In this role, he headed the Vesti-Moskva program until 2016, significantly influencing its news content and graphic design. From 2015 to 2017, he hosted the show Medvezhiy Ugol on the Vesti FM radio station. In 2017, he was elected secretary of the Russian Union of Journalists.

In 2017, he briefly hosted the program Special Correspondent, taking over from Yevgeny Popov. In his reports and appearances, he employed manipulative tactics—such as appealing to viewers' emotions—while denying the studio audience the opportunity to speak. Later that same year, he was appointed editor-in-chief of the unified editorial board for the electronic media group comprising Radio Rossii, Radio Mayak, Vesti FM and Radio Kultura. In 2018, the program Special Correspondent was cancelled; subsequently, from 2018 to 2019, Medvedev periodically hosted discussions on documentaries for the Rossiya-24 TV channel.

== Political career ==
On 8 September 2019 he was elected as a deputy to the 7th convocation of the Moscow City Duma representing Electoral District No. 9, which encompasses the Begovoy, Savyolovsky, Timiryazevsky and Khoroshevsky districts, as well as part of the Beskudnikovsky district. Although he ran as an independent candidate, his campaign received support from the Mayor's office and funding from entities linked to the United Russia party and the pro-government All-Russia People's Front. Following his election, he declined to join any "party factions," though he did not rule out participating in a deputy group composed of individuals "who genuinely want to work". He serves on the commissions for public associations and religious organizations, for culture and mass communications, and for environmental policy.

On 3 November 2021 he was elected Deputy Chairman of the Moscow City Duma (serving under Chairman Aleksei Shaposhnikov), replacing Nikolai Gubenko, who had passed away in August 2020.

=== Political positions ===
He is a member of the Public Council under the Main Directorate of the Ministry of Internal Affairs of the Russian Federation for the City of Moscow, and an academician of the Russian Academy of Radio. In 2014, he signed an "open letter to the Russian journalistic community" criticizing the imposition of sanctions against Dmitry Kiselyov, and in 2019, he signed a letter to Ukrainian president Volodymyr Zelenskyy requesting the release of Kirill Vyshinsky. He spoke in support of the construction of the Main Cathedral of the Russian Armed Forces, lectured cadets at the Strategic Missile Forces Academy on "returning to traditional, simple, universal human values, such as family", visited Luhansk in the territory of the unrecognized Luhansk People's Republic, and criticized comedians for making jokes about the death of Arsen Pavlov ("Motorola").

He is involved in propaganda activities. In 2015, he released the documentary film *Project "Ukraine" and subsequently published a book based on it titled The True History of the Russian and Ukrainian Peoples, in which he claimed that the Ukrainian state was created by Western nations specifically for anti-Russian purposes. In 2016, he released the book War of Empires: The Secret History of England's Struggle Against Russia, dedicated to the "Great Game", and in 2017, his two-part film The Great Game, covering the same topic, was released. In 2020, to mark the 75th anniversary of the victory in the Great Patriotic War, he released the film The Great Unknown War, in which he stated that "without the help of foreign states, Hitler would not have been able to unleash the war", arguing that Poland, Great Britain and France had "stained themselves through collusion with fascism," while the United States had financed Hitler and was not sincere in the subsequent fight against him.
