= Order of Honour (Russia) =

State award of the Russian Federation, since 1994

Order of Honour (орден Почёта)
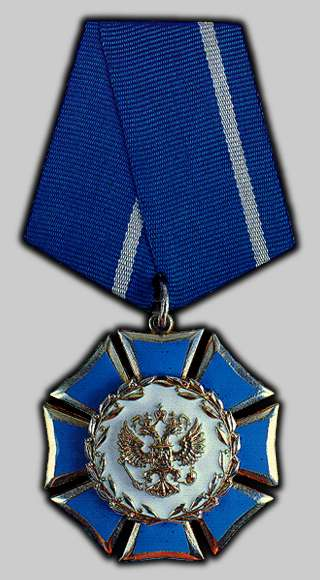
- Order of Honour
- Type: Single grade order
- Awarded for: High achievements in government, economic, scientific, sociocultural, public, sport and charitable activities
- Presented by: the Russian Federation
- Eligibility: Russian and foreign citizens
- Status: Active
- Established: March 2, 1994
- Ribbon of the Order of Honour

Precedence
- Next (higher): Order "For Merit in Culture and Art"
- Next (lower): Order of Friendship

The Order of Honour (Russian: орден Почёта, romanized: orden Pochyota) is a state order of the Russian Federation established by Presidential Decree No. 442 of March 2, 1994, to recognise high achievements in government, economic, scientific, sociocultural, public, sport and charitable activities. Its statute was amended by decree No. 19 of January 6, 1999, and more lately by decree No. 1099 of January 7, 2010, which defined its present status.

The award is the successor of the Soviet Order of the Badge of Honour (renamed Order of Honour in 1988).

== Award statute ==
The Order of Honour is awarded to citizens of the Russian Federation:

- For high achievements in production and economic indicators in industry, construction, agriculture, communications, energy and transport, coupled with the predominant use of innovative technologies in the production process
- For a significant increase in the level of socio-economic development of the Russian Federation; for achievements in modernizing the Russian health care system, aimed at significantly improving the quality of the provision of medical services, as well as the development and widespread practical applications of modern and innovative methods of diagnosing and treating diseases
- For achievements in scientific research resulting in significant Russian scientific and technological advantage in various fields of science, increased domestic production of competitive high-tech products
- For services to improve the Russian education system aimed at dramatically improving the quality of the education provided, the system of training specialists for the Russian economy and increasing international prestige of Russian educational institutions
- For significant contribution to the preservation, promotion and development of Russian culture, art, history and the Russian language, associated with increased levels of cultural and humanitarian development of civil and patriotic education of the younger generation
- For very fruitful public, charitable and community activities
- For merit in the promotion, and support of youth sports, as well as professional sport, considerably increasing the level of physical activity and making Russia a World leader in individual sports

The Order may also be conferred on foreign citizens who have performed outstanding service to improve bilateral relations with Russia.

The Order of Honour is worn on the left side of the chest and when in the presence of other medals and orders of the Russian Federation, is situated immediately after the Order "For Naval Merit".

== Award description ==
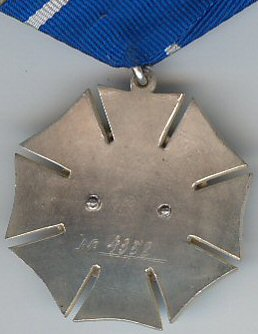
Reverse of the Order of Honour

The Order is struck from silver and covered with enamels, it is shaped as a 42 mm in diameter octagonal cross enamelled in blue on its obverse except for a 2 mm wide band along its entire outer edge which remains bare silver. The obverse bears a white enamelled central medallion bordered by a silver laurel wreath, the medallion bears the silver state symbol of the Russian Federation. On the otherwise plain reverse, two rivets and the award serial number at the bottom.

The Order of Honour is suspended by a ring through the badge's suspension loop to a standard Russian pentagonal mount covered by a 24 mm wide overlapping blue silk moiré ribbon with a 2.5 mm wide white stripe situated 5 mm from the ribbon's right edge.

== Notable recipients (partial list) ==
The individuals below are recipients of the Order of Honour" in alphabetical order, sorted by surname.

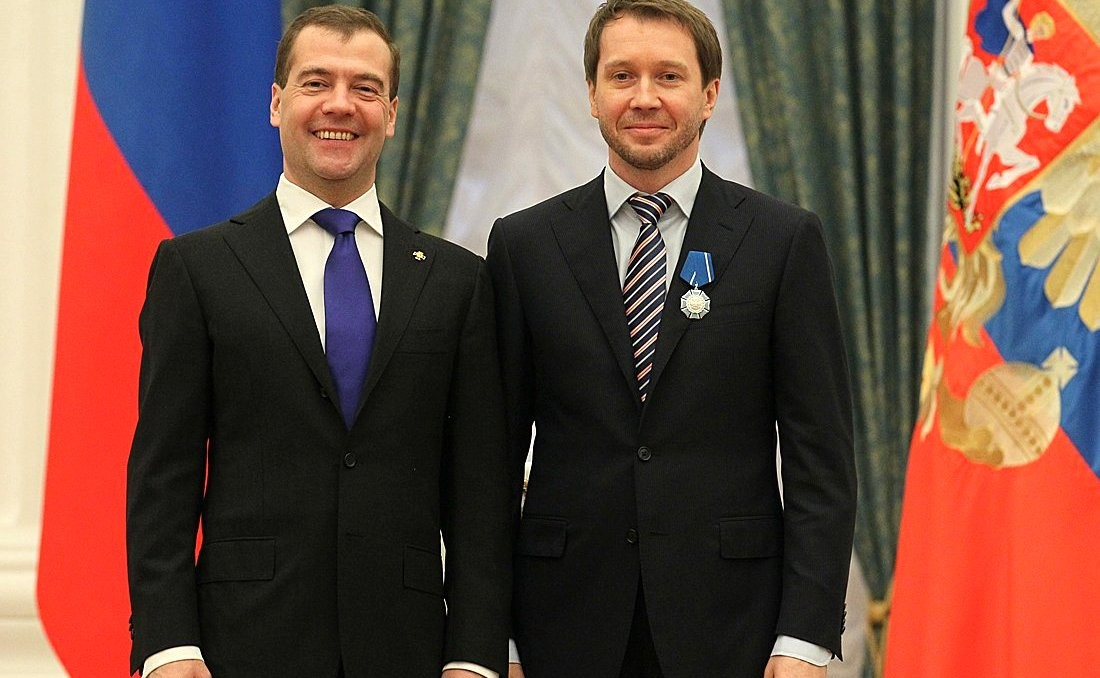
Evgeny Mironov, Artistic Director of the Federal State Institution of Culture "The State Theatre of Nations," being awarded the Order of Honour by President Dmitry Medvedev on December 29, 2011.

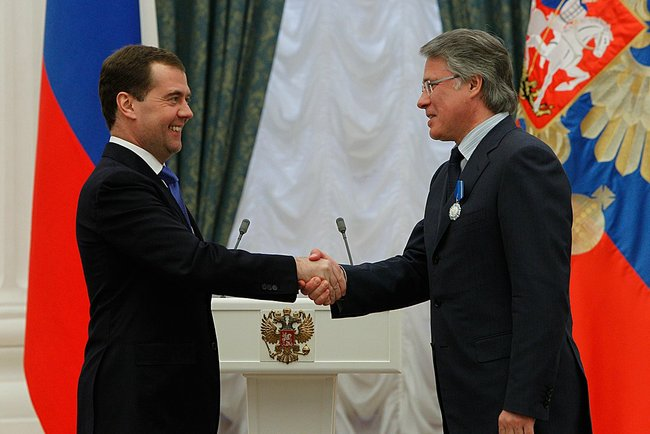
Anatoly Alexandrov, Rector of the "Bauman" Moscow State Technical University being presented with the Order of Honour by President Dmitry Medvedev on May 3, 2012.

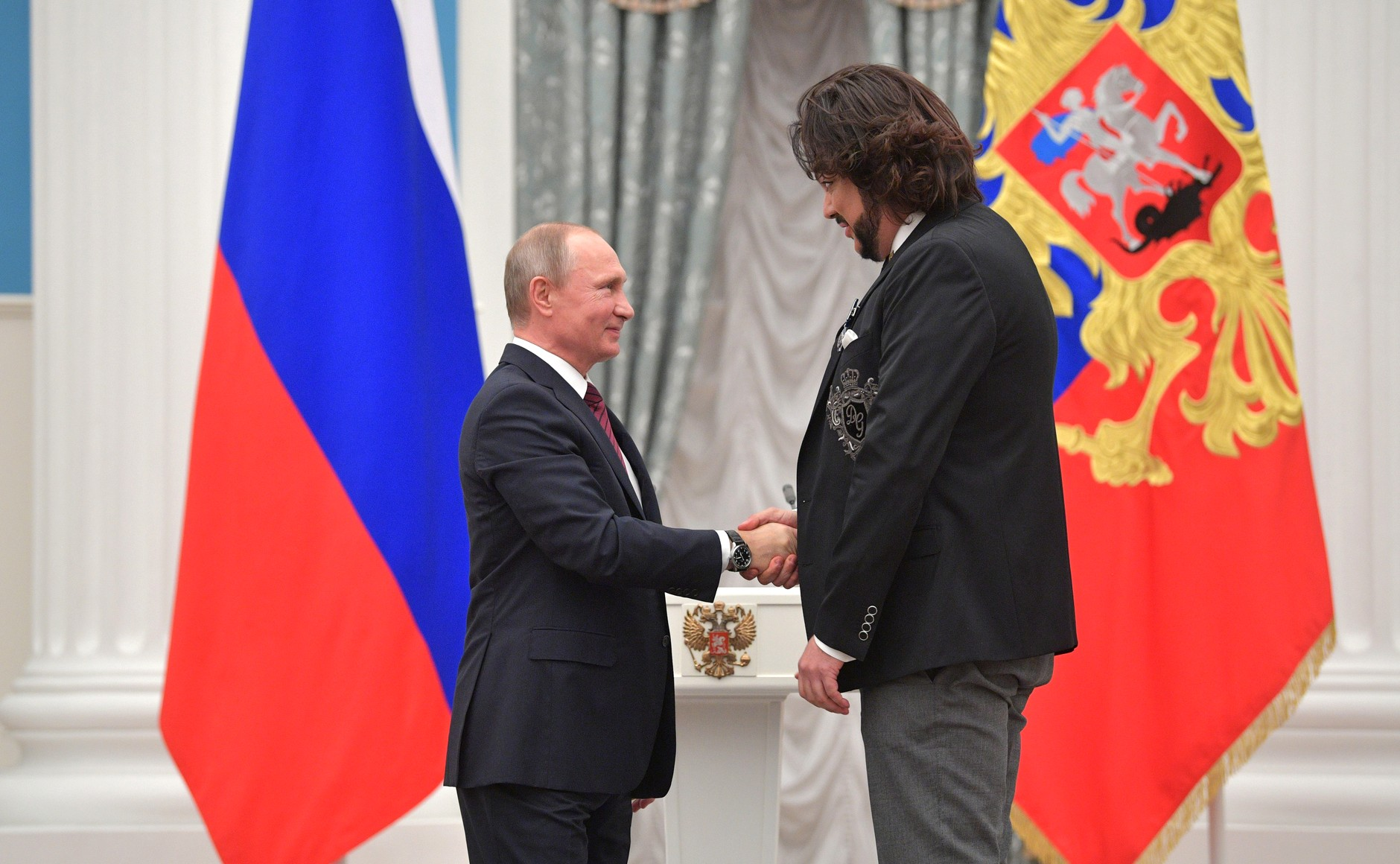
People's Artist Philipp Kirkorov being awarded the Order of Honour by President Vladimir Putin on November 15, 2017.

- Roman Abramovich, former owner of Chelsea F.C
- Ján Čarnogurský, former Prime Minister of Slovakia
- Yury Chaplygin, president of the National Research University of Electronic Technology in Moscow, Russia
- Larisa Dolina, singer
- Gennadiy Dulnev, scientist
- Viacheslav "Slava" Alexandrovich Fetisov, former Minister of Sport of Russia
- Mikhail Yefimovich Fradkov, former Prime Minister of Russia
- Valentina Gaganova, textile worker and politician
- Mikhail Golovatov, intelligence officer
- Mikhail Gorbachev, last General Secretary of the Communist Party of the Soviet Union, first and only elected President of the USSR
- Ernest Ivanter, ecologist and zoologist
- Moshe Kantor, Russian-Jewish peace activist
- Nikolai Kardashev, astrophysicist
- Valery Khalilov, Russian military conductor
- Tikhon Nikolayevich Khrennikov, composer, pianist and political activist
- Philipp Kirkorov, pop singer
- Sergei Konstantinovich Krikalev, Hero of the Soviet Union, Hero of the Russian Federation, and cosmonaut
- Berel Lazar, Chief Rabbi of Russian Federation
- Oleg Leonidovich Kuznetsov, current president of the Russian Academy of Natural Sciences
- Sergey Viktorovich Lavrov, diplomat, Russia's ambassador to the United Nations (1994–2004), Russia's Foreign Minister (2004–present)
- Valery Leontiev, pop singer
- Yury Mikhaylovich Luzhkov, former mayor of Moscow
- Muslim Mahammad oglu Magomayev, musician, singer
- Christophe de Margerie (posthumously), French entrepreneur, former CEO and Chairman of Total S.A.
- Andrei Medvedev (politician), television broadcaster and politician
- Arnold Meri, honorary chairman of the Estonian Anti-Fascist Committee (posthumously)
- Aliya Mustafina, artistic gymnast, two time Olympic Champion
- Sherig-ool Dizizhikovich Oorzhak, former leader of the Tuva
- Alexander Ovechkin, NHL ice hockey left winger, seven time Kharlamov Trophy winner
- Evgeny Plushenko, figure skater, Olympic Champion
- Pavel Romanovich Popovich, cosmonaut
- Vladimir Putin, former Director of the FSB (Holding the rank of Colonel in the KGB), former prime minister of Russia, and the 2nd and the 4th (current) President of Russia
- Anatoly Yuryevich Ravikovich, actor
- Aleksandr Yur'evich Rumyantsev, Member of State Duma, scientist, academic, and ambassador
- Juan Antonio Samaranch, Spanish sports administrator and seventh President of the International Olympic Committee
- Vitaly Gennadyevich Savelyev, Director General and former CEO of Aeroflot
- Viktor Petrovich Savinykh, cosmonaut
- Sergey Kuzhugetovich Shoygu, former Minister of Emergency Situations, Minister of Defense (2012–present)
- Andrei Vladimirovich Skoch (December 13, 2010), businessman, Deputy of the State Duma of the Federal Assembly of the Russian Federation of the III, IV, V, VI and VII convocations
- Sergey Tetyukhin, volleyball player
- Andrey Tokarev, Paralympic medalist
- Kassym-Jomart Tokayev, 2nd President of Kazakhstan
- Andrei Vasilevskiy, NHL ice hockey goaltender, Vezina Trophy winner, two-time Stanley Cup winner and Conn Smythe Trophy winner
- Yuli Mikhailovich Vorontsov, diplomat, former Russian Ambassador to the United States
- Dmitry Timofeyevich Yazov, Marshal of the Soviet Union
- Alexander Zaldostanov, leader of the Night Wolves
- Vladimir Volfovich Zhirinovsky, politician, Vice-Chairman of the State Duma

== See also ==
- Awards and decorations of the Russian Federation
- Order of the Badge of Honour (USSR)
- Order of Honour (Belarus)
- Order of Kurmet (Kazakhstan)
