= MIEE =

MIEE may refer to:

- Member of the Institution of Electrical Engineers
- Moscow Institute of Electronic Engineering, the English official name of National Research University of Electronic Technology in the 1990s.
