= Yury Chaplygin =

Russian academic (born 1951)

- Юрий Александрович Чаплыгин
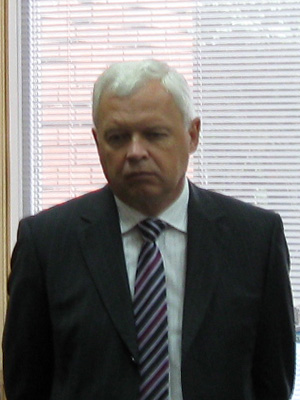
- Yuri Chaplygin in 2008
- Born: Yuri Aleksandrovich Chaplygin; June 12, 1951 (age 75); Kursk, USSR
- Education: Moscow Institute of Electronic Technology (MIET)
- Occupation: President of the National Research University of Electronic Technology (MIET)

Yuri Aleksandrovich Chaplygin (Russian: Юрий Александрович Чаплыгин) (born July 12, 1951) is a Russian academic administrator and researcher. He was the rector (1998-2016), when the president (2016-2026) of the National Research University of Electronic Technology (Moscow, Russia). He is an academician of the Russian Academy of Sciences.

== Early life ==
Chaplygin was born on July 12, 1951, in Kursk, USSR. He attended the National Research University of Electronic Technology (MIET), graduating in 1974 with honors from the Physics and Technology Department. He then completed his postgraduate studies, earning a Doctor of Engineering Science.

== Career ==
Chapygn is a physics scholar who specializes in integrated circuits, microsystem technology, nanotechnology, and sensors. He started his career as a junior research fellow and assistant to the chair of the Department of General Physics at the National Research University of Electronic Technology. In 1984, he was promoted to assistant vice-rector for research, followed by becoming the vice-rector for research in 1988.

Chapygn was elected to the position of rector of the National Research University of Electronic Technology in October 1998. He became the university's president in June 2016. Under his leaderhship, the university reorganized its departments and faculties. He also expanded the university's curriculum to include design, foreign languages, microsystems, nanotechnology, and telecommunications. He retired as university president in 2026.

Chapygn has published more than 200 articles in scientific publications. He serves on the editorial board of the News of Higher Education Institutions. Electronics as its editor-in-chief.

== Honors ==
Chapygn has received the Order of Honor and the Order of Friendship. He is a three-time recipient of the Government of the Russian Federation Prize in Science and Technology, receiving the Laureate of the Presidential Prize, the Laureate of the Government Prize, and the Laureate of the Government Prize in Education.

Chapygn is a senior member of the Institute of Electrical and Electronics Engineers. He became an academician of the Russian Academy of Sciences in the department of nanotechnology and information technology in 2016.
