= Day of Remembrance and Sorrow =

Russian, Belarusian and Ukrainian celebration

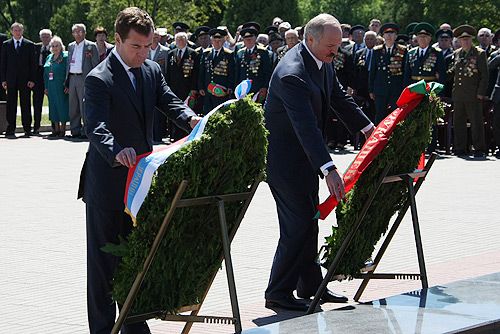
Dmitry Medvedev at a wreath-laying ceremony at the Eternal Flame at the Brest Hero-Fortress Memorial Complex with President of Belarus Alexander Lukashenko, 22 June 2008.

The Day of Remembrance and Sorrow (Russian: День памяти и скорби) is a memorable date celebrated annually on 22 June in Russia, Belarus and Ukraine. It honors the anniversary of Operation Barbarossa, the Axis invasion of the Soviet Union during World War II. On 13 June. the Presidium of the Supreme Soviet of Russia declared that 22 June should be marked as the Remembrance Day for Defenders of the Fatherland. It was established by decree of President of Russia Boris Yeltsin on 8 June 1996.

== Celebrations ==
=== In Russian Federation ===
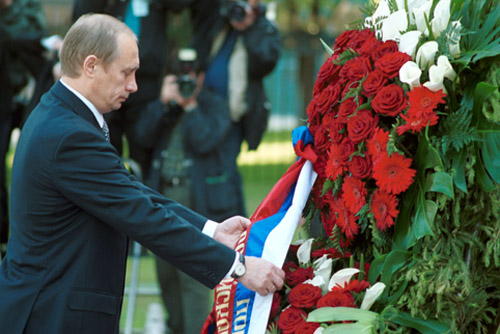
Vladimir Putin at the Tomb of the Unknown Soldier, 22 June 2000.

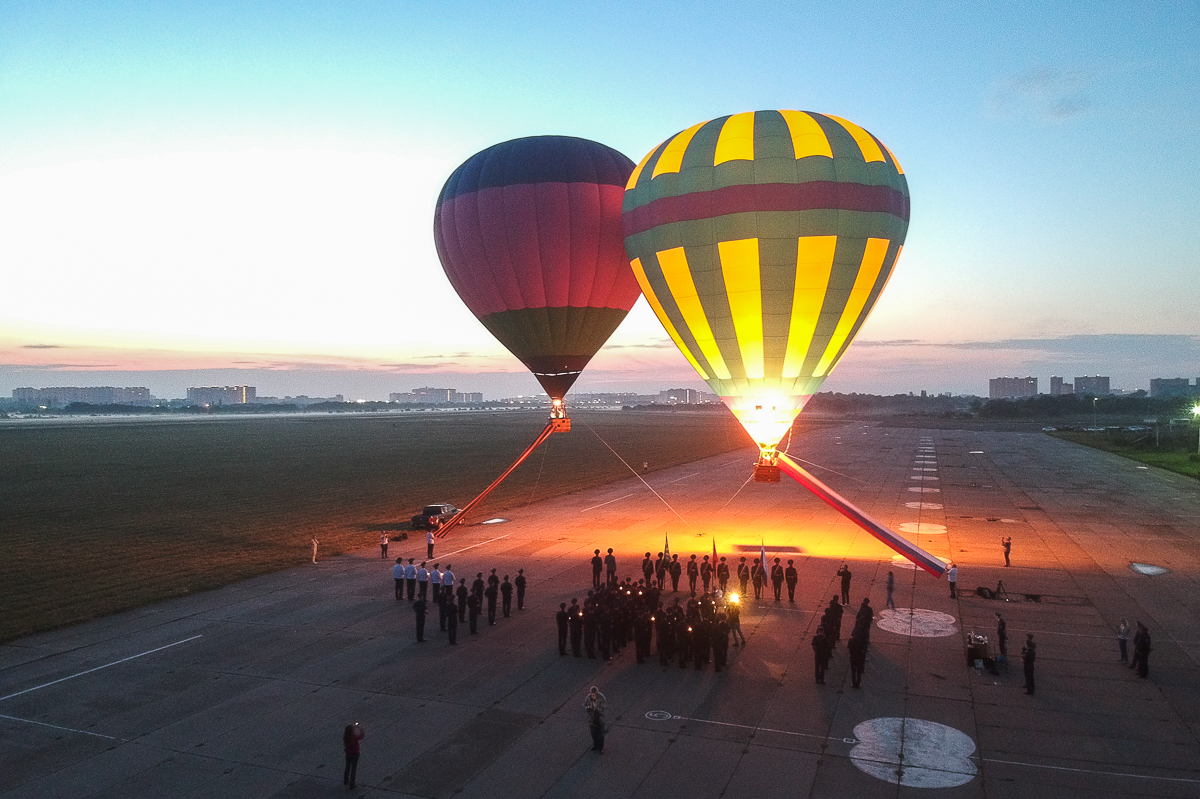
The Memory Watch campaign

On this day, national flags are lowered on the buildings of state institutions, ships of the Russian Navy. Flags with mourning ribbons are instead hung on residential buildings. All entertainment events and broadcasts on television and radio are canceled throughout the day. Commemorative events are held throughout the country, such as the laying flowers and wreaths at monuments honoring the Great Patriotic War. The President of Russia, the Prime Minister, the Chairman of the Federation Council, the Chairman of the State Duma, members of the Federal Assembly, and representatives of veteran organizations lay wreaths at the Tomb of the Unknown Soldier in the Alexander Garden.

The Candle of Remembrance campaign is another commonplace event (held annually since 2009). In 2015, former Soviet nations such as Kazakhstan, Armenia and Belarus had participated in the campaign. The annual open-air concert "Music of Peace Against War" is traditionally held in Krasnoyarsk. The Memory Watch campaign is another civilian event. The President Vladimir Putin took part in the opening ceremony of the campaign in 2019 national event at the Victory Museum on Moscow's Poklonnaya Gora. Since 2017, a demilitarized convoy of armored vehicles from the Moscow Garrison have driven from Moscow to the Belarusian capital of Minsk and returns to the Russian capital.

In 2020, Putin visited the newly opened Main Cathedral of the Russian Armed Forces on 22 June. The 2020 celebrations of the holiday were part of the two day reception for veterans that would conclude in 24 June with the Moscow Victory Day Parade.

=== In Belarus ===
22 June is celebrated in Belarus as the Day of the Nationwide Memory of the Victims of the Great Patriotic War and in Ukraine as the Day of mourning and Commemoration of the Memory of the Victims of the War. On the war's 80th anniversary, a commemorative ceremony at the Brest Fortress was held with the participation of the Belarusian military and the Ryazan Guards Higher Airborne Command School.

=== In Ukraine ===
The day is established in Ukraine "... for the purpose of nationwide commemoration of the sons and daughters of the Ukrainian people who fell during the Great Patriotic War of 1941-1945, their feat and sacrifice ... in support of the initiative of public organizations of veterans of war, labor, the Armed Forces and victims of Nazi persecution..." according to the Decree of the President of Ukraine "On the Day of Mourning and Commemoration of the Victims of the War in Ukraine" of November 17, 2000 No. 1245/2000.

== See also ==
- Time of Remembrance and Reconciliation for Those Who Lost Their Lives during the Second World War
- Anti-Fascist Struggle Day
- Day of Remembrance of the Victims of Political Repressions
- Victory Day (9 May)
