= Dario Salas Sommer =

Chilean philosopher, scientist and humanist (1935–2018)

- Born: 4 March 1935; Santiago, Chile
- Died: 3 February 2018 (aged 82); Santiago, Chile
- Occupations: Philosopher, scientist, humanist

Darío Salas Sommer (Spanish: Darío Salas Sommer; 4 March 1935 in Santiago, Chile – 3 February 2018) was a Chilean philosopher, scientist and humanist. He is known especially for his exploration of moral aspects of human life and personal development, described in his notable books ‘Morals of the XXI Century’ and ‘Cosmic Currency, the Greatest Wealth’

== Biography ==
Sommer was born in Santiago, on March 4, 1935. He is the grandson of the distinguished Chilean educator Darío Salas Díaz. In 1970, he founded the Institute for Hermetic Philosophy headquartered in Santiago, Chile, and represented in Argentina, Spain, the United States and Russia. Sommer gave more than 3,000 lectures and was interviewed on TV and in magazines around the world.

== Philosophy ==
Sommer has been committed to the progress of humanity and to the internal development of the human being for more than four decades. He has discovered a scientifically-based morality called "moral physics," which is based on a series of maxims, in which the underlying assumption is that morals are laws of nature.

The existence of objective morality has been debated since the times of Aristotle and Plato. Sommer puts forth the concept that ‘moral laws’ exist for both individuals and nations. Who follows the moral rules will prosper and who violates them will be punished. In his book ‘Moral of the 21st Century’ he proves that acting in accordance with the principles of morality is not only fair, but also beneficial. This book, originally written in Spanish, has already been translated into English, Arabic, German, Russian and Chinese.

‘Personally, I have had the privilege to scientifically prove how certain moral aberrations immediately create a decline in vital energy, which I explain and support in my book’, stated Dario Salas Sommer. This ideas reflecting ‘moral universalism’ can be found among other contemporary philosophers, among them Noam Chomsky and Jurgen Habermas. Dario Salas Sommer, however, gives a deeper view on human morality in connection with person, nature and consciousness. In his books the practical methods of personal development are given, which is why Sommer's approach has been called by the author ‘operative philosophy’, or ‘practical philosophy’. Through daily actions, one can harmoniously unify spirituality, love, money, happiness and wisdom as a result.

== The public sphere ==
Sommer is the founder of Fundacion Bolivariana Latinoamericana, a non-profit foundation created to support and develop educational and cultural projects for youth. The foundation supports scientific and academic cooperation between universities of Latin America and Eurasia, in ecology, social science and human development.

Sommer continuously participates, online and in person, in global cultural and scientific events. In 2007, he gave a speech at the Global Warming and Climate Change Summit (Calentamiento Global y Cambio Climático: La Hora de Actuar ha Llegado) in Santiago, Chile, dedicated to the environmental crisis affecting our planet and attended by the President of Chile Michelle Bachelet. During this notable event, he met with US Vice President Al Gore. “All of our problems, including Global Warming, have their origin in this fragmented vision of reality that makes us feel as if we owned Nature, instead of being a part of it”, the researcher points, “The truth is, an event as important as global warming cannot take place without making any connection to the emotions, actions and thoughts of the human species.”

In Summer 2015, Sommer drew public attention to the importance of moral values in world politics. During the summit of the BRICS countries in Ufa, Russia, he addressed the leaders of the world fastest-growing nations, strongly urging them to remember the fundamental importance of moral principles in global politics and finance. Dario Salas Sommer has a strong.recognition in Russia where he is a well-known figure (he is awarded with the Member of the Order of Friendship) The book 'Morals for 21st Century', focused on ethics and morality, is studied by the students in the universities of BRICS countries. Dario Salas Sommer has a strong recognition across the world, and his works received positive comments from state leaders of China and India.

During the international conference on climate change in Paris (COP21, December 2015) the Secretary-General of the United Nations Ban Ki-Moon noted the importance of the philosopher's ideas regarding the world leaders' moral responsibility. In September 2016, the book 'Morals for the 21st Century' has been introduced at the United Nations General Assembly and received by world leaders as a symbol of reviving moral values in global affairs.

== Honors and awards ==
- Member of the Order of Friendship (Russian Federation)

== Major works ==
- 2012 Cosmiс Currency, the Greatest Wealth / Moneda Cosmica, la suprema riqueza
- 2010 ¿Cuánto Vale una persona?
- 1998 Morals for the 21st Century / Moral para el Siglo XXI
- 1984 Desarrollo del Mundo Interno
- 1983 Does Woman Exist? / ¿Existe la Mujer?
- 1982 The Science of Love / La Ciencia del Amor (Dario Salas Sommer used the pseudonym of John Baines for the English translation of the book.)
- 1979 The Stellar Man / El Hombre Estelar
- 1967 Hypsoconsciousness: Techniques for Achieving Personal Success Técnicas de Hipsoconciencia para el Éxito personal
