= Order of Friendship =

State award of the Russian Federation

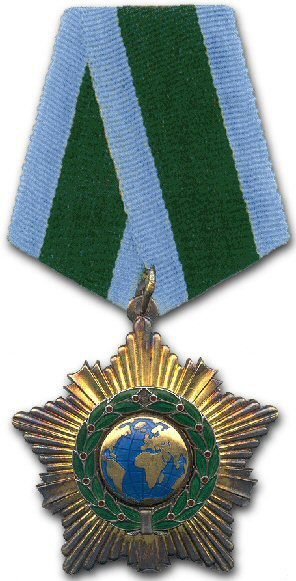
- Order of Friendship (obverse)
- Type: Single grade order
- Awarded for: Strengthening friendship and cooperation between peoples
- Presented by: Russian Federation
- Eligibility: Russian nationals and foreign nationals
- Status: Active
- Established: 2 March 1994
- Ribbon of the Order of Friendship

Precedence
- Next (higher): Order of Honour
- Next (lower): Order of Parental Glory
- Related: Order of Friendship of Peoples

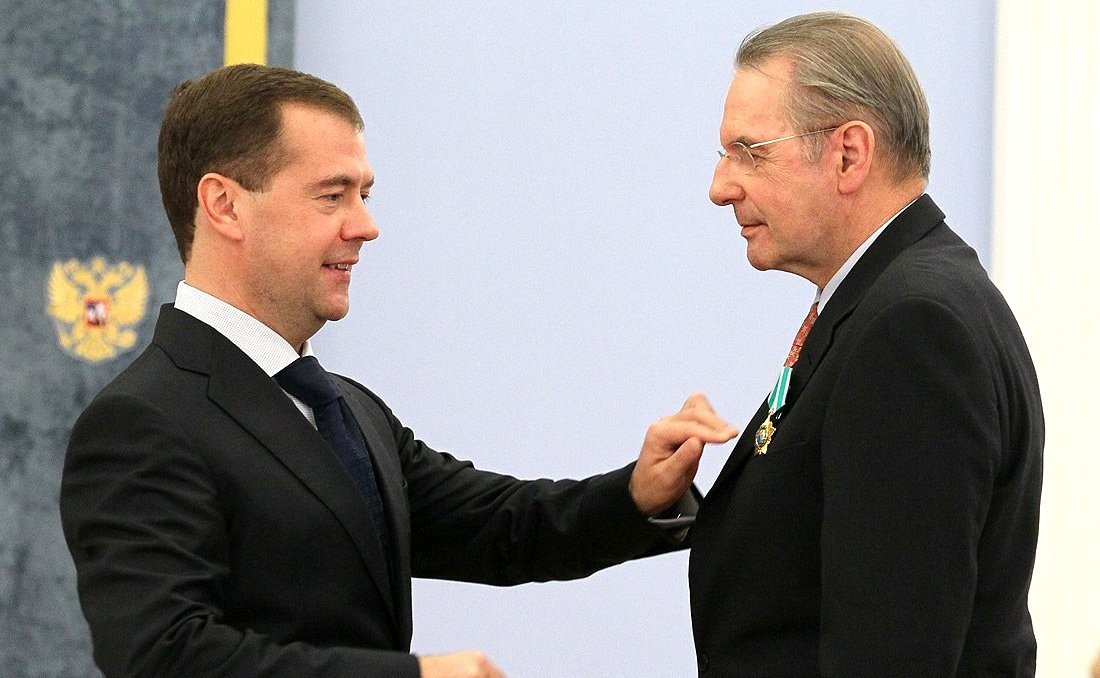
International Olympic Committee president Jacques Rogge being awarded the Order of Friendship by Russian president Dmitry Medvedev on November 22, 2011 at the Moscow Kremlin.

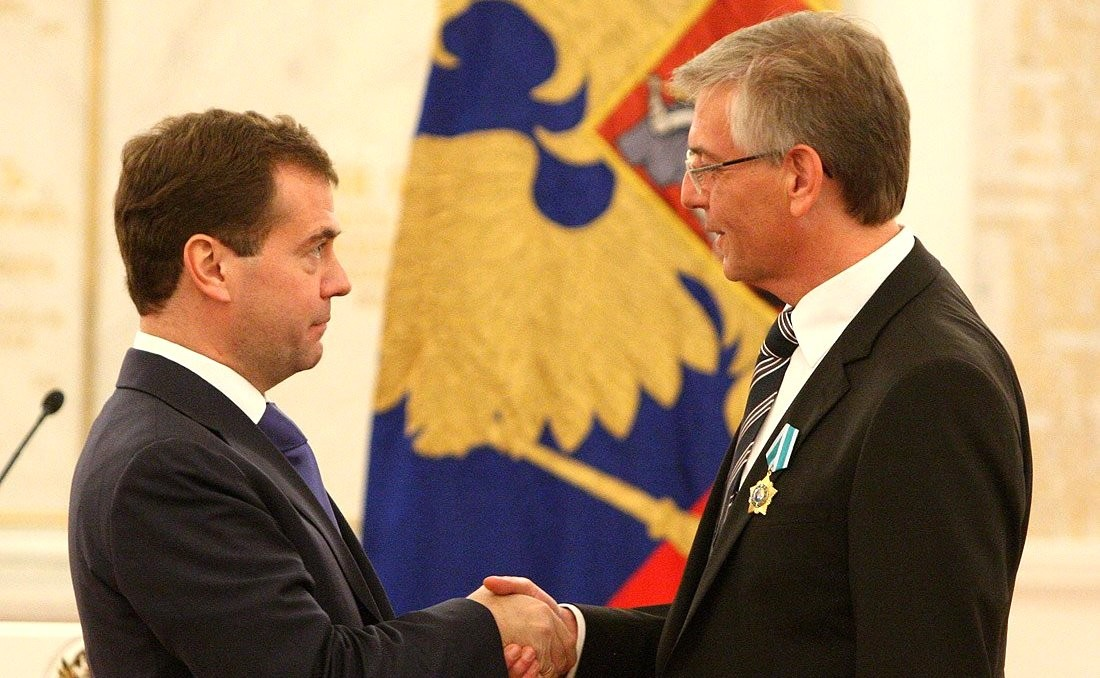
Manfred Schmidt, Head of the Department for Crisis Management of the German Interior Ministry, being decorated with the Order of Friendship by Russian President Dmitry Medvedev on October 13, 2010 at the Moscow Kremlin.

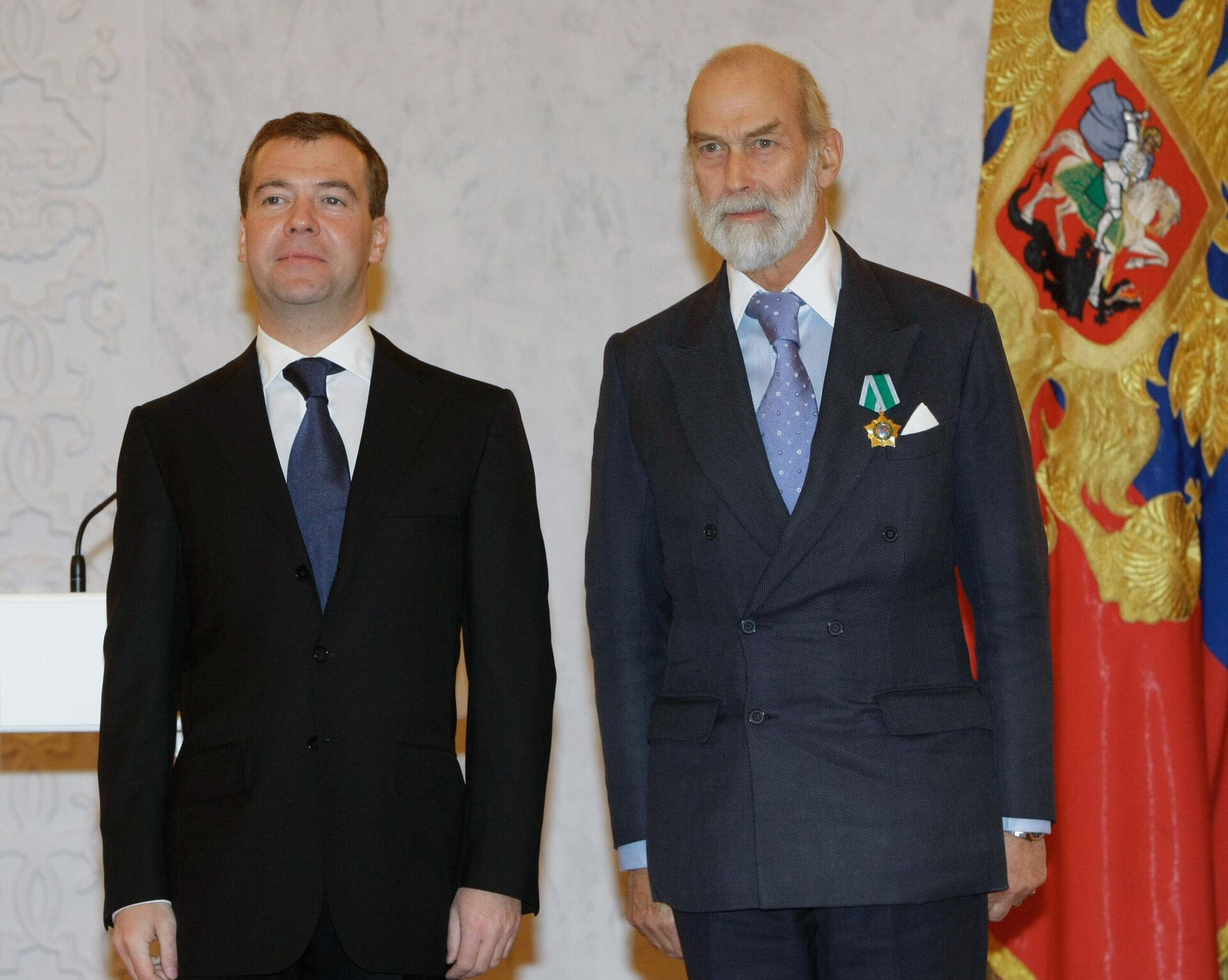
Prince Michael of Kent receives the Order of Friendship from Russian president Dmitry Medvedev on November 4, 2009, at the Moscow Kremlin. He later returned the honour in the aftermath of the 2022 Russian invasion of Ukraine.

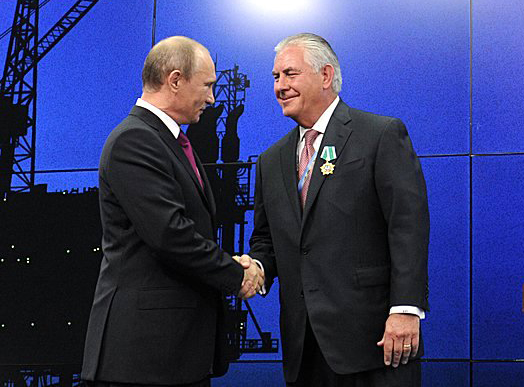
CEO of ExxonMobil Rex Tillerson receiving the Order of Friendship from Russian president Vladimir Putin on June 21, 2013 during the St. Petersburg International Economic Forum.

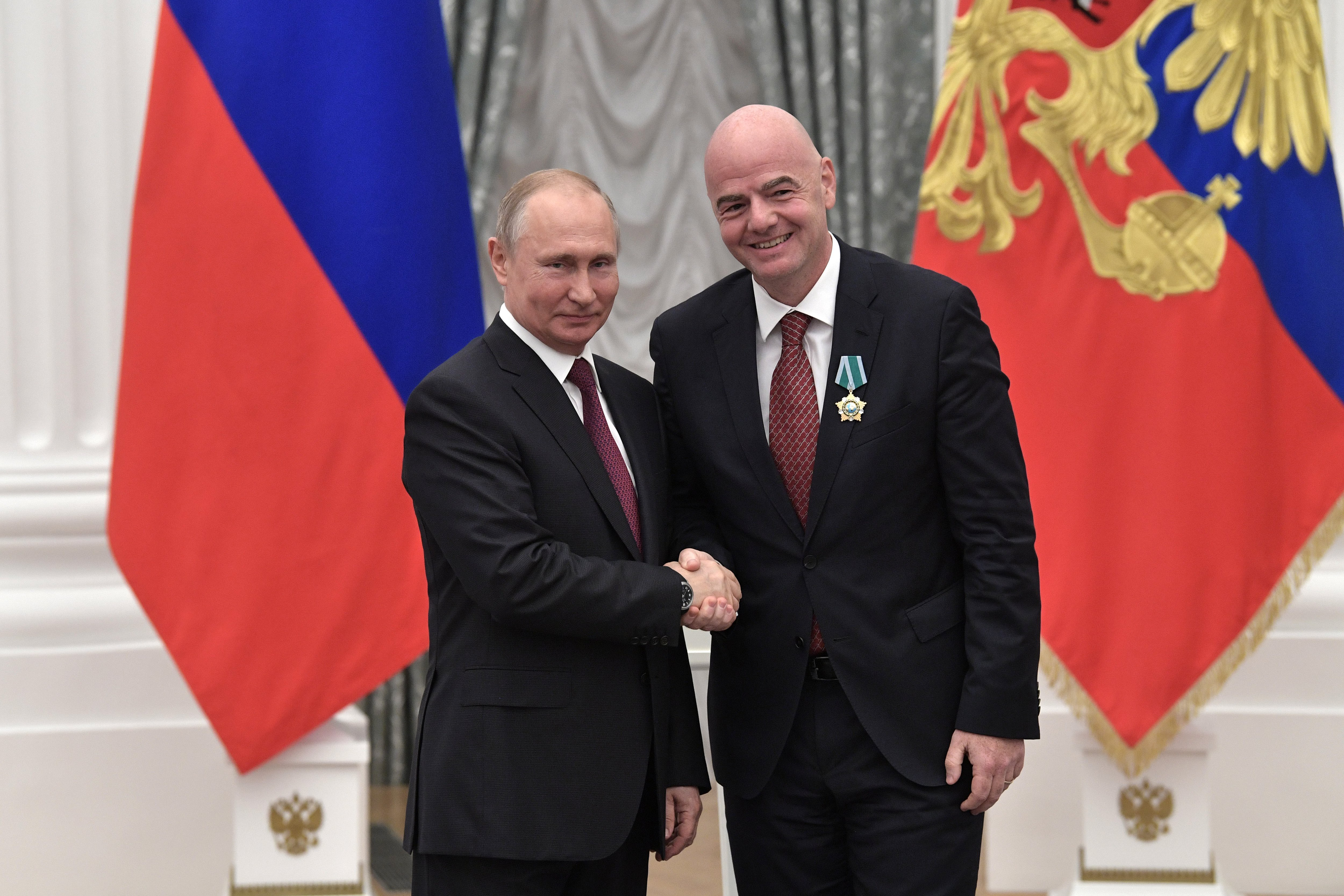
FIFA president Gianni Infantino after receiving the Order of Friendship from Russian President Vladimir Putin on May 23, 2019 at the Moscow Kremlin.

The Order of Friendship (Russian: Орден Дружбы, romanized: Orden Druzhby) is a state decoration of the Russian Federation established by Boris Yeltsin by presidential decree 442 of 2 March 1994 to reward Russian and foreign nationals whose work, deeds and efforts have been aimed at the betterment of relations with the Russian Federation and its people. The design of order was created by Alexander Zhuk. Its statute was later amended by presidential decree 19 of 6 January 1999, presidential decree 1999 of 7 September 2010, presidential decree 1631 of 16 December 2011, and presidential decree 308 of 16 March 2012. The Order of Friendship is the direct successor of the Soviet Order of Friendship of Peoples and like the latter, its insignia was similarly designed by Alexander Zhuk.

== Award statute ==
The Order of Friendship is awarded to Russian and foreign nationals for special merit in strengthening peace, friendship, cooperation and understanding between nations, for fruitful work on the convergence and mutual enrichment of cultures of nations and peoples; for the active conservation, development and promotion of the cultural and historical heritage of Russia; for great contribution to the implementation of joint ventures with the Russian Federation, major economic projects and attracting investments into the economy of the Russian Federation; for broad charitable activities.

== Award description ==
The badge of the Order of Friendship is made of gilded silver and enamels. It is a pentagonal star created from diverging golden rays. On the obverse at the center of the star is a terrestrial globe, with the oceans covered in blue enamel. The globe is surrounded by a green enamelled wreath of olive branches. On the reverse is the inscription "Peace and Friendship" (Russian: "Мир и дружба") and the etched serial number of the individual award. The distance between opposite tips of the star is 44 mm.

The badge of the order is connected by a ring through the suspension loop to a standard Russian pentagonal mount covered with an overlapping 24 mm wide green silk moiré ribbon with 6 mm wide light blue stripes along its edges. When worn in the presence of other Orders and medals of the Russian Federation, the Order of Friendship is located immediately after the Order of Honour.

== Notable recipients (partial list) ==
The following individuals were awarded the Order of Friendship:

- Pedro Duque, First Spanish Astronaut. Awarded for the Cervantes mission in 1998, which was launched from Russia.
- Prince Aimone, Duke of Aosta
- His Holiness Baselios Marthoma Mathews III -The Malankara Metropolitan and the Catholicos of the Malankara Church, India
- Saleumxay Kommasith, Minister of Foreign Affairs of Laos
- Mahathir Mohamad, Malaysian 4th and 7th Prime Minister
- Adelina Sotnikova, a Russian competitive figure skater
- Evgenia Medvedeva, a Russian competitive figure skater
- Kamila Valieva, a Russian competitive figure skater
- Adolf Shayevich, Russian-Jewish rabbi
- Sopubek Begaliev, Kyrgyz politician (Kyrgyzstan)
- Lydia T. Black, a historian and anthropologist in the field of Russian America (US)
- George Blake, double agent (UK)
- David Blatt, basketball coach (Israel/US)
- William Craft Brumfield, historian, preservationist and photographer (US)
- Yury Chaplygin, president of the National Research University of Electronic Technology
- Jean Chrétien, PC, OM, CC, KC, former prime minister of Canada
- Dimitris Christofias, President of Cyprus
- Ahmad Afandi Abdulaev, Mufti of Dagestan
- Van Cliburn, renowned pianist (US)
- Bernie Ecclestone, British business magnate
- Andrey Elinson, former Deputy CEO Basic Element
- Patricia Cloherty, entrepreneur and businesswoman (US)
- Frank De Winne, ESA astronaut and head of the European Astronaut Centre (Belgium)
- Milorad Dodik, President of the Republika Srpska
- Maurice Druon, writer (France)
- Inder Kumar Gujral, former Prime Minister of India (2000)
- Yuli Gusman, film director (Azerbaijan)
- Nadey Hakim (2021)
- Eero Heinäluoma, Deputy Prime Minister of Finland, threw the award away after the 2022 Russian invasion of Ukraine
- Ignatius IV of Antioch (Hazim), patriarch of the Greek Orthodox Christian Church
- Prince Dimitri Romanov, claimant to headship of the Imperial House of Russia
- Victor Hochhauser, British music promoter
- Gleb Ivashentsov (2003)
- Hun Sen, Prime Minister of Cambodia
- Gianni Infantino, president of FIFA.
- Daisaku Ikeda, president of Soka Gakkai International (Japan)
- V. R. Krishna Iyer, jurist (India)
- Jayakanthan, Tamil writer (India), 2011
- Murli Manohar Joshi, Indian physicist and politician
- Akhmad Kadyrov, President of Chechnya
- Moshe Kantor, president of the European Jewish Congress
- Anatoly Karpov, chess player, for his great contribution to strengthening peace and friendship between peoples and productive social activities
- Timo Vihavainen, professor at the University of Helsinki (Finland)
- Roman Abramovich, former owner of Chelsea F.C
- Prince Michael of Kent, cousin of Queen Elizabeth II and descendant of Tsar Alexander II of Russia; a qualified interpreter of Russian (UK). He returned the honour in the aftermath of the 2022 Russian invasion of Ukraine.
- Vakhtang Kikabidze, singer and actor (the award was rejected by Kikabidze in August 2008) (Georgia)
- Emir Kusturica, Serbian filmmaker, actor and musician
- André Kuipers, ESA astronaut (Netherlands)
- Christine Lagarde, President of the European Central Bank and former Managing Director of the IMF (France)
- Lee Kuan Yew, Minister Mentor of Singapore
- Valery Leontiev, pop singer
- Yulia Lipnitskaya, figure skater, received award for outstanding performance at the 2014 Sochi Winter Olympics
- Antonio Mennini, Apostolic Nuncio to Russia (2002–2010) for his contribution to the development of Russian-Vatican relations (Vatican)
- Ralph Munro (1998)
- Aliya Mustafina, Olympic gold medalist in gymnastics
- Riccardo Muti, conductor (Italy)
- Oscar Niemeyer, renowned architect (Brazil)
- God Nisanov, billionaire property developer
- Sagadat Nurmagambetov, Defense Minister of Kazakhstan
- Constantine Orbelian, conductor and pianist, 2012 Medal Recipient
- Richard Pierce, a historian of Russian-American studies (US)
- A. Sivathanu Pillai, BrahMos chief (India)
- Marcel Prud'homme, Senator (Canada)
- Grigory Rodchenkov, director of Russia's national antidoping laboratory who later defected and exposed Russian doping system (awarded prior to the scandal)
- Jacques Rogge, 8th President of the International Olympic Committee (Belgium)
- Buvaisar Saitiev, three-time Olympic gold medal wrestler
- Vladimir Sangi, Nivkh author, publicist, and language activist
- Ekaterina Semenikhin, honorary consul of Russia in Monaco
- Mrinal Sen, film director (India)
- Dimitris Sioufas, legislator (Greece)
- Dario Salas Sommer, Chilean philosopher
- James W. Symington, a former member of the U.S. House of Representatives and current attorney at Nossaman LLP/O'Connor & Hannan (US)
- Tô Lâm, currently General Secretary of the Communist Party of Vietnam and President of Vietnam, awarded during his term as Minister of Public Security for "the development of bilateral cooperation" between Russia and Vietnam
- Rex Tillerson, U.S. Secretary of State under President Donald Trump, and former CEO of ExxonMobil
- Mari Törőcsik, Hungarian actress
- Andrzej Wajda, film director (Poland)
- Rowan Williams, Archbishop of Canterbury, recognised for contributions to friendly relations between Russia and the UK, and his love of Russian literature (UK)
- Tatjana Ždanoka, politician (Latvia)
- Ban Ki-moon, eighth secretary-general of the United Nations
- Xavier Rolet KBE, CEO London Stock Exchange Group
- Valentina Tereshkova, the first woman in space
- Alina Zagitova, a Russia competitive figure skater
- Kassym-Jomart Tokayev, President of Kazakhstan
- Mehriban Aliyeva, First Vice-President of Azerbaijan
- Megawati Sukarnoputri, 5th President of Indonesia
- Alexander (Ishein), Archbishop of Baku and Azerbaijan from 1999 to 2021
- Péter Szijjártó Hungarian politician, Minister of Foreign Affairs and Trade, awarded in December 2021
- Boris Dobrodeev, screenwriter
- Maria Zakharova, Director of the Information and Press Department of the Ministry of Foreign Affairs of the Russian Federation
- Vija Artmane, actor
- Patriarch Theodore II of Alexandria, Patriarch of the Greek Orthodox Patriarchate of Alexandria for his great contribution to the development of cooperation between the Russian Federation and the Arab Republic of Egypt, awarded in September 2009
- Steven Seagal received for his "major contribution to the development of international cultural and humanitarian cooperation".
- Avtandil Varsimashvili, Georgian theatre and film director
- Yoko Nagae Ceschina, Japanese philanthropist and patron of the arts
- Alexei Osipov - Theologian and professor
- Daniel Ortega - President / leader of Nicaragua

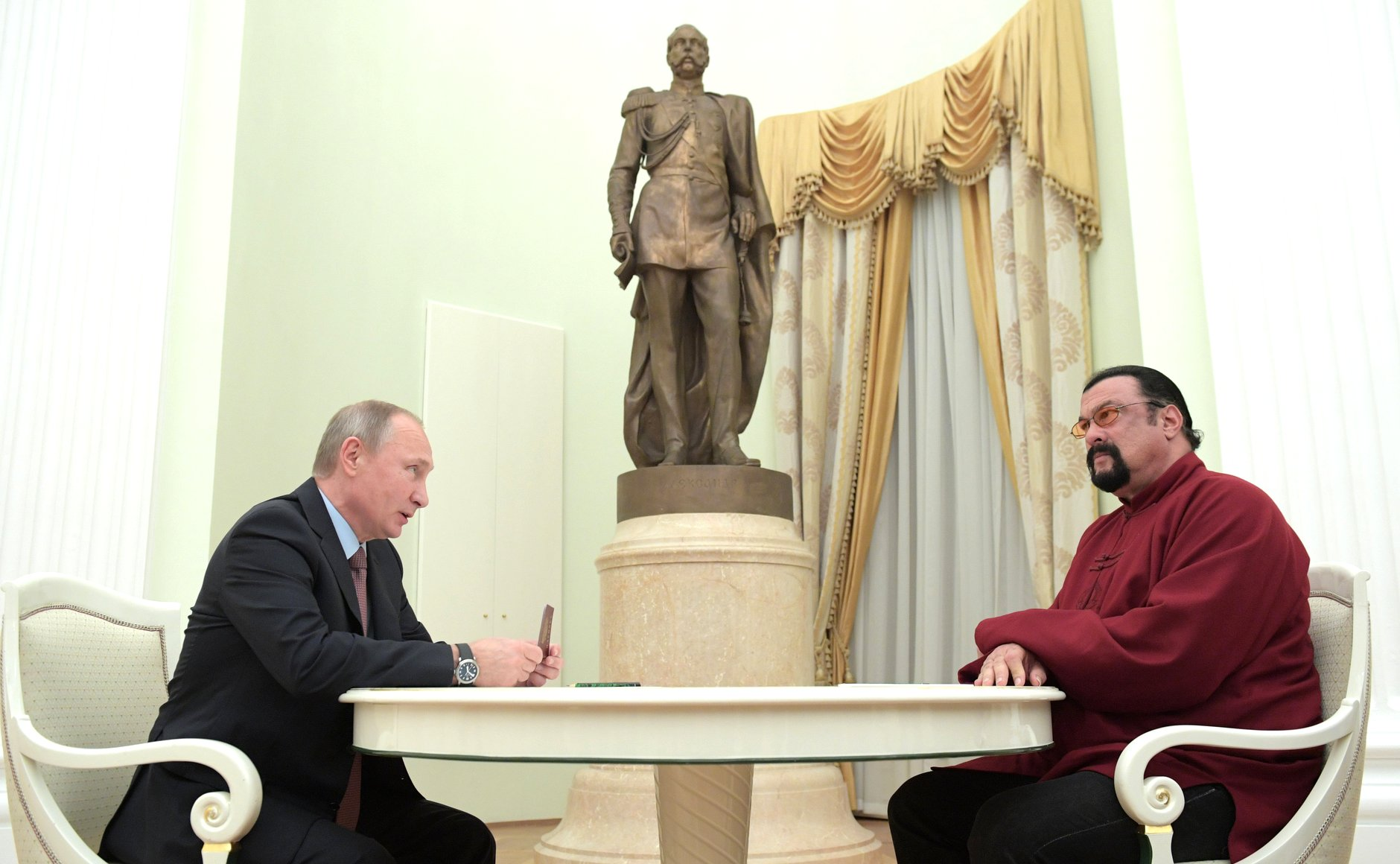
President Vladimir Putin presented US actor Steven Seagal with his new Russian passport and congratulated him on receiving Russian citizenship.

== See also ==
- Order of Friendship of Peoples (Soviet Union)
- Awards and decorations of the Russian Federation
