= Main Cathedral of the Russian Armed Forces =

Russian Orthodox cathedral church in Moscow, Russia

- Главный храм Вооружённых сил России
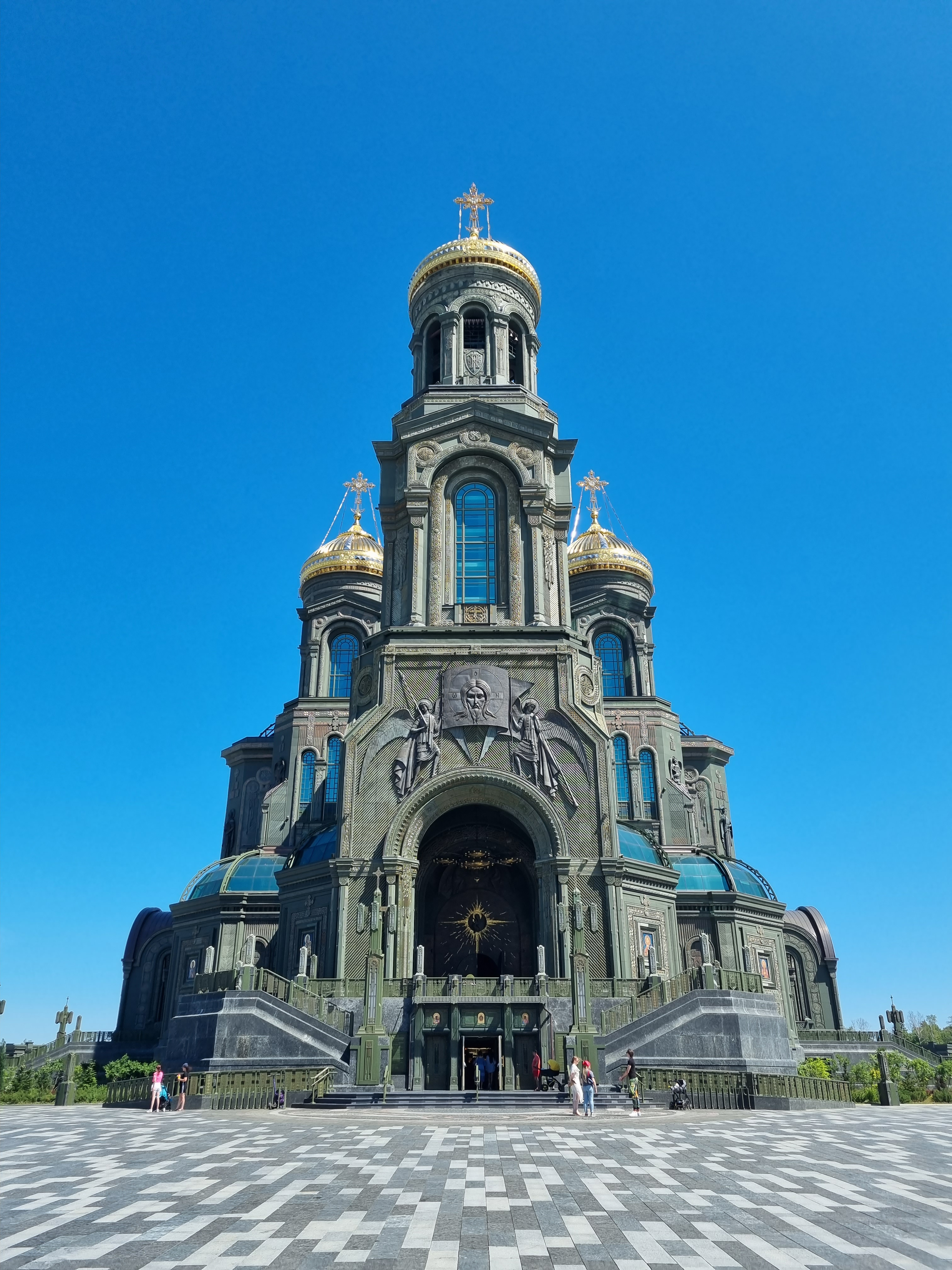

- Location within the Moscow Oblast
- 55°34′45″N 36°49′19″E
- Location: Patriot Park, Kubinka, Odintsovsky District, Moscow Oblast, Russia
- Denomination: Russian Orthodox Church
- Website: hram.mil.ru

History
- Founded: September 2018 – May 2020
- Consecrated: 14 June 2020; 6 years ago

Architecture
- Style: Russian Revival

Specifications
- Length: 79 m (length-width)
- Height: 95 m (312 ft)

The Main Cathedral of the Russian Armed Forces, (Note: Russian: Главный храм Вооружённых сил России, romanized: Glavny khram Vooruzhyonnykh sil Rossii) also known as the Cathedral of the Resurrection of Christ, (Note: Russian: Храм Воскресения Христова, romanized: Khram Voskreseniya Khristova) is a Russian Orthodox Patriarchal cathedral in honour of the Resurrection of Christ and "dedicated to the 75th anniversary of victory in the Great Patriotic War, as well as the military feats of the Russian people in all wars", built in the Patriot Park in the Odintsovsky District, Moscow Oblast.

The cathedral was built with donations and budget funds from the Moscow city government and the Moscow Oblast. It was consecrated as part of the celebration of the 75th anniversary of Soviet victory on the Eastern Front of World War II, known as the Great Patriotic War in Russia. An exhibition dedicated to the history of the Russian state and its armed forces will be located on-site.

The construction of the cathedral was completed on 9 May 2020, on the annual Victory Day. It was consecrated on 14 June. It was opened on 22 June 2020, on the Day of Remembrance and Sorrow, the day Nazi Germany invaded the Soviet Union in 1941, by the head of the Russian Orthodox Synod’s new Armed Forces Liaison Department, Father Oleg Ovcharov.

== Design ==
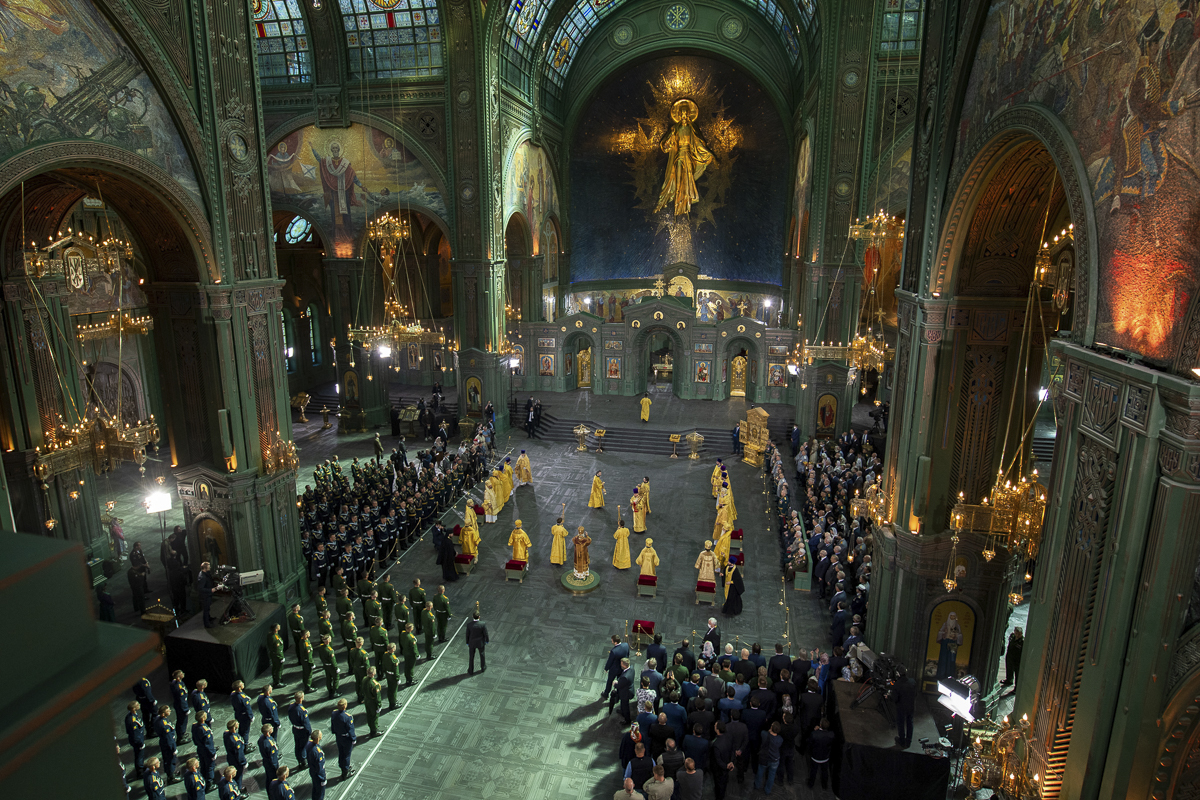
A ceremony in the main temple

According to the official website, "the church was designed in a monumental Russian style, organically incorporating modern architectural approaches and innovations unique to the Orthodox church creation". The façades of the building are finished with metal, the arches are glazed.

The walls of the church, decorated with murals, include battle scenes from Russian military history and Bible scripture texts. The decoration of the lower (small) church is made of ceramics and is decorated with Gzhel painting, with pieces of glass smalt used in the manufacture of the mosaic panels. The central apse dedicated to the Resurrection of Christ is metal relief.

The decor of the church, the icon, the iconostasis (icon wall), and the marching military icons are made of copper with enamels. The image of the Saviour-Not-Made-by-Hands in the central dome of the church is the largest image of Christ's face executed in mosaic.

=== Glass mosaics ===
Stained glass mosaics in the cathedral's vault feature various Red Army orders, accompanied by their respected ribbons that denote their class. Many of these orders display the faces of prominent military leaders from the Imperial Russian Army, who made a significant contribution to the Russian history. The Soviet Union's renewed wave of nationalism during the Great Patriotic War prompted the inclusion of the most revered Orthodox Christian saints who had served in the historical armies of Russia.

On September 5, 1943, a historic meeting in the Moscow Kremlin took place between Metropolitan Alexius and Soviet leader Joseph Stalin. After the meeting, the Communist Party of the Soviet Union permitted the Orthodox Church to legally function and operate after nearly two decades of severe oppression. Those churches that had not been destroyed by the Communist government began to reopen across the Soviet Union.

The following orders are depicted in the mosaics: The Order of Alexander Nevsky (First Class), Order of Bogdan Khmelnitsky (First Class), Order of Ushakov (First Class), Order of Nakhimov (First Class), Order of Suvorov (First Class), Order of Kutuzov (First Class), Order of Victory, Order of the Red Banner, Order of the Red Star, and the Order of the Patriotic War (First Class).

In April 2020, prior to the cathedral's opening, photos were released of mosaics that included depictions of some depicting then-President Vladimir Putin, Defence Minister Sergei Shoigu, FSB Director Alexander Bortnikov, Foreign Minister Sergei Lavrov, and the 2014 Russian annexation of Crimea. These were removed before the opening, reportedly at the request of Putin. A mosaic depicting Soviet leader Joseph Stalin was also criticised.

=== Sizes ===
Some of the sizes are symbolic. The height of the church along with the cross is 95 metres. The diameter of the drum of the main dome is 19.45 metres, symbolising the year when the Great Patriotic War ended – 1945. The height of the belfry is 75 metres, a reference to the 75 years that passed in 2020 since the end of World War II. The height of the small dome is 14.18 metres – open conflict between Nazi Germany and the USSR lasted 1,418 days and nights. The area of the church complex is 11,000 m^{2}. The capacity of the interior of the church is up to 6,000 people.

=== Bells ===
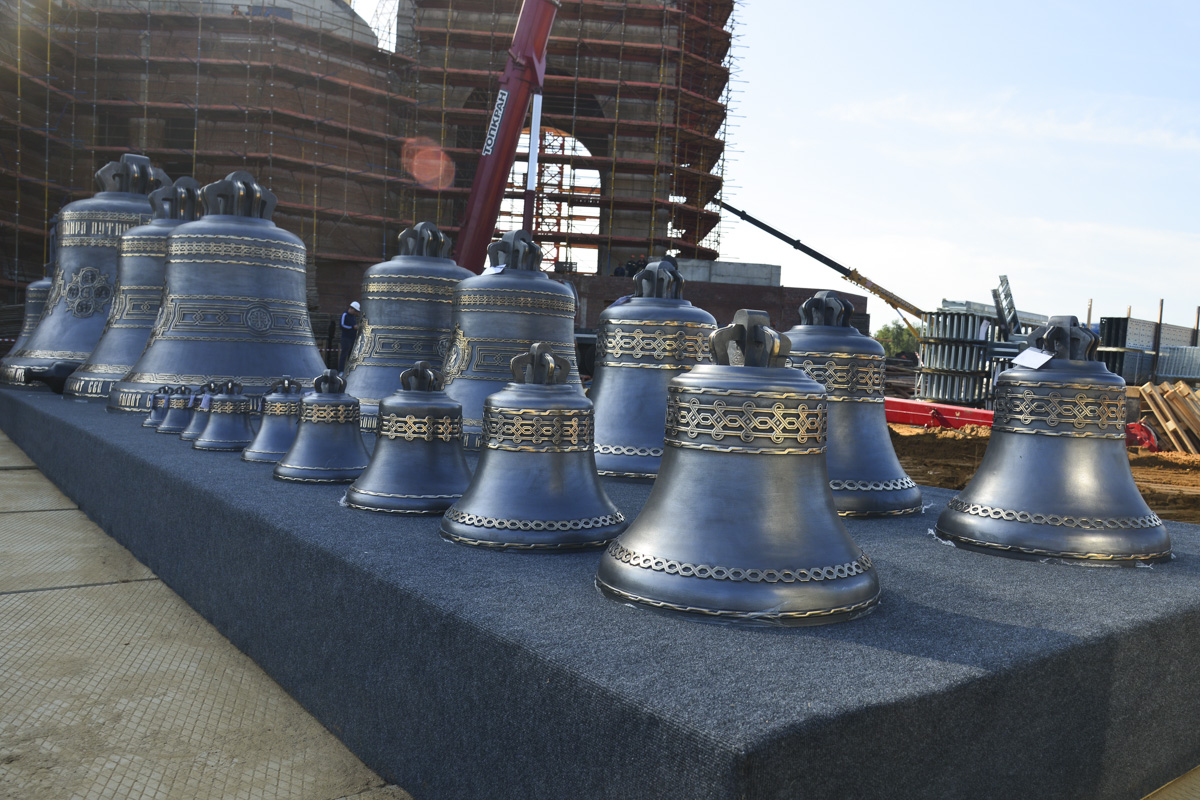
Bells installed in the cathedral

The bells were made at the Voronezh Foundry. The decoration of the bells repeats ornaments decorating the cathedral. The bells reflect the theme of Victory in the Great Patriotic War, icons of patrons of the Russian Army. The main bell-evangelist was decorated with bas-reliefs depicting key events of the Great Patriotic War. Work on the manufacture of the bells was carried out for six months. The ensemble weighs more than 20 tonnes, which includes 18 bells, the largest of which weighs 10 tonnes. 17 of the 18 bells are dedicated to the types and arms of the troops. On one side a military emblem is applied to the bell, on the other, the image of the patron saint. In August 2019, the bells were installed in the belfry of the cathedral.

=== Dome ===
In November 2019, an 80-tonne central dome was erected on the cathedral, the height and diameter of which are 12 metres. The cathedral has six domes, four of which are identical, each weighing 34 tonnes. The central one is the largest, and one is on the belfry. The design has a high alloy steel frame with a strength factor of 300 to 1,500 years.

=== Floor ===
The floors of the cathedral are metal. The metal is from melted-down Nazi trophies, such as weapons and tanks that were seized from Wehrmacht forces. The act of walking on the floors of the cathedral is intended to symbolise "delivering a blow to the fascist enemy”.

=== Main icon ===
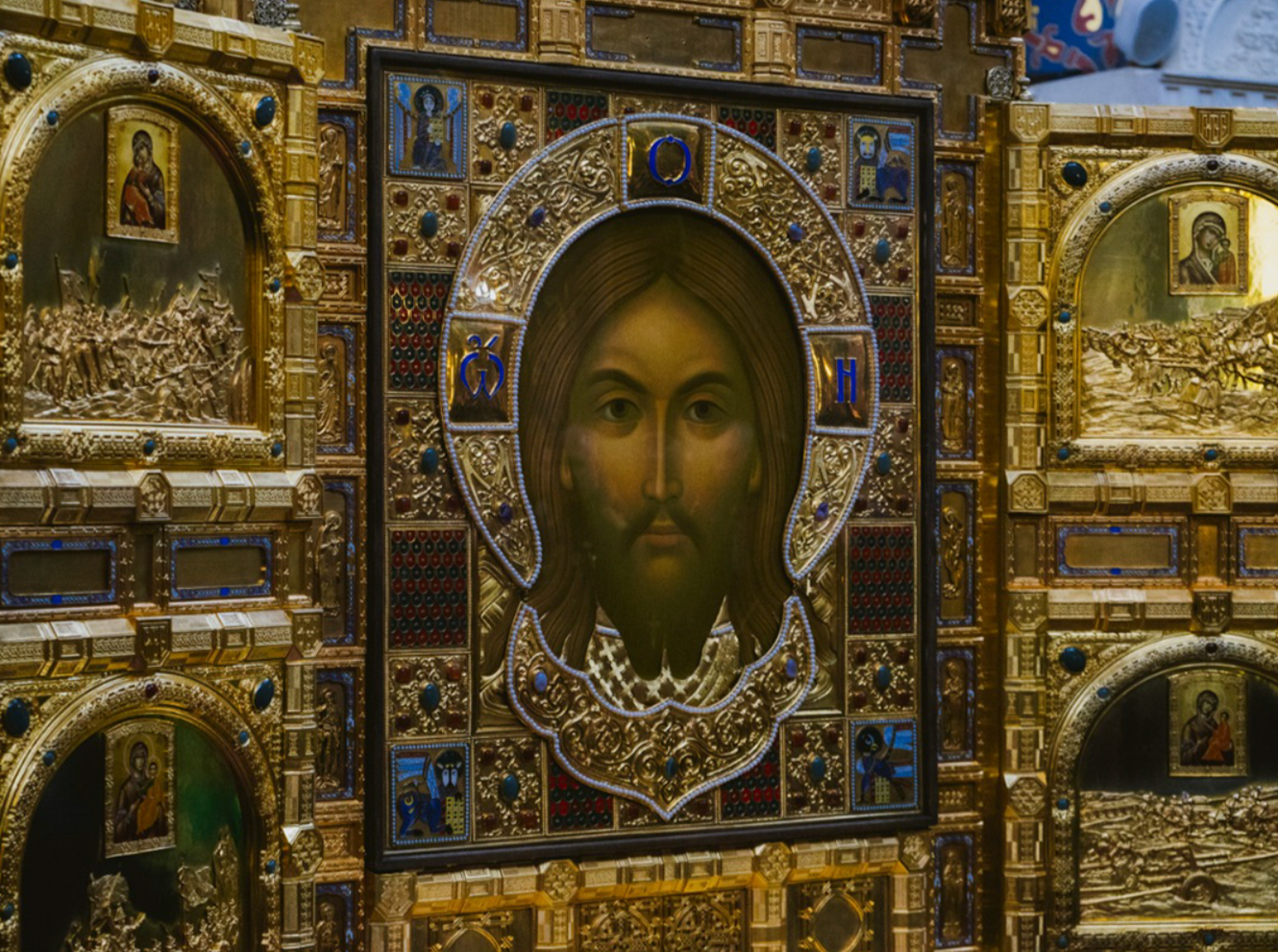
Icon of the Saviour Not Made by Hands

The central icon of the Main Church of the Russian Armed Forces is the "Holy Saviour" in the main dome. The Icon of the Saviour Not Made by Hands is a canonical image of the Holy Face of Jesus Christ, miraculously imprinted on a piece of material and transmitted by the Saviour himself to King Abgar V of Osroene. The central image is surrounded by smaller icons of the Most Holy Mother of God of Kazan, of Vladimir, of Smolensk and of Tikhvin, placed on artistic reliefs that depict significant events in the history of the Russian state.

In the ark, which always accompanies the icon, there are eight particles of other saints important to Russia and its military: the great martyr George the Victorious, St. Andrew the First-Called, St. Nicholas the Wonderworker, St. Sergius of Radonezh, the great martyr Barbara, the apostle Peter, the great martyr Panteleimon the Healer, and also Fyodor Ushakov, the righteous commander of the Black Sea Fleet and one of the most revered saints in the fleet.

The image of the Savior is placed in a bronze fold and weighs about 100 kg. The icon itself without a fold has dimensions of about 98 × 84 × 10 cm.

== Controversies ==
The museum, located next to the church, was rumored to contain Adolf Hitler's peaked cap and personal clothes, which were described as trophies and relics by Russian Deputy Minister of Defense.

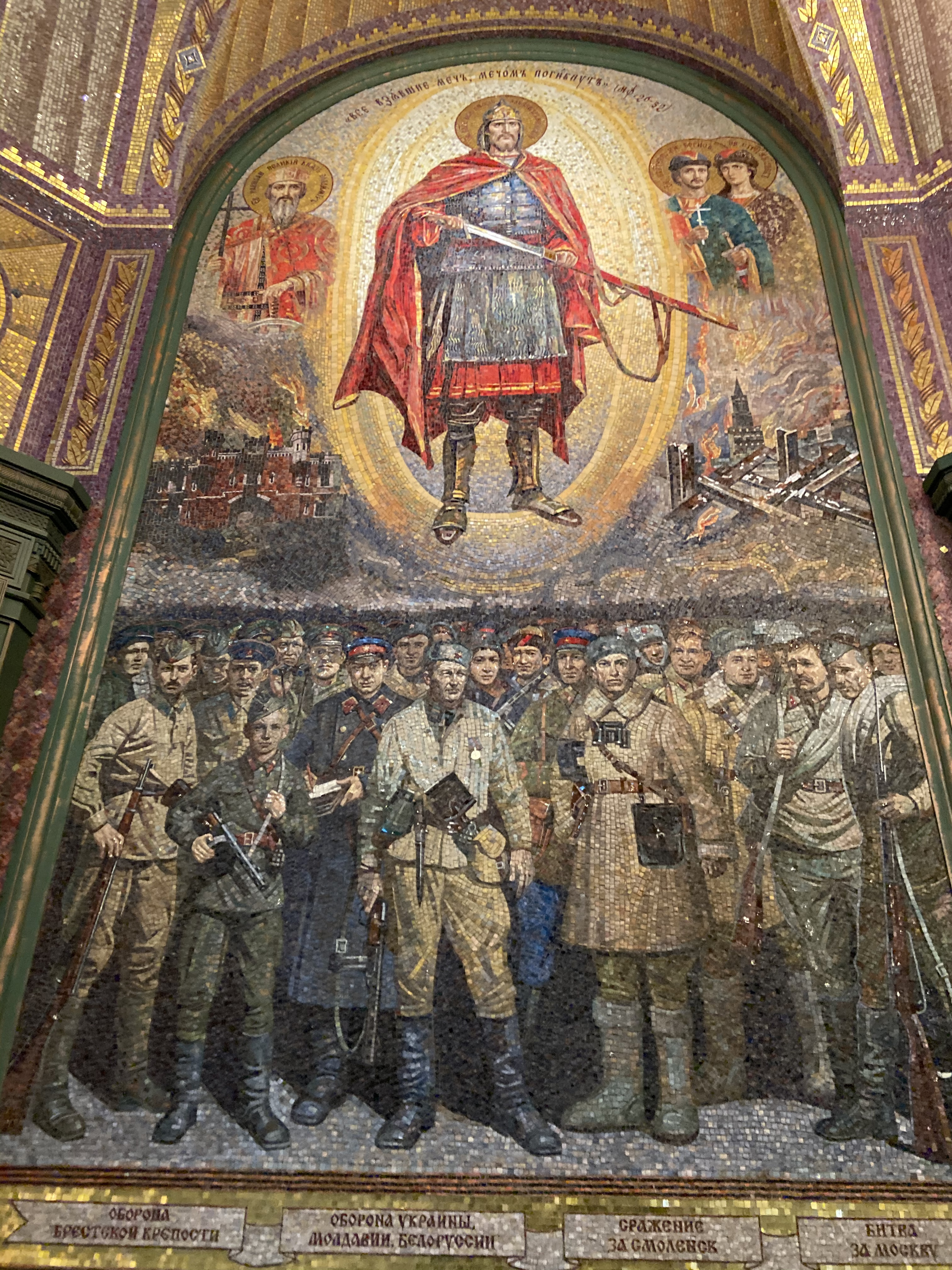
A mosaic in the Main Cathedral of the Russian Armed Forces commemorating the Soviet Armed Forces and some of its most important World War II battles

In April 2020, photos were leaked showing a partially completed mosaic of Russian President Vladimir Putin, Defence Minister Sergey Shoygu and other high-ranking Russian officials, as well as Soviet dictator Joseph Stalin. The Russian Orthodox Church initially explained the presence of mosaics featuring Putin and Stalin according to the tradition of depicting historical events – in this case, the 2014 annexation of Crimea to Russia and the 1945 Soviet victory in the Great Patriotic War (World War II). Later it was reported that the cathedral would not have any mosaics of either Putin or Stalin. The Russian Orthodox Church explained that this decision was made after taking into account the President's own opinion.

The church, and the imagery within it, have been linked to the 'Russkiy mir' or 'Russian world' theology which some Orthodox Christian Churches outside Russia have described as a heresy. This ideology has been described in the Financial Times as "Putin’s creation of an ideology that fuses respect for Russia’s Tsarist, Orthodox past with reverence for the Soviet defeat of fascism in the Second World War. This is epitomised in the Main Cathedral of the Russian Armed Forces, 40 miles west of Moscow, opened in 2020." During the Russian invasion of Ukraine, the church has come to be seen as a symbol of Russian militarism, with Russian operations in Ukraine being described as "holy" by Russian authorities.

== Gallery ==
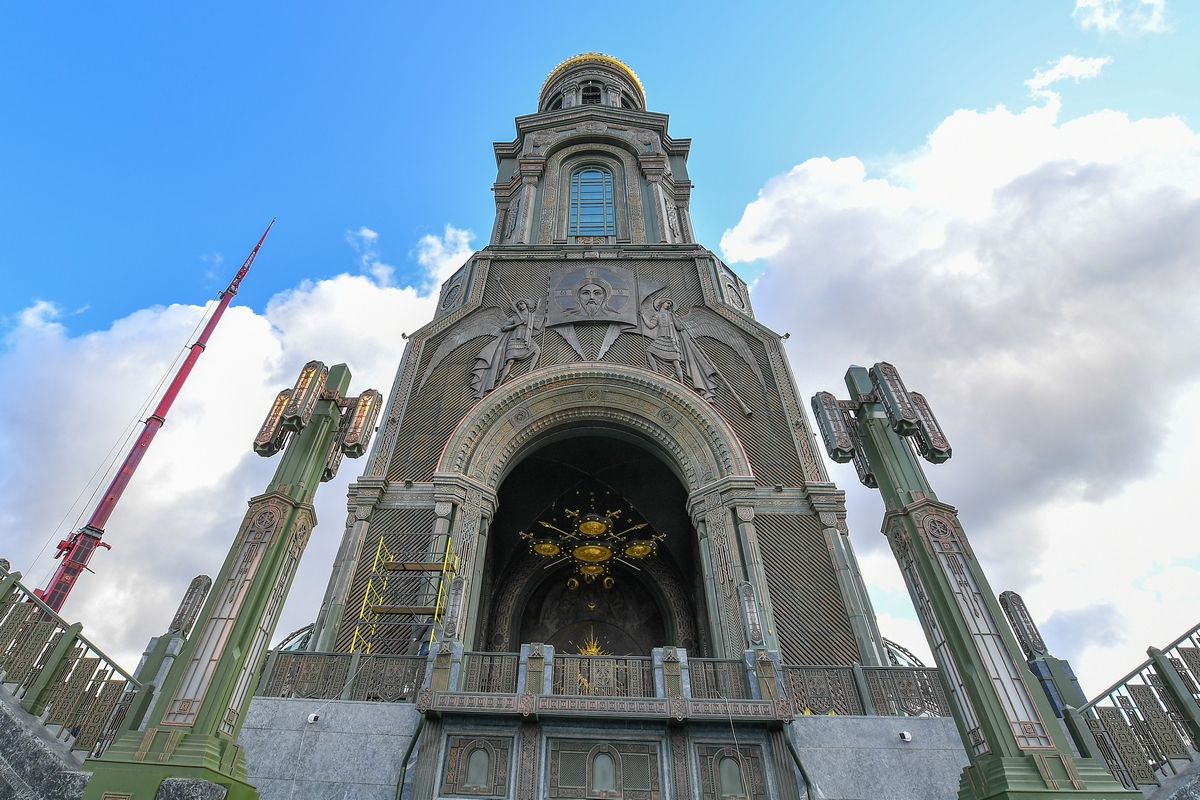

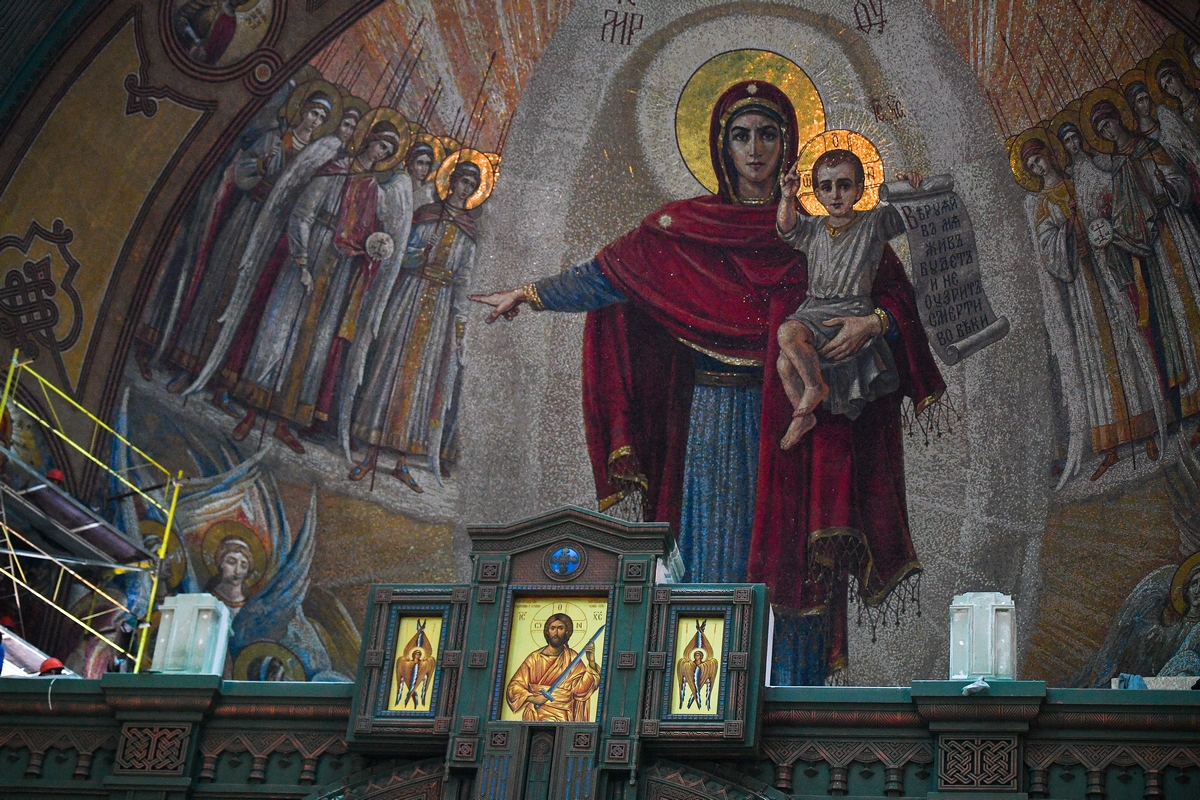

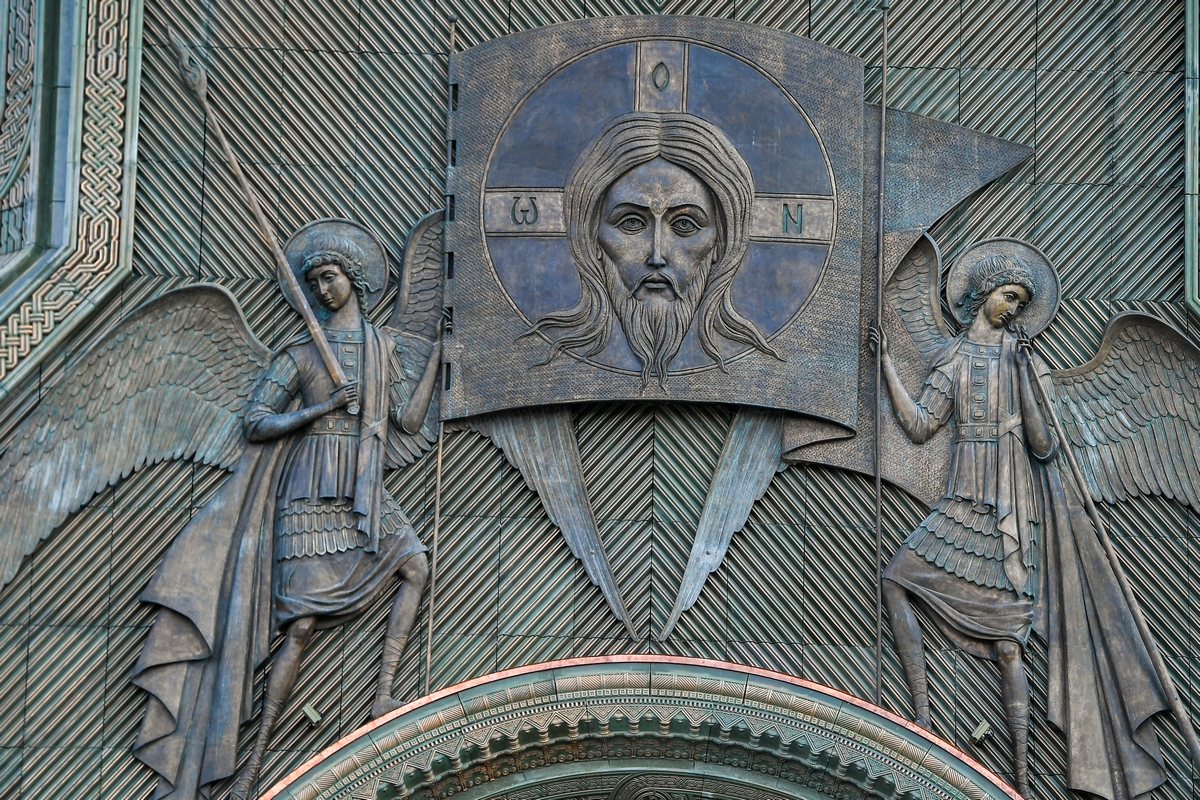

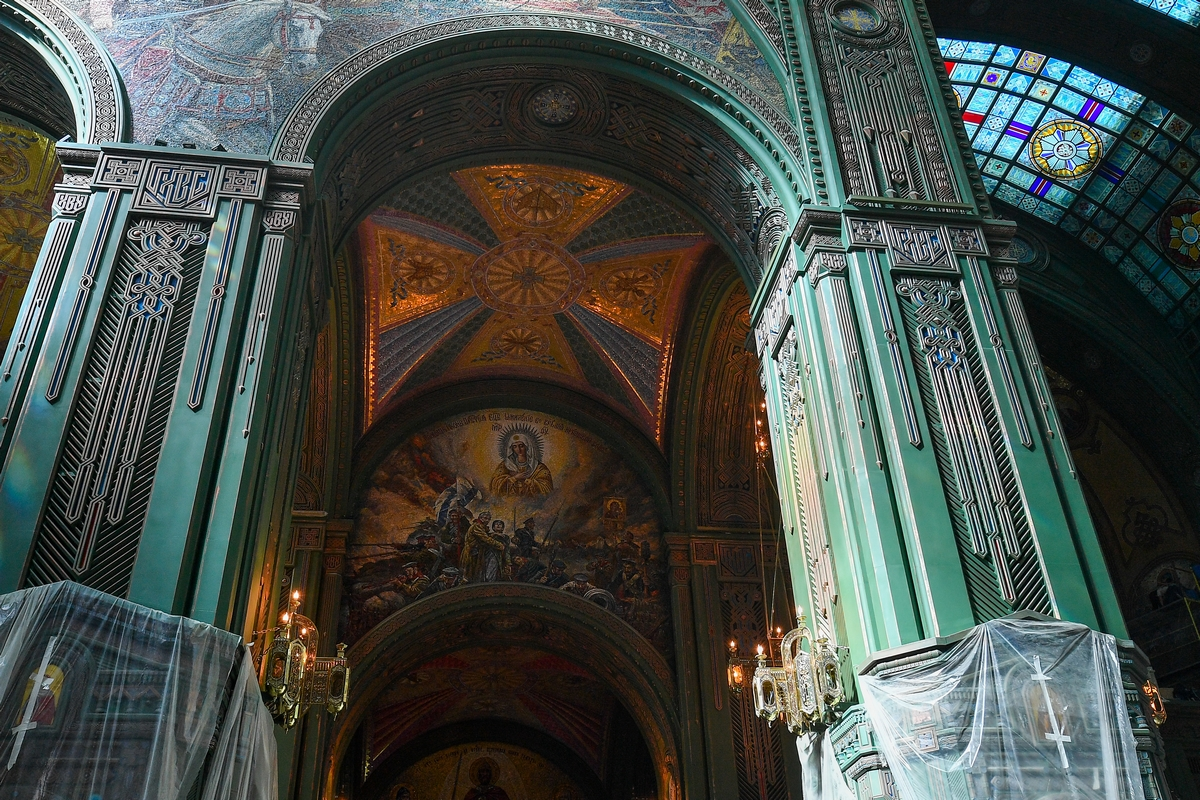

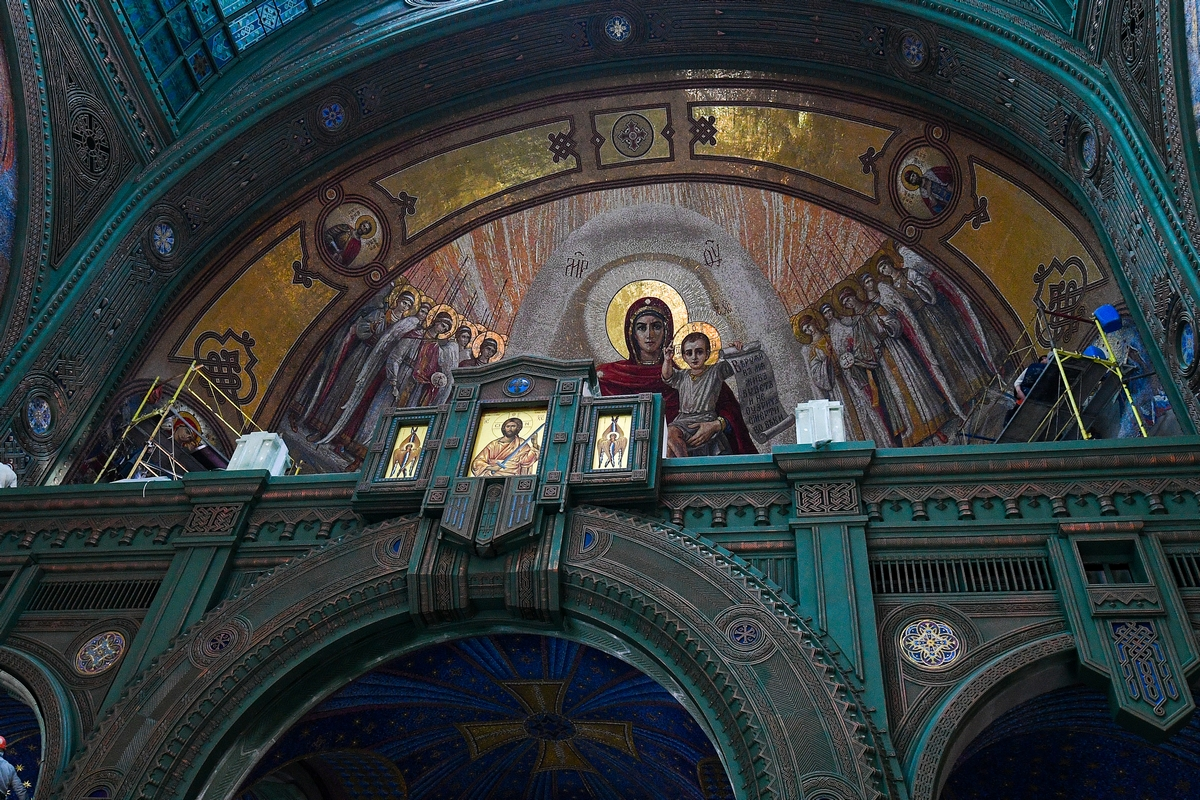

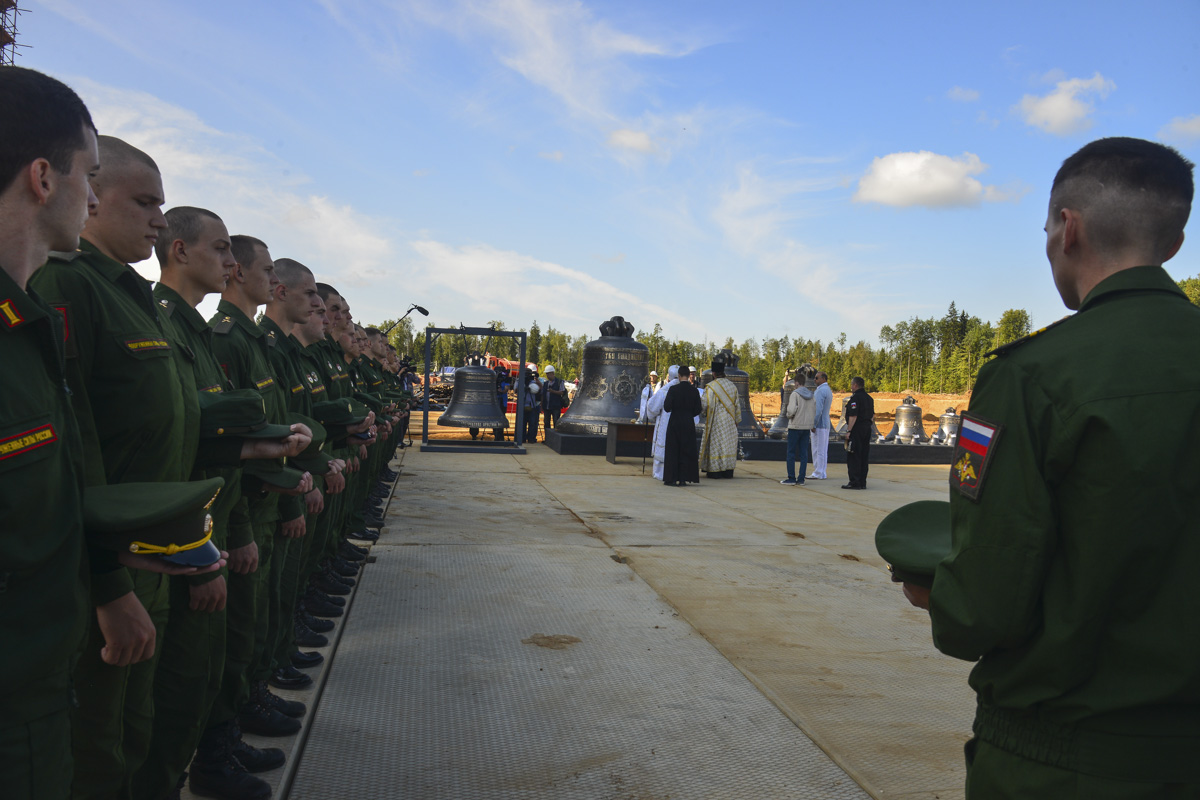

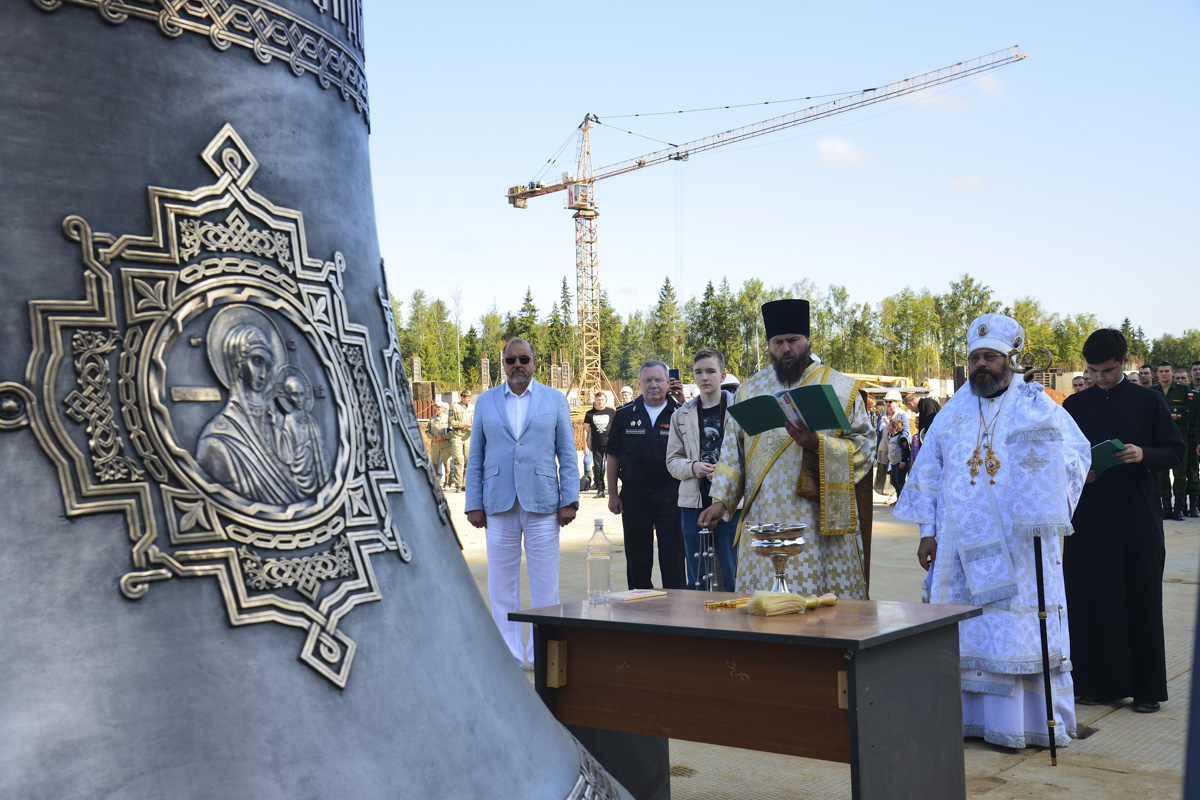

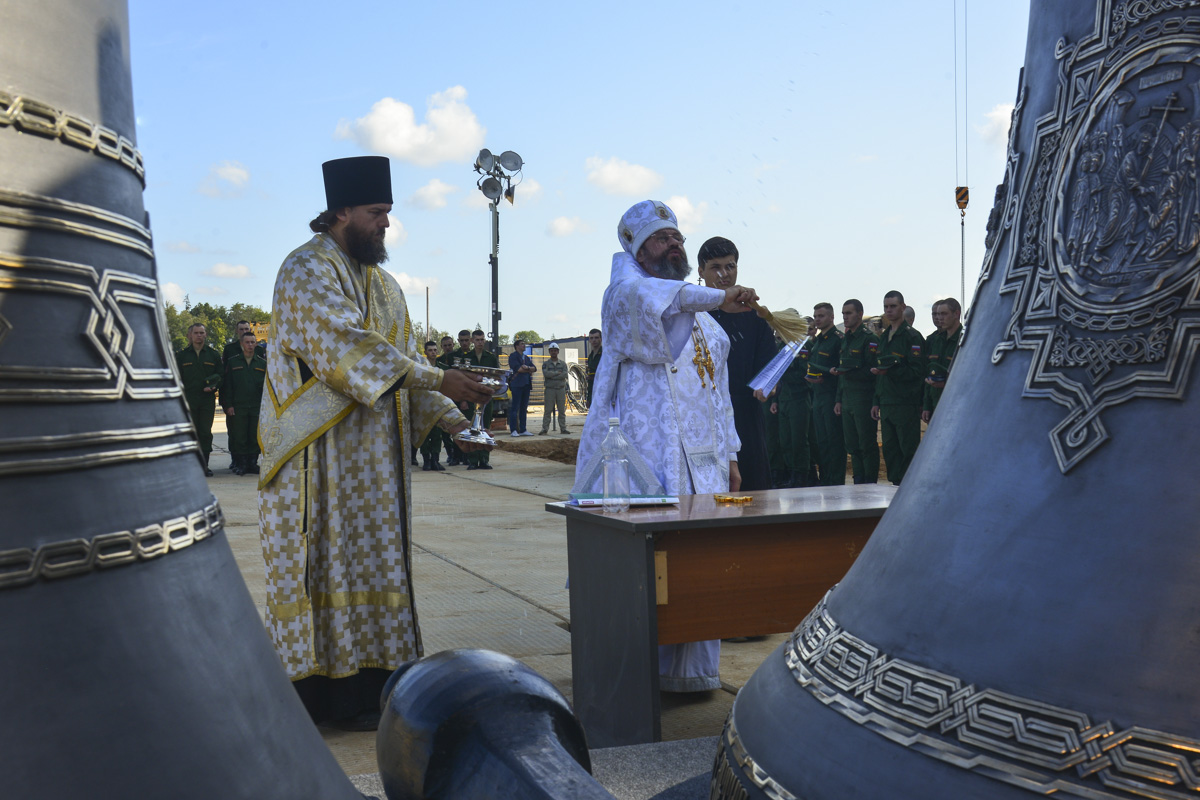

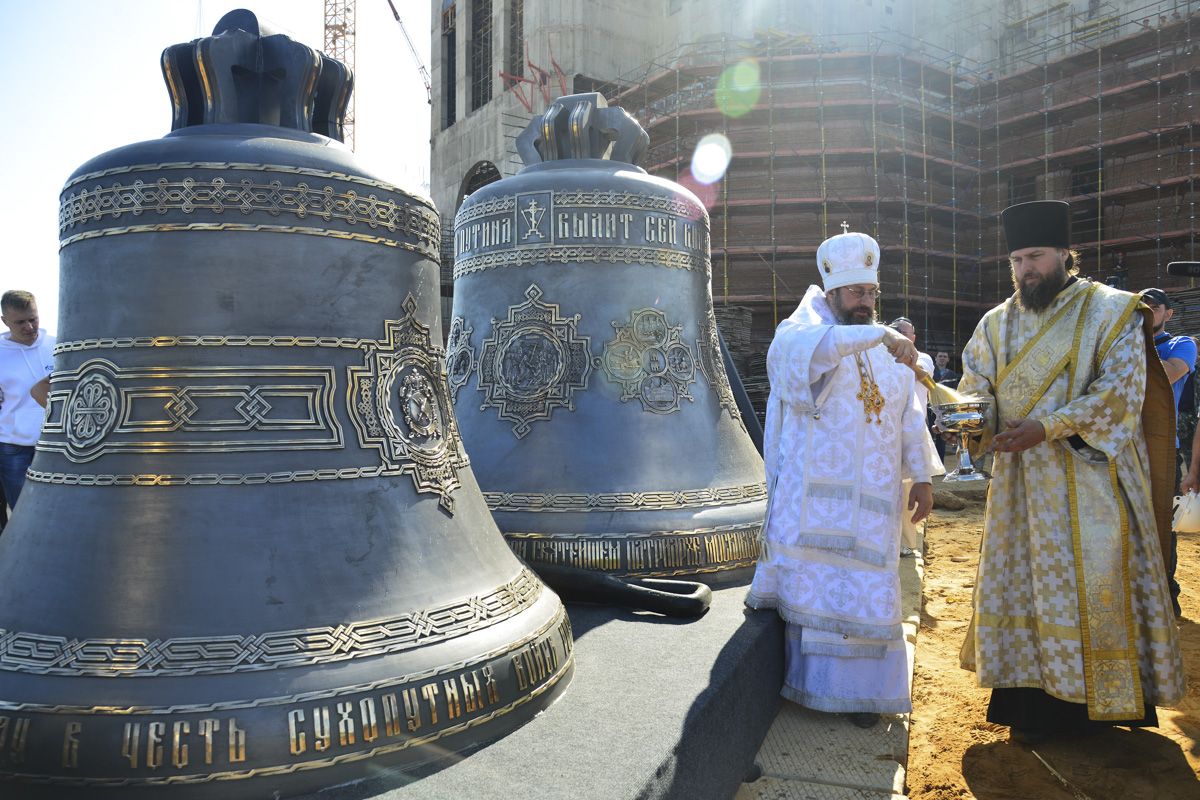

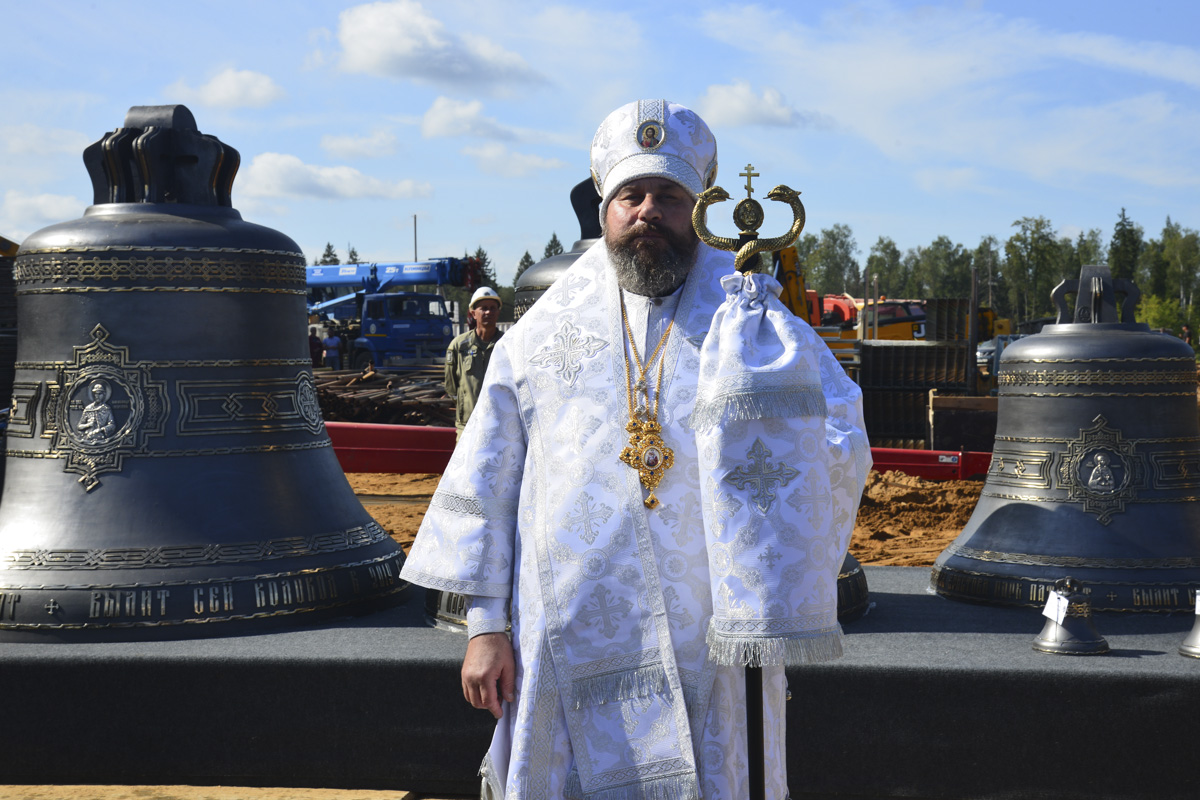

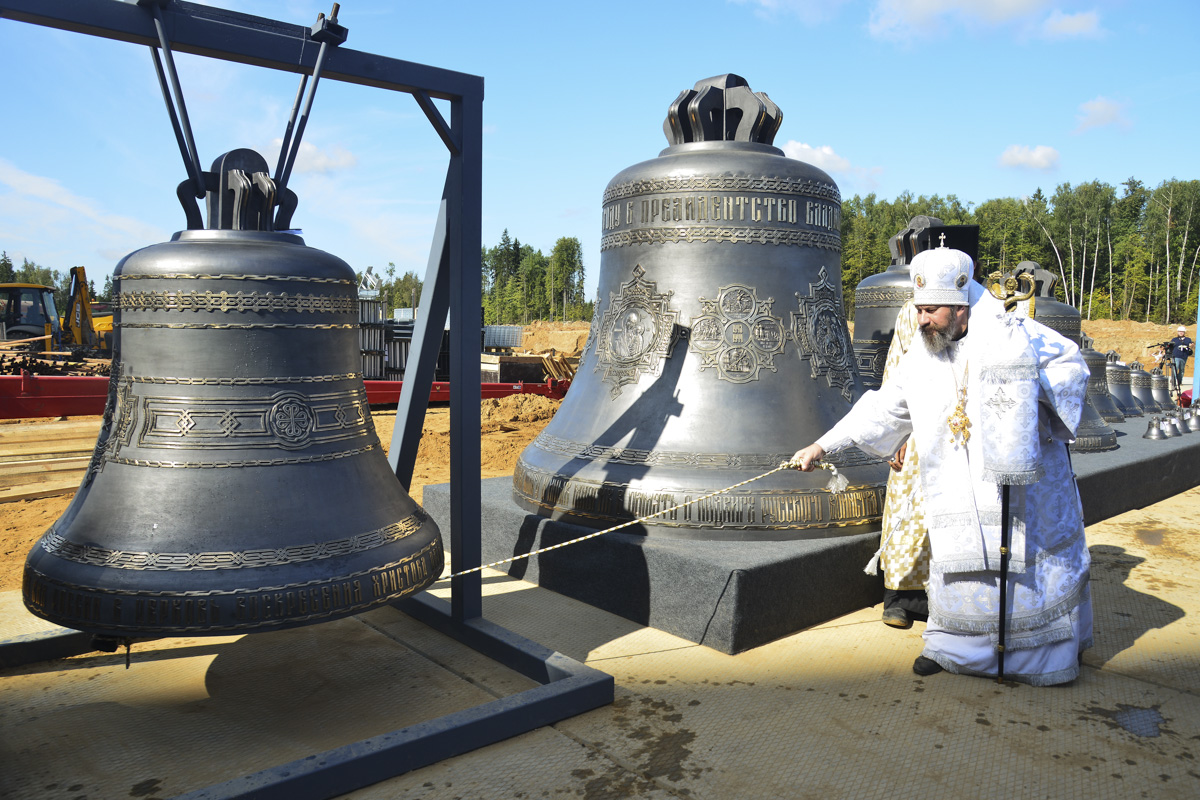

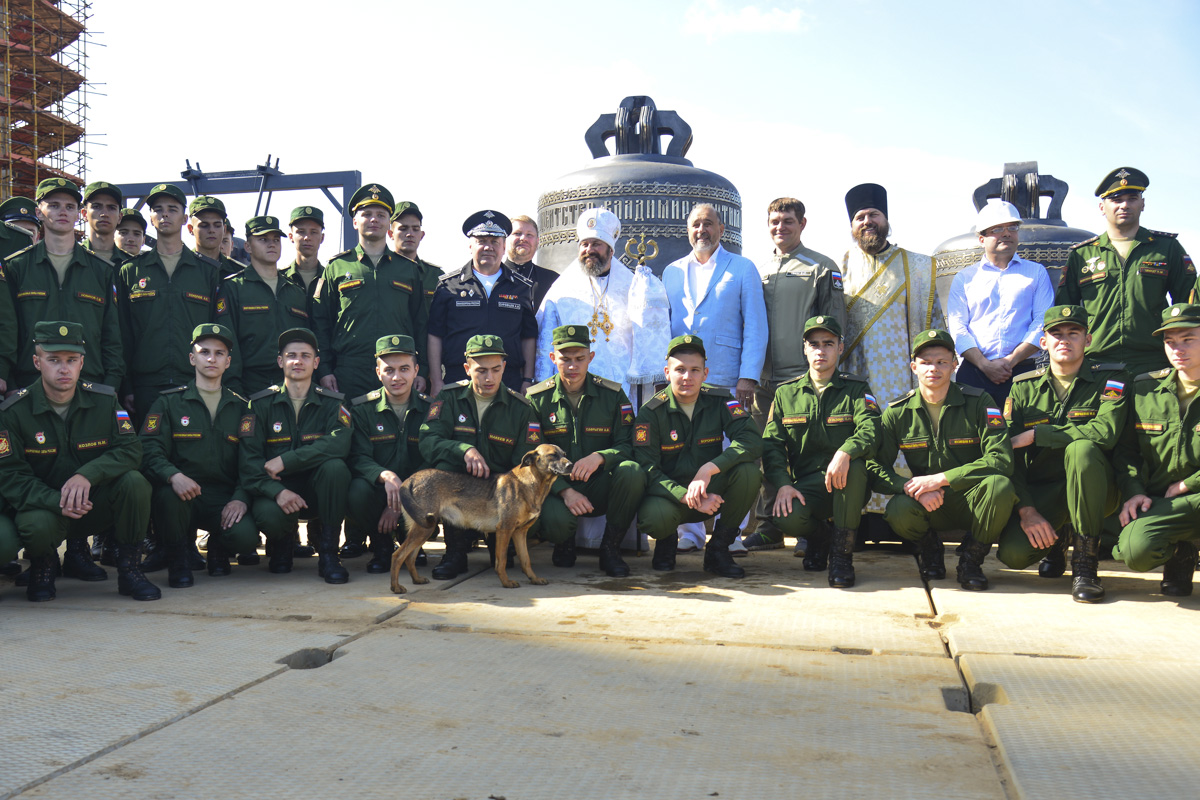

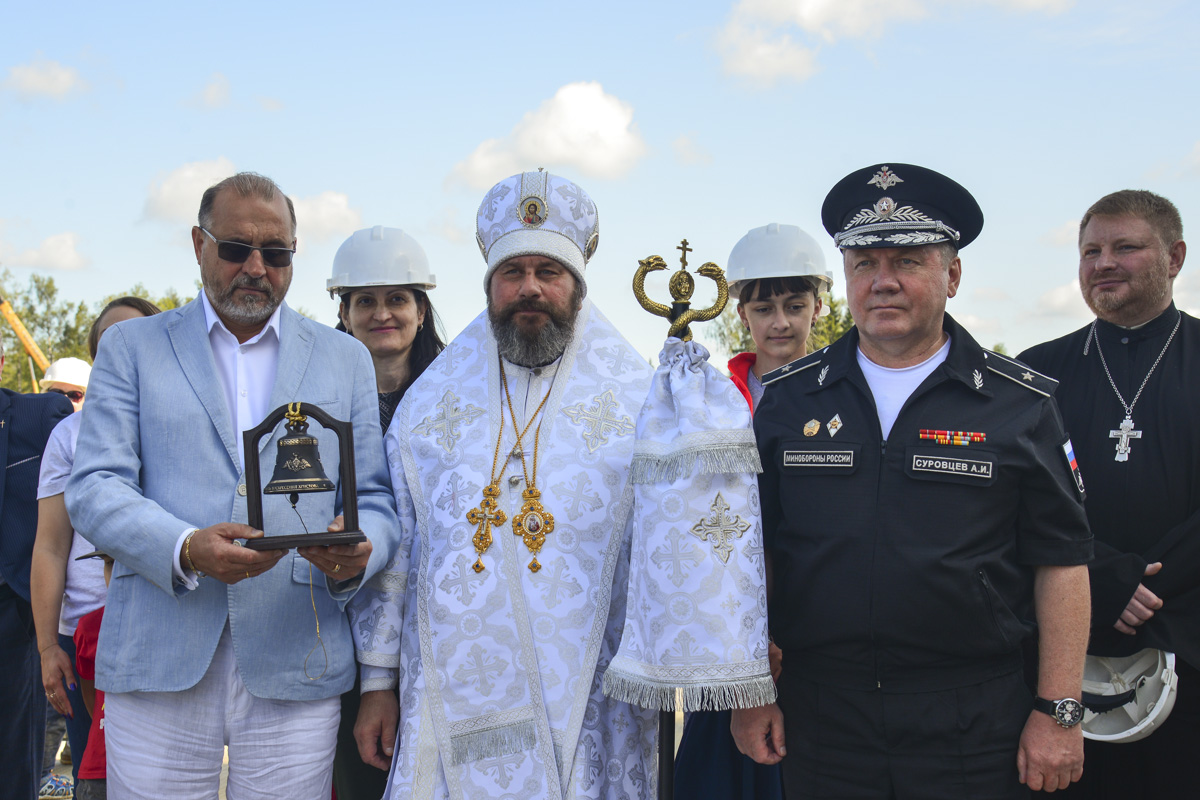

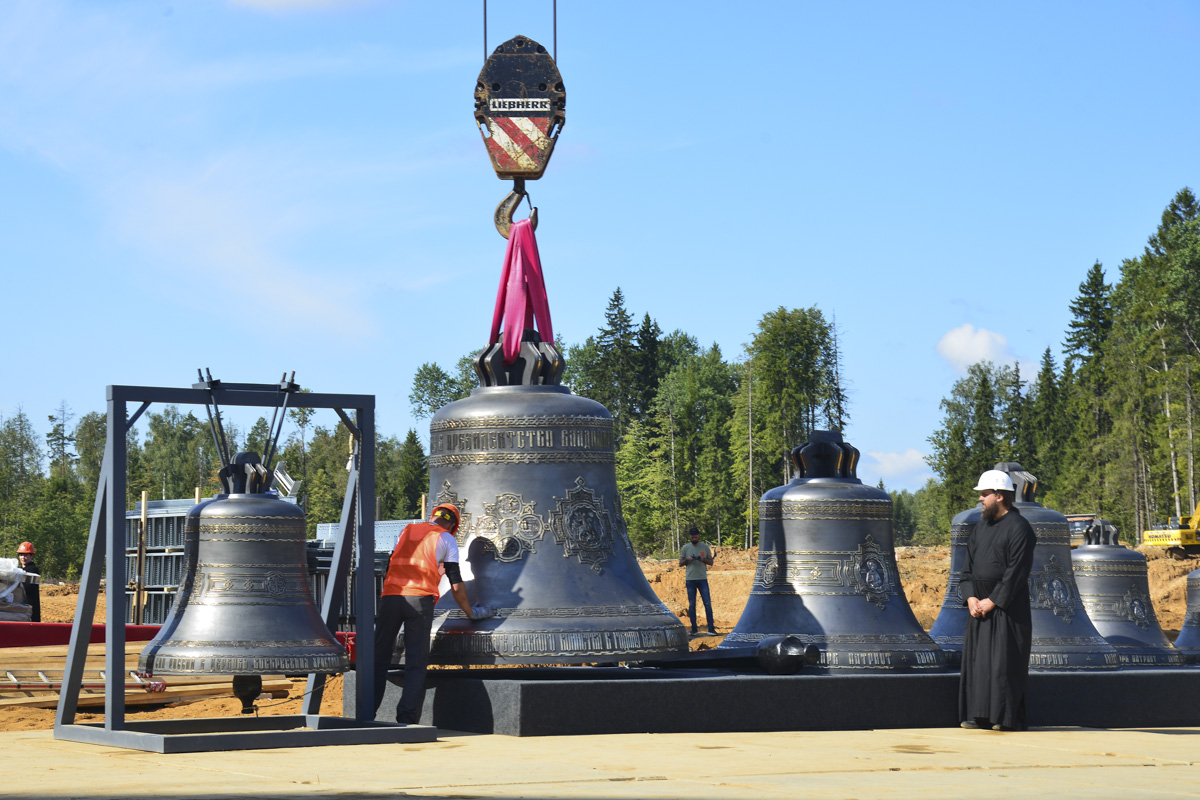

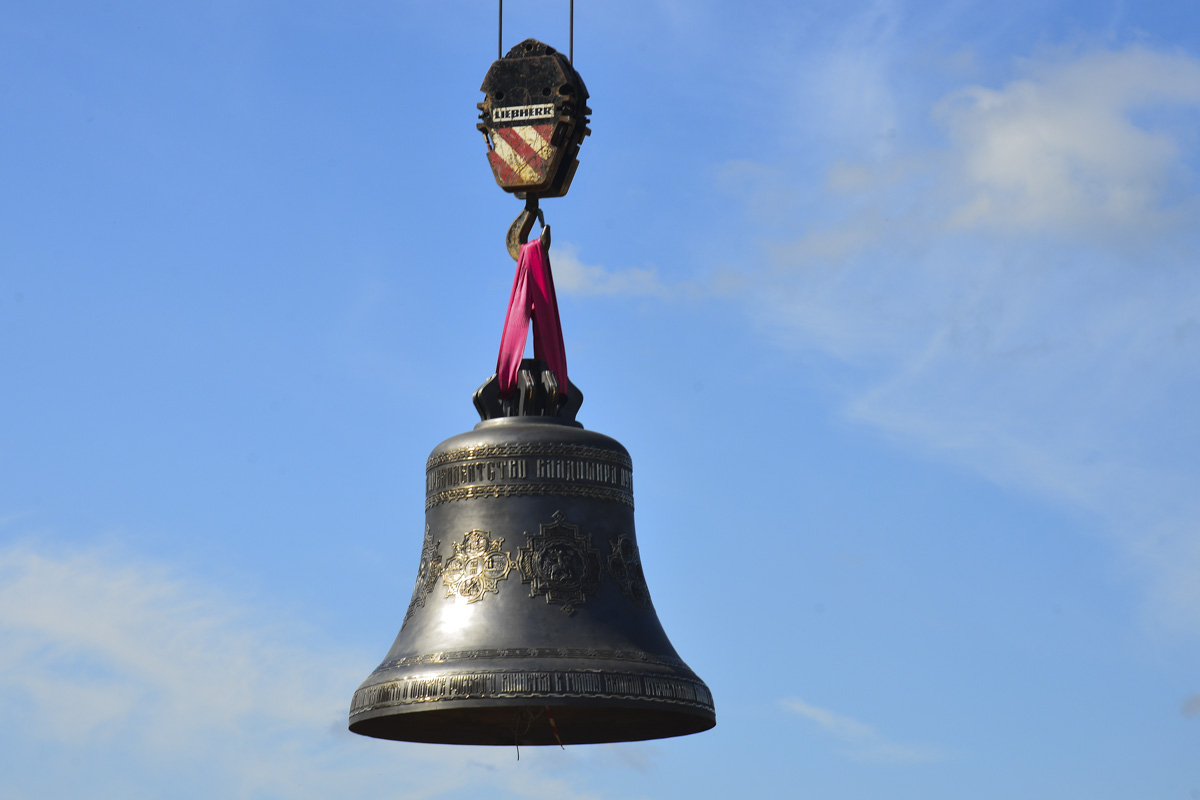

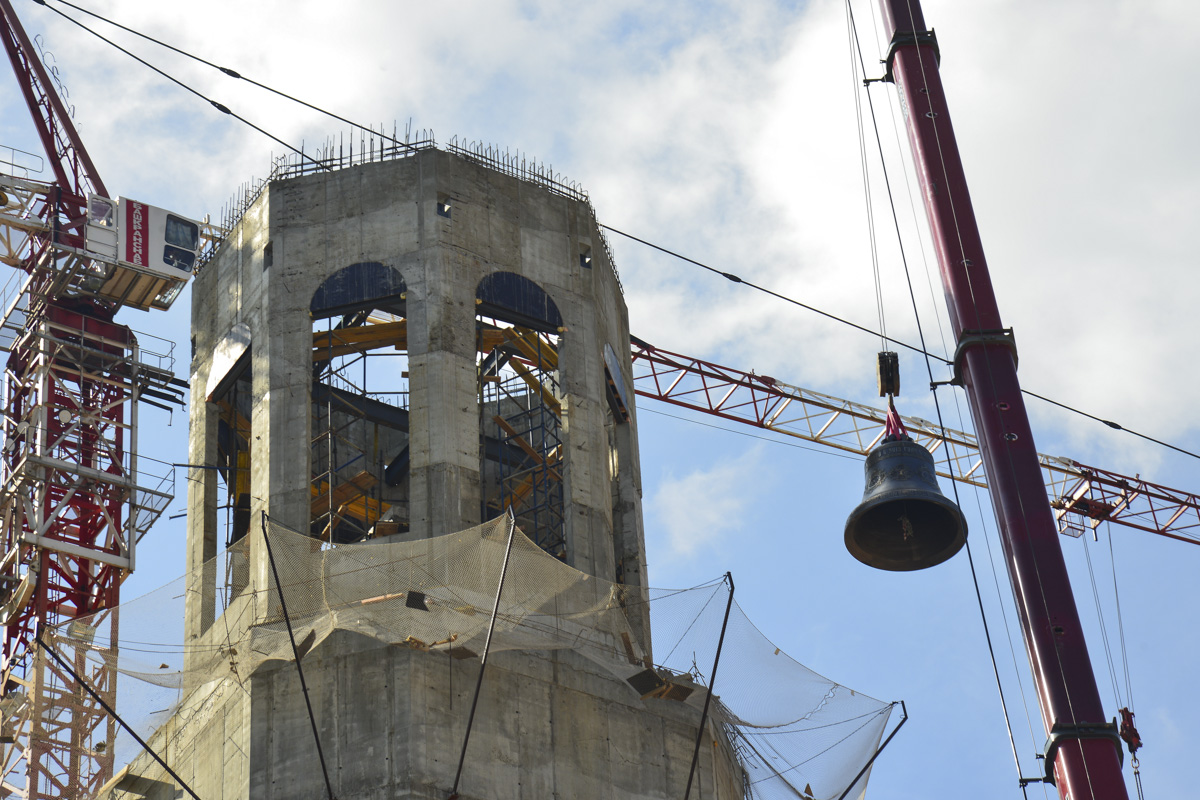

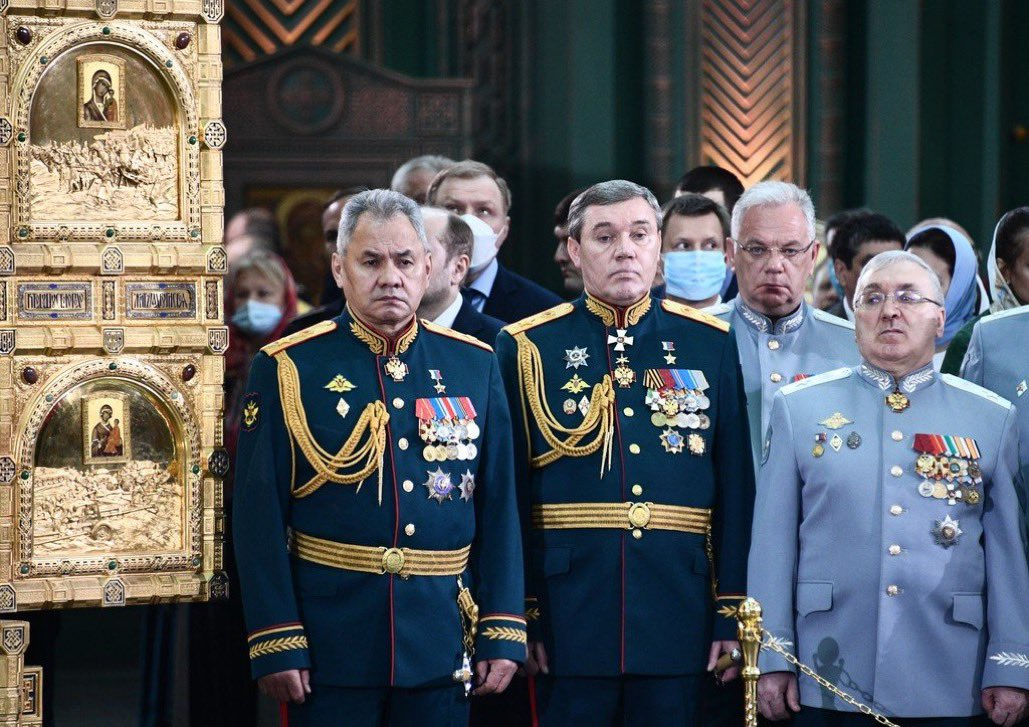

== See also ==
- Kronstadt Naval Cathedral
- List of largest Eastern Orthodox church buildings
- List of tallest domes
