= National Research University of Electronic Technology =

Technical university in Moscow, Russia

National Research University of Electronic Technology (MIET)
- Национальный исследовательский университет "МИЭТ" (МИЭТ)
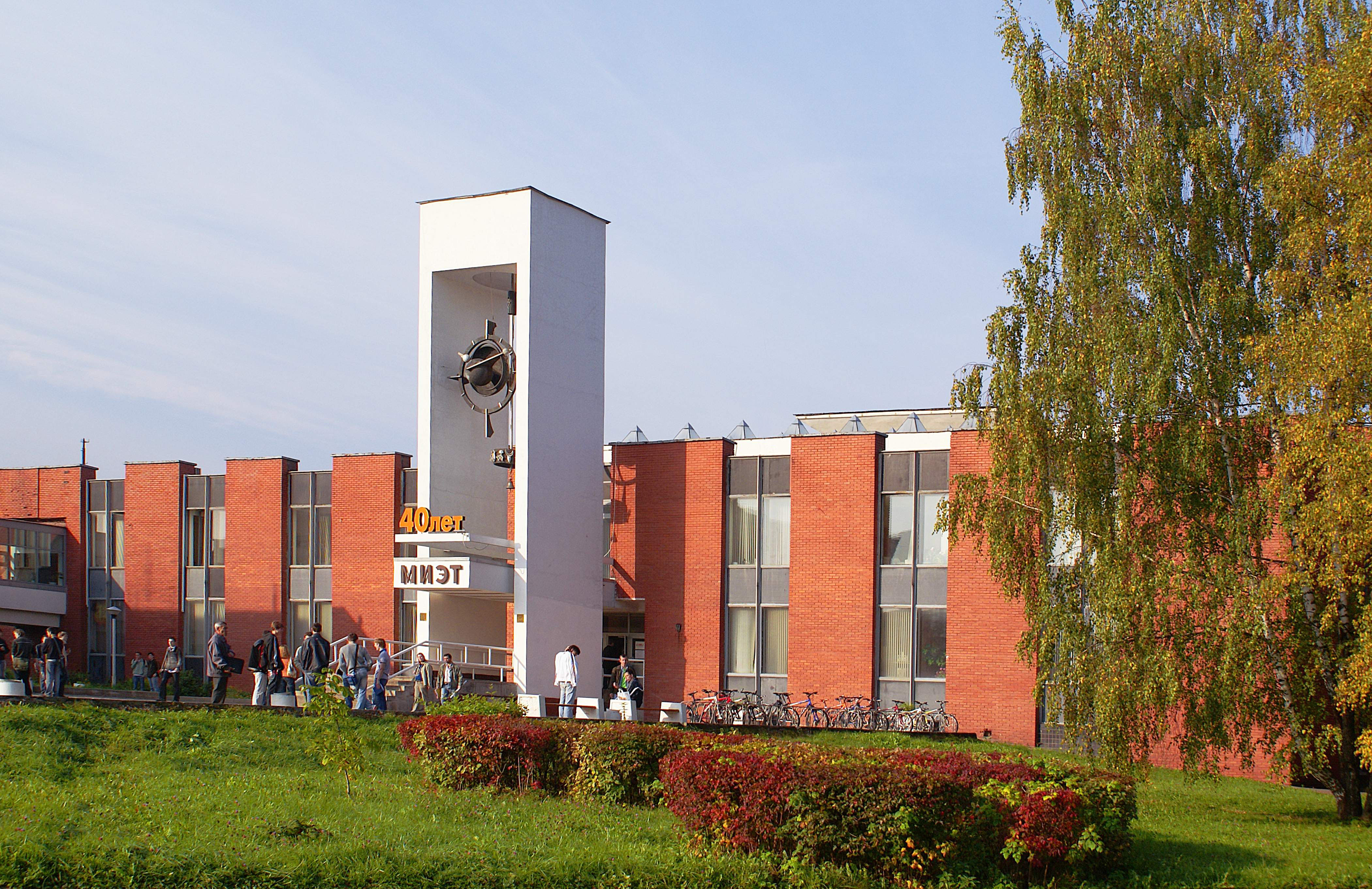
- Main building of MIET
- Type: State
- Established: December 9, 1965
- President: Yuri Aleksandrovich Chaplygin
- Rector: Sergei Aleksandrovich Gavrilov
- Scientific supervisor: Vladimir Aleksandrovich Bespalov
- Academic staff: 361 (regular job) and 186 (second job) (2023)
- Students: 5606 (2023)
- Postgraduates: 197 (2023)
- Location: Zelenograd, Moscow, Russia; 55°59′0″N 37°12′30″E
- Colors: White and blue
- Website: http://www.miet.ru/ (in Russian) https://eng.miet.ru/ (in English)

University rankings

Regional – Overall
- QS Emerging Europe and Central Asia: 221-230 (2022)

National Research University of Electronic Technology (Russian: Национальный исследовательский университет "Московский институт электронной техники" / МИЭТ, lit. National Research University "Moscow Institute of Electronic Technology") is a Russian technical university in the field of microelectronics, information and computer technologies and one of 29 National Research Universities. University was founded in 1965 and is based in Zelenograd, Moscow (the Soviet Union's center for electronic and microelectronic design and engineering).

== Architecture ==
The University complex was designed by the architects Felix Novikov and Grigory Saevich and built in 1967-1971. The main administrative building (#1) with library and five lecture halls, the assembly hall (#2) with dining hall, two academic buildings (#3 and #4), and sports complex (#5) of multipurpose arena and swimming pool were built of red bricks and connected by passages in united complex. The decoration of the exterior walls of the library is the white bas-relief (970 m²) "The Becoming of a Homo sapiens" (Russian: Становление человека разумного, Stanovlenie cheloveka razumnogo) completed in 1974 by the sculptor Ernst Neizvestny. The main facades of the main administrative building and the assembly hall are turned to Shokin's Square (Russian: Площадь Шокина, Ploshchad Shokina), named after Alexander Shokin (1909-1988), the USSR Minister of Electronic Industry, one of founders of Zelenograd and MIET.

== Memorials ==
Shokin's bust installed in the park near to Shokin's Square, and Skokin's and Presnukhin's (the first rector) memorial plates are placed on the main administrative building facade.

== Institutes and educational programs ==
- Institute of Biomedical Systems
  - Biotechnical systems and technologies
- Institute of High-Tech Law, Social Science and Humanities
  - Legal support for national security
- Institute of Linguistic and Pedagogical Education
  - Linguistic
- Institute of International Education
- Institute of Integral Electronics
  - Electronics and nanoelectronics
- Institute of Microdevices and Control Systems
  - Computer science and engineering
  - Radio engineering
  - Control of technical systems
- Institute of Nano- and Microsystem Engineering
  - Design and technology of electronic facilities
- Institute of Advanced Materials and Technologies
  - Nanomaterials
  - Material science and technologies
  - Technosphere safety
- Institute of System and Software Engineering and Information Technologies
  - Applied computer science
  - Software engineering
  - Quality control
- Institute of Physics and Applied Mathematics
- Institute of Digital Design
  - Design
  - Information systems and technologies
- Military Educational Center
  - military specialties for Air Defence of the Russian Ground Forces
- Educational programs outside institutes
  - Infocommunication technologies and systems
  - Information security
  - Management
  - Applied mathematics

== Rectors ==
- Leonid Viktorovich Ershov – 1966 (acting)
- Leonid Nikolaevich Presnukhin – 1966–88
- Vitali Dmitrievich Verner – 1988–98
- Yuri Aleksandrovich Chaplygin – 1998–2016
- Vladimir Aleksandrovich Bespalov – 2016–2024
- Sergei Aleksandrovich Gavrilov – 2024-2025 (acting), 2025-...

== Notes ==
The university can be also referred to as Moscow Institute of Electronic Engineering in the English language sources, which was its English official name in the 1990s.

== See also ==
- Moscow Institute of Electronics and Mathematics, another Russian technical institute founded in 1960s within the scope of the Soviet microelectronics program
