= Ruscism =

Term describing Russian political ideology

A combination of Saint George's ribbon and the letter Z, two symbols associated with Ruscism. The combination of these symbols has been compared to the Nazi swastika, and is sometimes called zwastika.

Ruscism (/ˈrʌʃɪzəm/ RUSH-iz-əm), sometimes Rashism (Note: Russian: рашизм, romanized: rashizm; Ukrainian: рашизм, romanized: rashyzm.) or Russism (Note: Russian: русизм, romanized: rusizm.) (and also referred to as Russian fascism), (Note: Ukrainian: російський фашизм, romanized: rosiyskyy fashyzm; Russian: российский фашизм, romanized: rossiyskiy fashizm.) is a pejorative portmanteau and neologism used to describe the political ideology, social practices, and aggressive foreign policy of Russia under Vladimir Putin, characterizing the regime as neo-fascist. It combines Russian ultranationalism, neo-imperial expansionism, militarism, the doctrine of the "Russian world", state propaganda and a cult of personality around Putin.

Originally popularized in 1995 during the First Chechen War by Dzhokhar Dudayev, the term gained widespread international currency during the Russian invasion of Ukraine, leading to its designation as Russia's state ideology by the Ukrainian parliament and its formal condemnation by the NATO Parliamentary Assembly (Note: The NATO Parliamentary Assembly is an inter-parliamentary organization composed of legislators from NATO member states; although institutionally separate from NATO itself, it serves as a consultative link between the alliance and national parliaments.) in 2023.

The term is a subject of scholarly debate. While scholars such as Timothy D. Snyder and Vladislav Inozemtsev argue that modern Russia meets the criteria of a fascist state, others such as Stanley G. Payne and Roger Griffin characterize it as an aggressive, conservative autocracy or mafia state. The Russian government rejects the term, and state censor Roskomnadzor has ordered internet platforms to censor it.

== Etymology ==
"Ruscism", "Rashism", and "Russism" are portmanteaus combining 'Russia' and 'fascism'. They transliterate the term, reflecting English, Ukrainian, and Russian pronunciations.

== History of the use of the term ==
=== Chechen Wars ===
The term, in the form Russism (Russian: русизм, romanized: rusizm), was coined and popularized in 1995 by the president of the Chechen Republic of Ichkeria Dzhokhar Dudayev, who saw the military action by Russia in Chechnya as a manifestation of the rising ideology. According to Dudayev, Ruscism is:

a variety of hatred ideology which is based on Great Russian chauvinism, spiritlessness and immorality. It differs from other forms of fascism, racism, and nationalism by a more extreme cruelty, both to man and to nature. It is based on the destruction of everything and everyone, the tactics of scorched earth. Ruscism is a schizophrenic variety of the world domination complex. This is a distinct version of slave psychology, it grows like a parasite on the fabricated history, occupied territories and oppressed peoples.

The term was later used by the next president of the Chechen Republic of Ichkeria, Aslan Maskhadov, who considered Ruscism a variety of fascism, but more dangerous than fascism and having existed for the last 200 years. The Chechen news website Kavkaz Center featured a regular column titled "Russism", in which around 150 articles were published between 2003 and 2016.

=== Russo-Ukrainian War ===
March in memory of the assassinated Boris Nemtsov in Moscow, 27 February 2016. View from inside the march: "Let's stop Ruscism" (Russian: Остановим рашизм)

The term became increasingly common in Ukrainian media after the annexation of Crimea by the Russian Federation, the downing of Malaysia Airlines Flight 17 near Donetsk on 17 July 2014, and the start of the Russo-Ukrainian War in 2014. It appears in the Russian-language song "That's, Baby, Ruscism! (Orthodox Fascism!)" by Ukrainian composer and singer-songwriter Borys Sevastianov.

In May 2022, the Committee of the Verkhovna Rada on Humanitarian and Information Policy supported the initiative of Ukrainian scientists, journalists, political scientists and civil society to promote and recognize the term "Ruscism" at the national and international levels.

=== Russian invasion of Ukraine ===
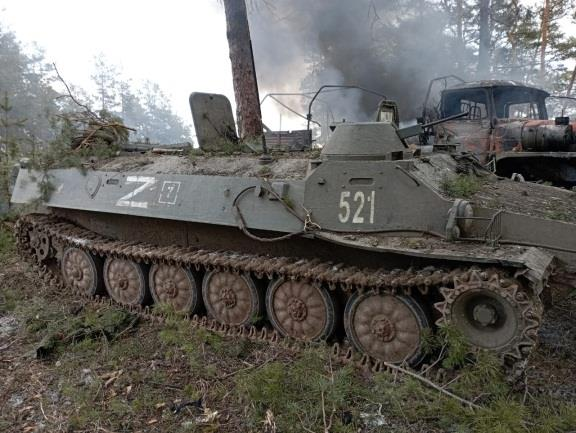
A destroyed Russian MT-LB with a Z symbol during the Russian invasion of Ukraine. The symbol has been associated with Russian fascism.

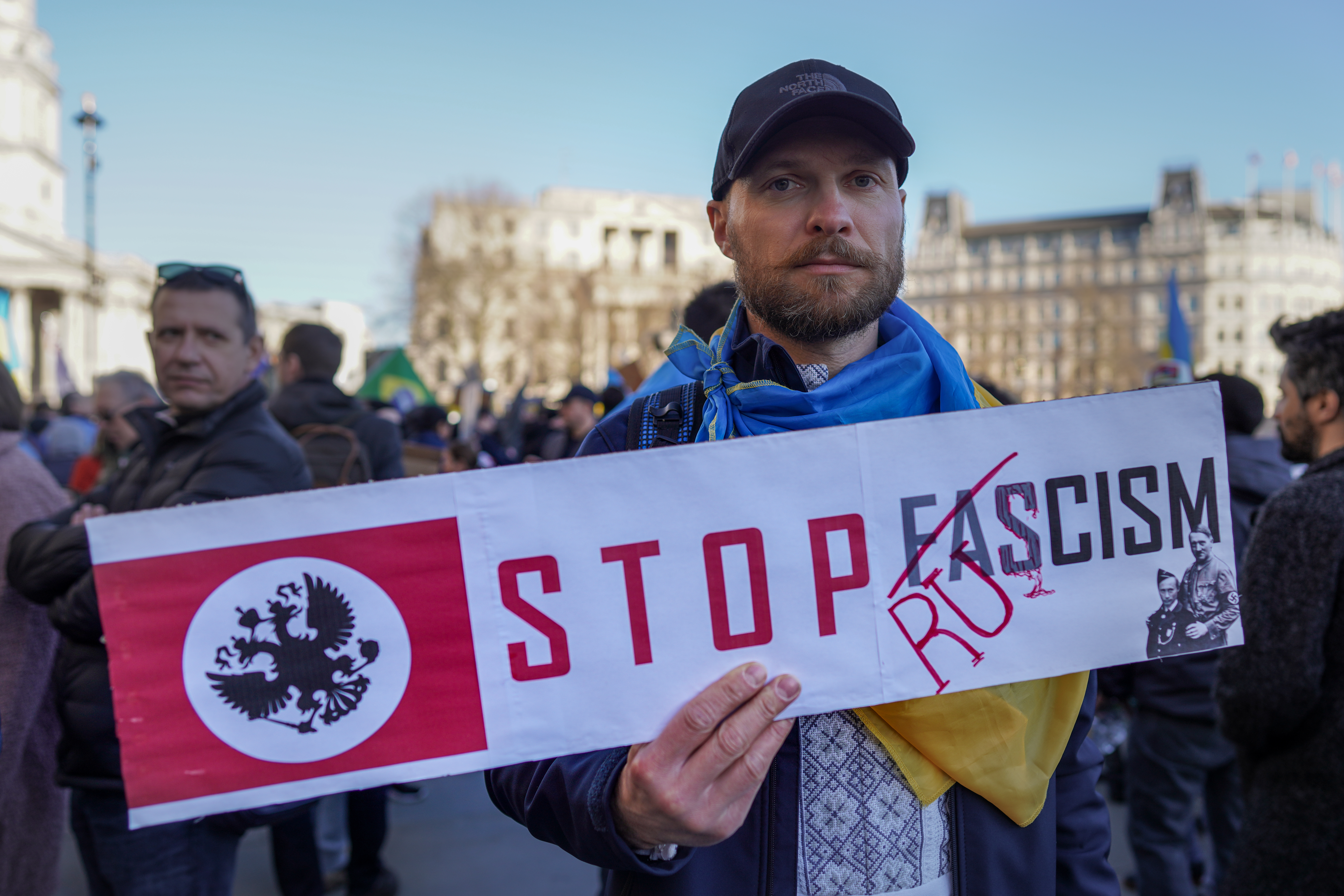
A poster against Ruscism in a pro-Ukraine protest in London's Trafalgar Square

During the 2022 Russian invasion of Ukraine, terms like Rashyzm and Rashyst entered widespread usage across Ukrainian military, political, and media discourse. Oleksiy Danilov, Secretary of the National Security and Defense Council of Ukraine, publicly advocated for the term "Ruscism", arguing that modern Russian militarism and destruction had surpassed classical 20th-century fascism. On 23 April 2022, Ukrainian President Volodymyr Zelenskyy stated that "Ruscism" would permanently enter global history textbooks, arguing that Russia's actions marked a resurgence of total barbarism in Europe not seen in eighty years.

On 2 May 2023, the Verkhovna Rada officially recognized Ruscism as the state ideology of Russia. According to the Rada's definition, Ruscism is "militarism, cult of the leader's personality and sacralisation of state institutions, self-glorification of the Russian Federation through violent oppression and/or denial of the existence of other ethnicities, the imposition of the Russian language and culture on other peoples, propaganda of the Russian world doctrine, systemic violation of norms and principles of the international law, sovereign rights of other countries, their territorial integrity, and internationally recognised borders".

On 22 May 2023, the NATO Parliamentary Assembly officially used the term Ruscism to describe the ideology and practices of Russia in Declaration 482, article 20. In March 2024, American President Joe Biden in his 2024 State of the Union Address explicitly drew historical parallels between Putin's territorial conquests and those of Adolf Hitler in World War II-era Europe.

== Ideological influences and key figures ==
=== Ivan Ilyin ===
Timothy D. Snyder of Yale University believes that the ideology of Putin and his regime was influenced by Russian nationalist philosopher Ivan Ilyin (1883–1954). A number of Ilyin's works advocated fascism. Ilyin has been quoted by Vladimir Putin, and is considered by observers to be a major ideological inspiration for Putin. Putin was personally involved in moving Ilyin's remains back to Russia, and in 2009 consecrated his grave.

According to Snyder, Ilyin "provided a metaphysical and moral justification for political totalitarianism" in the form of a fascist state, and today "his ideas have been revived and celebrated by Vladimir Putin".

Ilyin's book, Our Tasks, was in 2013 recommended as essential reading for state officials by the Russian government, while What Dismemberment of Russia Would Mean for the World is said to have been "read and reread" by Putin according to The Economist.

=== Aleksandr Dugin ===
Dugin speaking to Western journalists in March 2022 where he asserted that "We are not a part of the global civilization. We are a civilization of our own. We had no other possibility to prove that without attacking Ukraine"

In 1997, Russian thinker Aleksandr Dugin, widely known for fascistic views, published The Foundations of Geopolitics: The Geopolitical Future of Russia, a book believed to have garnered significant impact among Russia's military, police and foreign policy elites. In it, he argued that Ukraine should be annexed by Russia because "Ukraine as a state has no geopolitical meaning", "no particular cultural import or universal significance, no geographic uniqueness, no ethnic exclusiveness", that "[its] certain territorial ambitions represen[t] an enormous danger for all of Eurasia and, without resolving the Ukrainian problem, it is in general senseless to speak about continental politics". He argued that Ukraine should not be allowed to remain independent, unless it is a "sanitary cordon", which would be "inadmissible". The book may have been influential in Vladimir Putin's foreign policy, which eventually led to the 2022 Russian invasion of Ukraine.

Also in 1997, Dugin hailed what he saw as the arrival of a "genuine, true, radically revolutionary and consistent, fascist fascism" in Russia, in an article titled "Fascism – Borderless and Red"; previously in 1992, he had in another article defended "fascism" as not having anything to do with "the racist and chauvinist aspects of National Socialism", stating in contrast that "Russian fascism is a combination of natural national conservatism with a passionate desire for true changes." Another of Dugin's books, The Fourth Political Theory, published in 2009, has been cited as an inspiration for Russian policy in events such as the war in Donbas, and for the contemporary European far-right in general.

Although there is a dispute on the extent of the personal relationship between Dugin and Putin, Dugin's influence exists broadly in Russian military and security circles. He became a lecturer at the Military Academy of the General Staff of the Armed Forces of Russia in the 1990s, and his Foundations of Geopolitics has become part of the curriculum there, as well as in several other military and police academies. According to John B. Dunlop of the Hoover Institution, "[t]here has perhaps not been another book published in Russia during the post-communist period that has exerted an influence on Russian military, police, and foreign policy elites comparable to that of [...] Foundations of Geopolitics."

=== Timofey Sergeitsev ===
According to Euractiv, Russian political operative Timofey Sergeitsev is "one of the ideologists of modern Russian fascism".

During the large-scale Russian invasion of Ukraine, when the victims of the Bucha massacre in Kyiv Oblast became known, the website of the Russian state news agency RIA Novosti published an article by Sergeitsev titled "What Russia Should Do with Ukraine", which was perceived to justify a Ukrainian genocide. It calls for repression, de-ukrainization, de-Europeanization, and ethnocide of the Ukrainians.

According to Oxford expert on Russian affairs Samuel Ramani, the article "represents mainstream Kremlin thinking". The head of the Latvian Ministry of Foreign Affairs, Edgars Rinkēvičs, called the article "ordinary fascism". Timothy D. Snyder described it as a "genocide handbook" and "one of the most openly genocidal documents I have ever seen".

=== Russian Orthodox Church ===
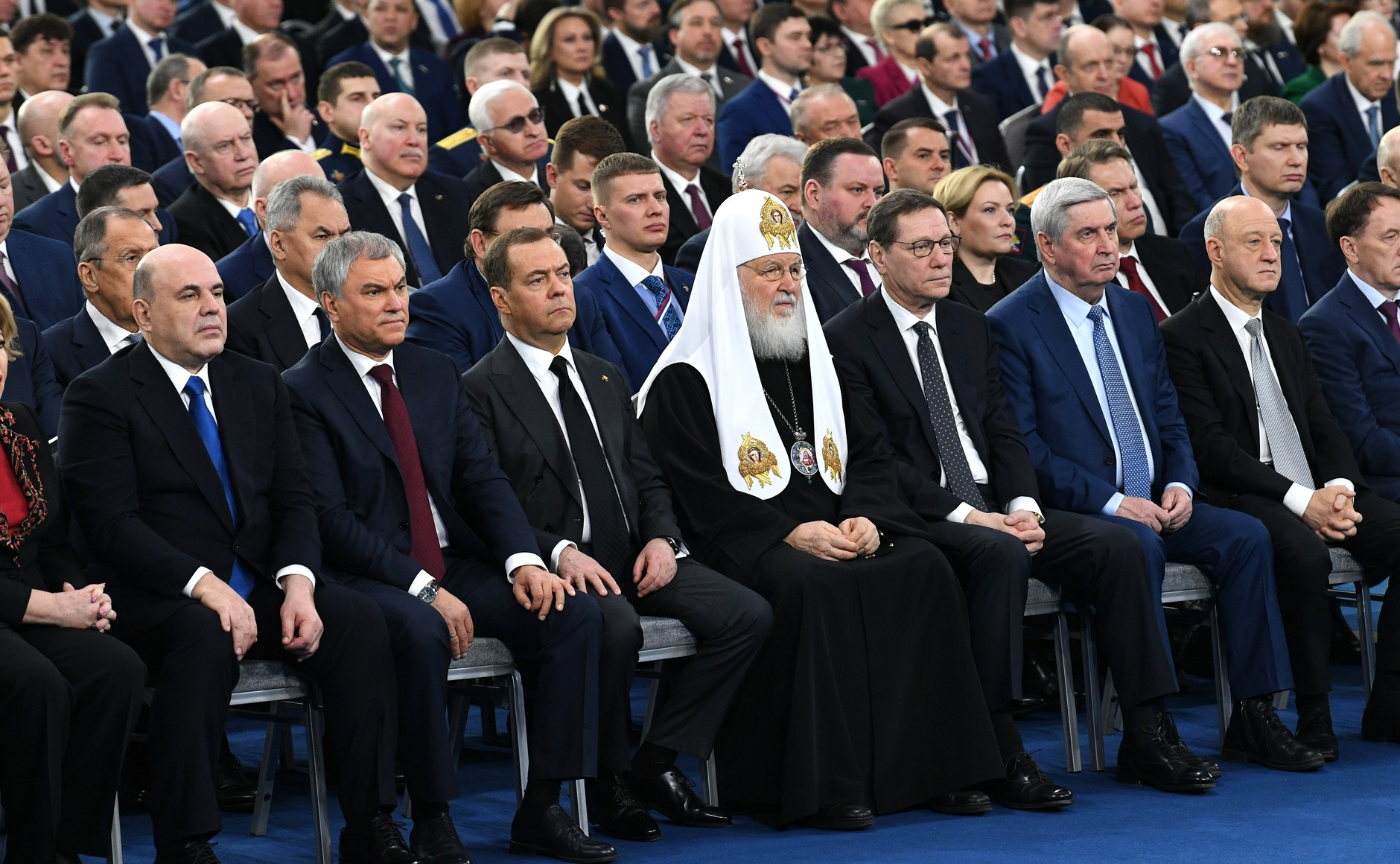
Patriarch Kirill sitting alongside Dmitry Medvedev during Vladimir Putin's speech on 21 February 2023

The Russian Orthodox Church (Moscow Patriarchate) officially deems the invasion of Ukraine to be a "holy war". During the World Russian People's Council in March 2024, it approved a document stating that this "holy war" was to defend "Holy Russia" and to protect the world from globalism and the West, which it said had "fallen into Satanism". The document further stated that all of Ukraine should come under Russia's sphere of influence, and that Ukrainians and Belarusians "should be recognised only as sub-ethnic groups of the Russians". Patriarch Kirill also issued a prayer for Russian victory in the war, and the church has punished or expelled priests who refuse to say it.

In late 2022, the Security Service of Ukraine (SSU) searched churches of the Ukrainian Orthodox Church (Moscow Patriarchate) in multiple Ukrainian cities and oblasts. The SSU found manuals from Patriarch Kirill on how propaganda can be spread through parishioners, as well as pro-Kremlin literature.

=== Vladislav Surkov ===
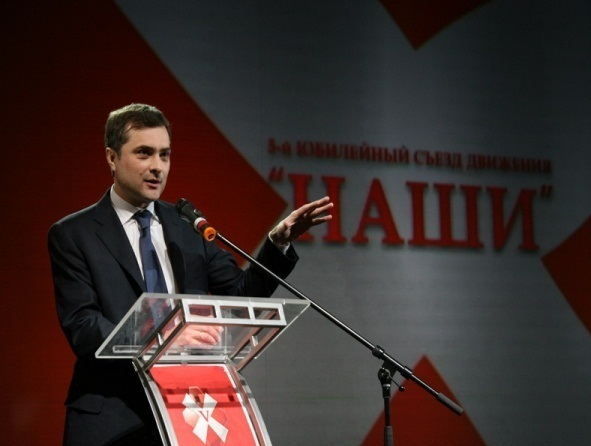
Surkov giving a speech to the Nashi Youth Movement, which has been likened to the Hitler Youth and dubbed the "Putinjugend".

From 1999 to February 2020 Vladislav Surkov was an influential Russian politician, often dubbed the "Grey Cardinal" and the Kremlin's main ideologist, commonly regarded as the mastermind of Putin's policies towards Ukraine. Surkov helped create pro-government youth movements, including the Nashi Youth Movement, meeting with their leaders and giving them lectures. The Nashi movement has been likened to the Hitler Youth and the Soviet-era Komsomol.

On 26 February 2020, Surkov gave an interview where he said that "There is no Ukraine. There is Ukrainianism ... it is a specific disorder of the mind, sudden passion for ethnography, taken to its extremes. ... It's a muddle instead of a state ... there is no nation".

=== Vladimir Putin ===
Russian president Vladimir Putin is known for denying Ukrainian and Belarusian nationhood, referring to Russians, Ukrainians and Belarusians as "one people" making up a triune Russian nation. He said there is "no historical basis" for the "idea of the Ukrainian people as a nation separate from the Russians". Putin has repeatedly denied Ukraine's right to exist, calling the country "an inalienable part of our own history, culture and spiritual space". He claimed that it was created by the Russian Bolsheviks and that it never had "real statehood". Moreover, Putin stated that the invasion of Ukraine was an attempt to reclaim "Russian" land.

Putin has described Russia as a "distinct civilization" and said that it must be preserved and protected by "genetics and other advanced technologies". He decreed in 2019 that all Russians be assigned "genetic passports" by 2025.

=== Dmitry Medvedev ===
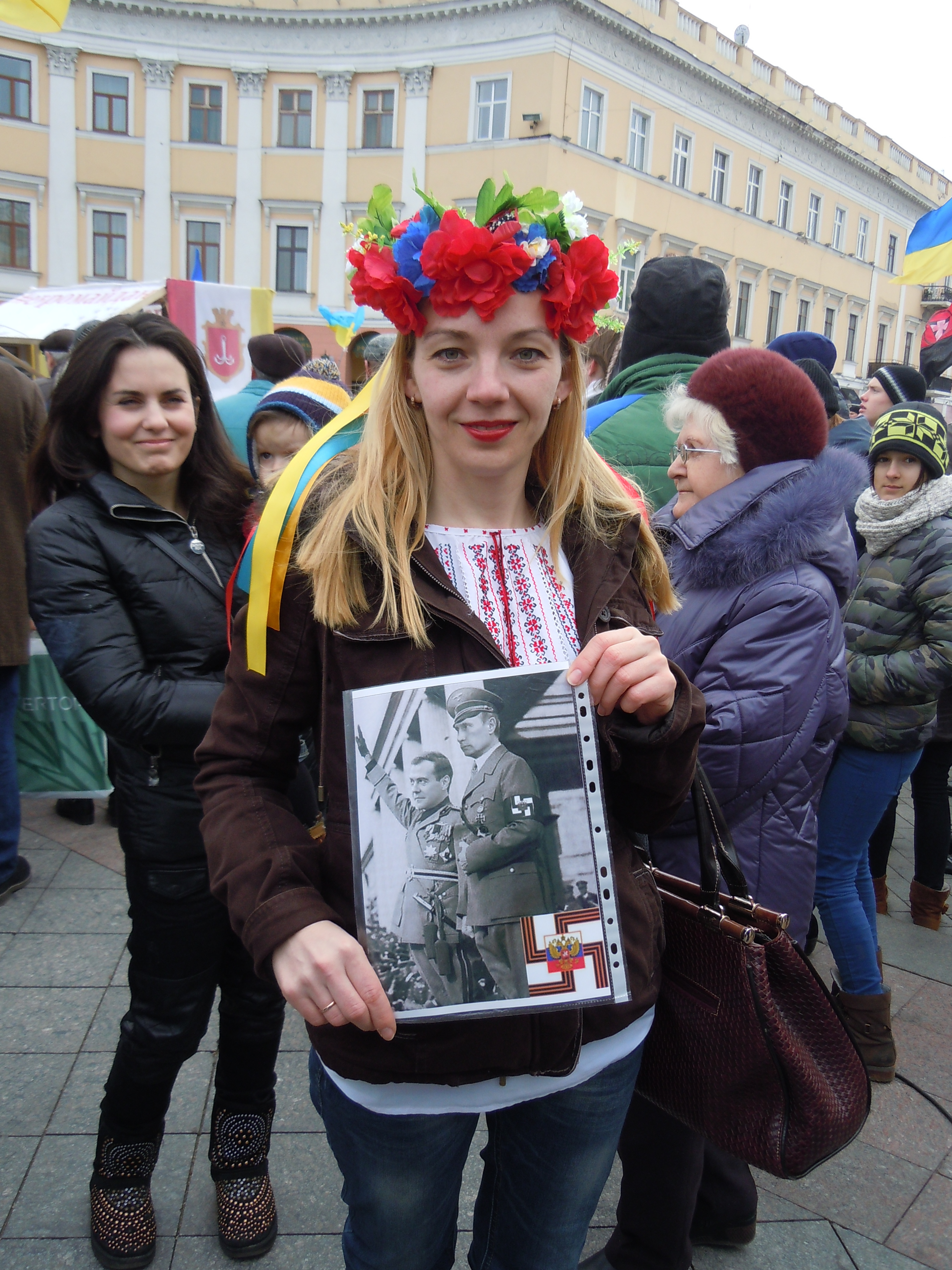
Protester against the Russian government holding an image portraying Dmitry Medvedev and Vladimir Putin as Nazis with a swastika made of colours of the Ribbon of Saint George and a Russian coat of arms in the centre, Odesa, 2014

During the Russian invasion of Ukraine, Dmitry Medvedev, deputy chairman of the Security Council of Russia and former Russian president, emerged as a leading exponent of radical imperial and anti-Ukrainian rhetoric. Medvedev has repeatedly denied Ukrainian sovereignty, writing that Ukraine is "not a country, but artificially collected territories" and describing Ukrainian as a "mongrel dialect" rather than a legitimate language. He stated that Russia would permanently wage war against any independent Ukrainian state, and framed the choice for Ukrainians as integration into Russia or "death".

Medvedev's statements have also incorporated religious and expansionist themes, describing the invasion as a "sacred battle against Satan" and explicitly asserting claims over major Ukrainian cities such as Kyiv and Odesa. In 2023, he suggested the potential annexation of the breakaway Georgian territories of Abkhazia and South Ossetia. In March 2024, at the World Festival of Youth in Sochi, Medvedev delivered a presentation declaring that "Ukraine is, of course, Russia" in front of a map depicting the vast majority of Ukrainian territory absorbed into the Russian Federation.

== Views on development of Ruscism ==
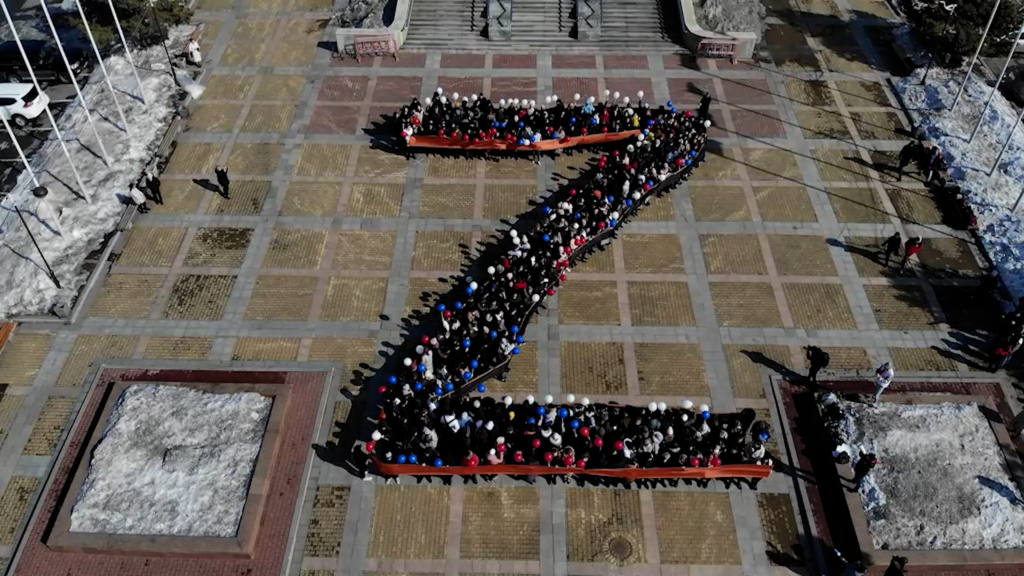
Flash mob at the Platinum Arena in Khabarovsk on 11 March 2022, organized by the Central District Management Committee and the United Russia party as part of the "We don't abandon our own" (Russian: Своих не бросаем) campaign. Attendees arrange themselves in "Z" symbol formation.

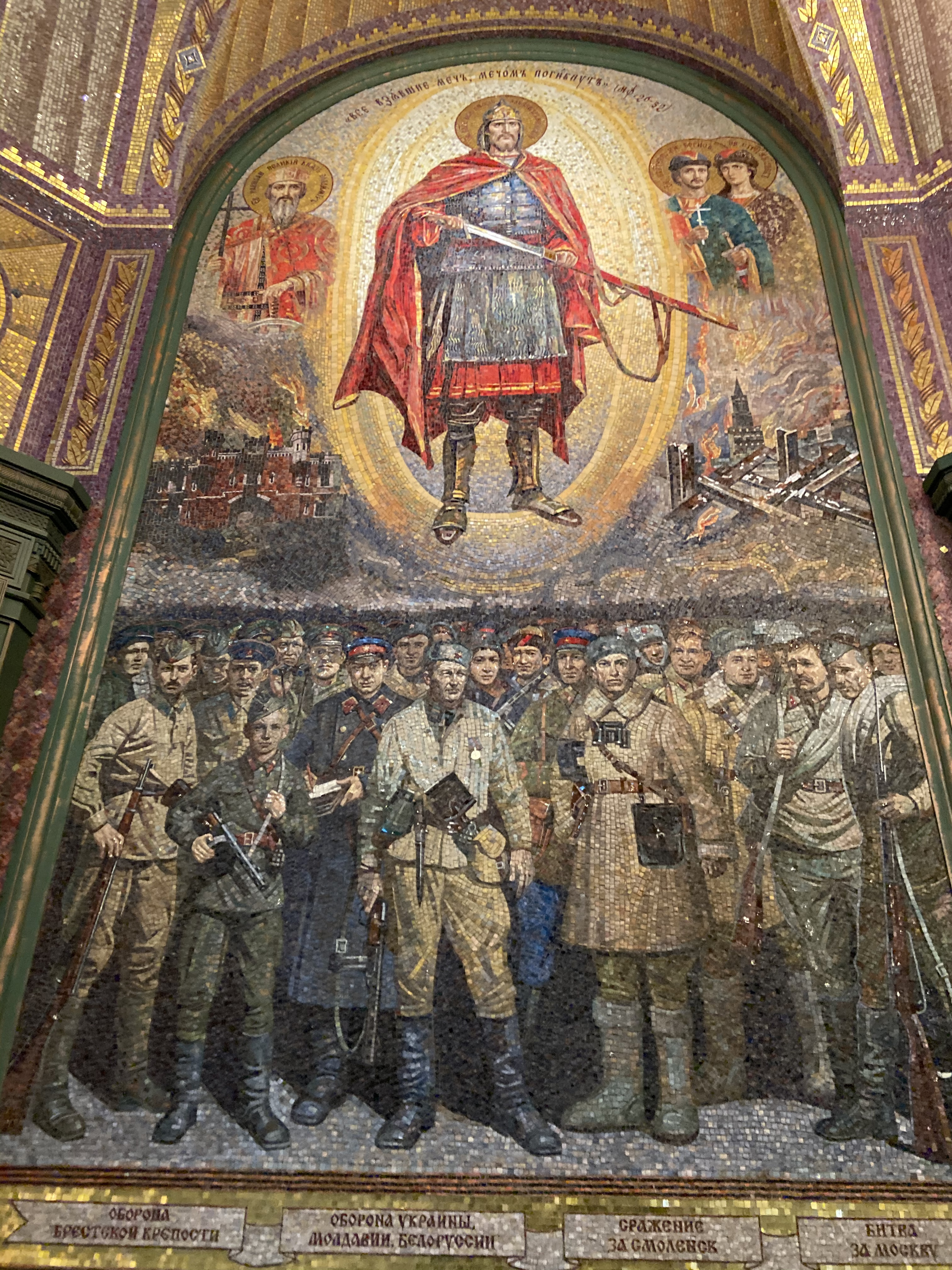
A mosaic in the Main Cathedral of the Russian Armed Forces blending Eastern Orthodox iconography with socialist realist art styles

According to The Economist, as a political calculation in response to waning domestic popularity in the early 2010s, Vladimir Putin began to draw heavily on post-Soviet fascist concepts that emerged after the Soviet collapse. Literary scholar Mark Lipovetsky argues that Ruscism has since evolved into "the cultural mainstream of Putinist Russia". Warnings regarding this ideological trajectory had been raised earlier: in 2007, former Russian prime minister Yegor Gaidar cautioned against rising post-imperial nostalgia, drawing historical parallels to Weimar Germany prior to Adolf Hitler's rise to power. Following the 2014 annexation of Crimea, opposition leader Boris Nemtsov and Soviet reform architect Alexander Yakovlev both warned that state propaganda and institutionalized criminality were driving Russia toward fascism. Historian Larysa Yakubova traces the rapid formation of Ruscism to an unexamined Soviet totalitarian legacy and a lack of systematic decommunization, while Yale historian Odd Arne Westad notes that the Kremlin's rhetoric regarding Ukraine mirrors late 19th-century imperial and racial colonial justifications.

Following the 2022 full-scale invasion, a broad range of political scientists and philosophers argued that modern Russia embodies a distinct form of fascism. Academician Vladislav Inozemtsev, scholar Tomasz Kamusella, and philosopher Slavoj Žižek have characterized the regime as neo-fascist, emphasizing its revanchist territorial expansion, hypernationalism, and subordination of civil society. Political scientist Francis Fukuyama noted structural resemblances to Nazi Germany, though characterized Putin's system as less institutionalized and personalized around a single leader. Historian Timothy D. Snyder and philosopher Mikhail Epstein have utilized the framework of schizo-fascism, describing a contradictory system where a fascist state defines itself primarily through "anti-fascist" rhetoric and uses such framing to justify religiously sanctified conquest and eliminationist policies.

From an institutional and economic perspective, historian Niall Ferguson has described the regime's ideology as a toxic blend of extreme nationalism, orthodoxy, and imperial nostalgia, while economist John H. Cochrane identified a classical fascist economic model in Russia, wherein nominally private industry is controlled by oligarchic monopolies that exchange wealth for state patronage and political compliance. Political scientist Maria Snegovaya argues that several features of Putin's Russia mirror Weimar and Nazi Germany, pointing to historical revanchism, hypermasculine authority ("the macho cult of Putin"), and a post-Soviet "Weimar syndrome" rooted in a perceived loss of status. She distinguishes the regime from classical 20th-century fascism, saying that modern Russian society relies on passive obedience and atomization rather than active mass mobilization. (Note: In her 2017 essay "Why Putin Is Almost a Fascist", Snegovaya argued that while the regime meets many criteria of fascism, Russian society is characterized by passive acceptance and atomization rather than the active mass mobilization of classical 20th-century fascism.)

=== Characteristics ===
In 2017, Yuliia Strebkova of Igor Sikorsky Kyiv Polytechnic Institute indicated that Ruscism in combination with Ukrainophobia constitutes the ethno-national vector of the broader Russian neo-imperial ideological doctrine of the "Russian world".

In 2018, Borys Demyanenko in his paper "Ruscism as a quasi-ideology of the post-Soviet imperial revenge" defined Ruscism as an eclectic mixture of imperial neocolonialism, great-power chauvinism, nostalgia for the Soviet Union, and religious traditionalism. Demyanenko considers that in internal policy, Ruscism manifests itself in human rights violations, persecution of dissidents, and ignoring of democratic procedures, while in foreign policy it manifests in violations of international law and justification of occupations.

Political scientist Stanislav Belkovsky argues that Ruscism is disguised as anti-fascism, but has a fascist essence. Political scientist Ruslan Kliuchnyk notes that the Russian elite considers itself entitled to build its own "sovereign democracy" without reference to Western standards. Russian political scientist Andrey Piontkovsky argues that the ideology of Ruscism is in many ways similar to Nazism, with the speeches of Vladimir Putin reflecting similar ideas to those of Adolf Hitler.

According to Alexander J. Motyl, Russian fascism has the following characteristics:

- An undemocratic political system, different from both traditional authoritarianism and totalitarianism;
- Statism and hypernationalism;
- A hypermasculine cult of the supreme leader;
- General popular support for the regime and its leader.

According to Professor Oleksandr Kostenko, Ruscism is an ideology that is "based on illusions and justifies the admissibility of any arbitrariness for the sake of misinterpreted interests of Russian society. In foreign policy, Ruscism manifests itself, in particular, in violation of the principles of international law, imposing its version of historical truth on the world solely in favor of Russia, abusing the right of veto in the UN Security Council, and so on. In domestic politics, Ruscism is a violation of human rights to freedom of thought, persecution of members of the 'dissent movement', the use of the media to misinform their people, and so on." Kostenko also considers Ruscism a manifestation of sociopathy.

Timothy D. Snyder argued in an essay that a "time traveler from the 1930s" would "have no difficulty" identifying the Russian regime in 2022 as fascist, writing:

The symbol Z, the rallies, the propaganda, the war as a cleansing act of violence and the death pits around Ukrainian towns make it all very plain. The war against Ukraine is not only a return to the traditional fascist battleground, but also a return to traditional fascist language and practice. Other people are there to be colonized. Russia is innocent because of its ancient past. The existence of Ukraine is an international conspiracy. War is the answer.

Boris Kagarlitsky describes the regime as "Post-Fascism", a logical outcome of neoliberalism and postmodernism lacking the workable totalitarian industrial machine of 20th-century fascism.

Ilya Budraitskis cites the definition of "post-fascism" by Enzo Traverso, arguing that modern Russian fascism is a move made from above that does not need mass movements, but rather relies on passive obedience.

Russian sociologist Grigory Yudin emphasized the importance of social atomization and depoliticisation of Russian society. According to him, historical fascist regimes also atomized societies to mobilize them.

Tomasz Kamusella highlights the role of the Russian language in Ruscism when the government of Russia claims that all Russian speakers must be "protected" by expanding Russia's territorial borders until they fully overlap with this perceived "Russian world" or Greater Russia. Simultaneously, the existence of Russian-speaking communities in countries such as Belarus and Ukraine has been used to claim that Belarus and Ukraine are "pseudo-states", because Belarusian and Ukrainian are not "real languages". According to Kamusella, ethnolinguistic nationalism officially became part of the Russian government's ideology in 2007 with the creation of the Russkiy Mir Foundation, while the weaponization of Russian language and culture and transition of it from an element of soft power to hard power took place after the 2014 annexation of Crimea. Latvian legal scholar Kristine Jarinovska described constitutional amendment initiatives to introduce Russian as a second official language in Latvia as a potentially effective tool for the "destruction of the nation-state", due to the impact such an amendment would have on Latvia's human rights and general principles of law, creating an obligation for hundreds of thousands of Latvian students to learn Russian despite a minority of students voluntarily choosing to learn Russian as a foreign language.

== Reactions in Russia ==
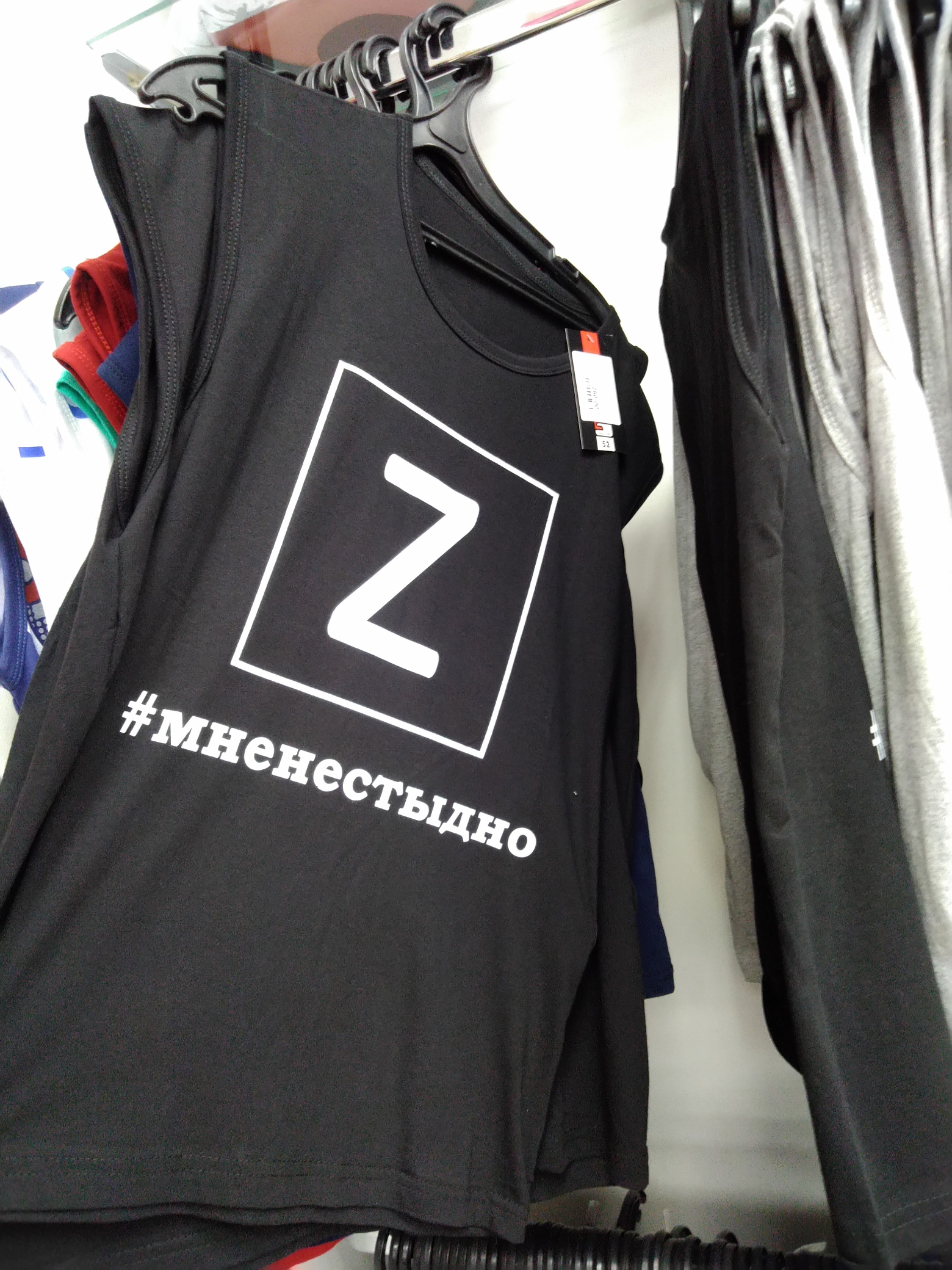
A shirt with a Z-shaped symbol that reads "I'm not ashamed" (Russian: #мненестыдно, romanized: #mnenestydno)

In 2014, Russian actor Ivan Okhlobystin, who holds pro-Putin views, publicly called himself a "Rashist" and got a tattoo "as a sign that I'm a Rashist, I'll live as a Rashist and I'll die as a Rashist". In 2015, he released a series of wristwatches with Chi Rho and the text "I am Rashist" (Russian: я рашист, romanized: ya rashist) on the clock face, written with a Gothic font, and with "Not only Crimea's ours – everything's ours!" on the back. The term was also embraced by Russian nationalist Yegor Kholmogorov who published an article titled "Russism. Choosing Putin", in which he broke down Russism into three components: "Russia is above all. Russia is a state of Russians. The Lord is with Russia and the Russians".

In 2015, Russian journalist Andrei Malgin compared Putin's desire to restore a "lost" empire and his support for the church to the policies of Italian fascist leader Benito Mussolini.

Russian economist Yakov Mirkin said that the term "Rashizm" is incorrect because it equates the entire Russian nation with "the ideology that brings trouble". He noted that as Nazism has never been called "Germanism", Putin's ideology should not be termed "Rashizm".

Oleg Tinkov, a Russian entrepreneur, stated he hoped others would "follow my example and stop working for fascism" after renouncing his Russian citizenship following the 2022 invasion.

In 2023, Oleg Orlov, the chairman of the Board of Human Rights Center "Memorial", said that Russia under Putin had descended into fascism and that the army is committing "mass murder".

=== Russian government and state media reactions ===
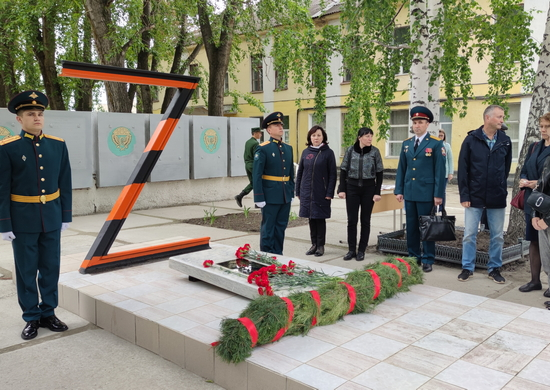
Monument in Yekaterinburg dedicated to the Z symbol.

Russian television presenter Tina Kandelaki, a supporter of Russia's war against Ukraine, criticized Wikipedia's use of the term "Rashizm" on her Telegram channel, accusing Wikipedia of "digital fascism" targeting Russian people and calling on Russians to stop using it.

Russia's federal censor Roskomnadzor reportedly ordered the English Wikipedia on 18 May 2022 to take down the articles "Rashism" and "2022 Russian invasion of Ukraine", asserting that they contain false information. After the Wikimedia Foundation refused to do so, a Moscow court imposed an $88,000 fine, a decision that the foundation has appealed.

On 20 May 2022, during the show Evening with Vladimir Solovyov, the host Vladimir Solovyov and his panelists responded with outrage to Timothy D. Snyder's article "We Should Say It. Russia Is Fascist", an article which according to Russian media watchdog Julia Davis has "spread through Russian state media like wildfire". Solovyov attacked Snyder by calling him a "pseudo-professor of a pseudo-university" and "simply a liar", and, addressing Americans, stated: "Let me tell you a secret: first of all, your signs are idiotic in their nature. Secondly, looking at your listed indications, how are they any different from the election campaign of Donald Trump?"

== Criticism of the term ==
Historian Stanley G. Payne said that Putin's Russia "is not equivalent to the fascist regimes of World War II, but it forms the nearest analogue to fascism found in a major country since that time" and "it is not the product of any revolutionary movement or ideology—fascist or otherwise. It has developed the characteristics of what some political analysts have called a 'mafia state,' though under centralized personal dictatorship." He believes that the political system in Russia is "more a revival of the creed of Tsar Nicholas I in the 19th century that emphasized 'Orthodoxy, autocracy, and nationality' than one resembling the revolutionary, modernizing regimes of Hitler and Mussolini."

Historian Roger Griffin notes that unlike fascist dictators who gave themselves absolute dictatorial authority, Putin prefers to manipulate "the trappings of the proto-democratic system", pretending to "defend and guarantee the Russian Constitution" and making amendments to it instead of completely rejecting it. Griffin compares Russia to militarist Japan, which he says "emulated fascism in many ways, but was not fascist".

== See also ==
- Chekism
- Comparison of Nazism and Stalinism
- Eurasianism
- National Bolshevism
- Nashism
- Pobedobesie
- Putler
- Red fascism
- Social fascism
- Vatnik (slang)
