= MEMRI =

Media research and translation nonprofit

Middle East Media and Research Institute
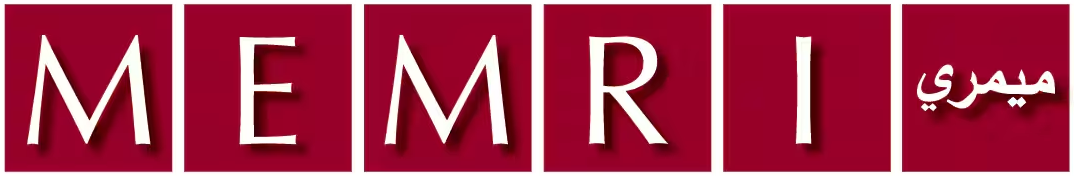
- Abbreviation: MEMRI
- Founded: 1998; 28 years ago
- Type: 501(c)(3)
- Tax ID no.: 52-2068483
- Legal status: Think tank (non-profit)
- Purpose: Media monitoring
- Headquarters: Washington, D.C., United States
- Region served: Worldwide
- Product: Media research, English-language translation, original analysis
- Official language: English
- President: Yigal Carmon
- Vice president: Alberto M. Fernandez
- Executive director: Steven Stalinsky
- Senior analyst: Nimrod Raphaeli
- Board of directors: Oliver Revell; Michael Mukasey; Robert R. Reilly; Jeffrey Kaufman; Yigal Carmon; Alberto Fernandez; Steven Stalinsky; Anna Mahjar-Barducci
- Revenue: $9.24 million (2021)
- Expenses: $7.77 million (2021)
- Website: www.memri.org

The Middle East Media and Research Institute (MEMRI) is an American non-profit organization specialized in Arabic and Muslim media monitoring. It focuses on extremist comments by Arab and Iranian leaders and communications from terrorist groups.

MEMRI was co-founded by Israeli ex-intelligence officer Yigal Carmon and Israeli-American political scientist Meyrav Wurmser in 1998. MEMRI describes itself as being independent and non-partisan. Some critics have described MEMRI as aiming to portray the Arab world and the Islamic world in a negative light by producing and disseminating incomplete or inaccurate translations of the original versions of the media reports that it republishes.

== Overview ==
Logo as of 2001

The organization indirectly gained public prominence as a source of news and analysis about the Muslim world following the September 11 attacks and the subsequent war on terror by the Bush administration. According to MEMRI, its translations and reports are distributed to "congresspersons, congressional staff, policy makers, journalists, academics, and interested parties". According to Political Research Associates, MEMRI's translated articles and its commentary are routinely cited in national media outlets in the United States, including The New York Times, The Washington Post, and Los Angeles Times, while analyses by MEMRI staff and officers are frequently published by conservative media outlets such as National Review, Fox News, Commentary, and the Weekly Standard. Political Research Associates wrote that both critics and supporters of MEMRI note its increasing influence in shaping perceptions of the Middle East. It has maintained longstanding relations with law enforcement agencies.

In 2012, Haaretz reported that Israeli intelligence agencies have reduced their monitoring of the Palestinian media with MEMRI and Palestinian Media Watch (PMW) now providing the Israeli government with coverage of "anti-Israel incitement" in social media, blogs and other online sources. The Prime Minister's Bureau has stated that before the government cites information provided by the two sources, the source of the material and its credibility is confirmed.

=== Projects ===
MEMRI's work is organized into projects, each with a specific focus. The main subjects the organization addresses are jihad and terrorism; relations between the U.S. and Middle East; pro-democracy and pro-civil rights views; inter-Arab relations; and antisemitism.

The Reform Project, according to MEMRI, focuses on monitoring, translating, and amplifying media from Muslim figures and movements with progressive viewpoints in the Arab and Muslim world. The project also aims to provide a platform for those sources to expand their reach. MEMRI has stated that this is the organization's flagship project.

The MEMRI Lantos Archives on antisemitism and Holocaust Denial, a joint project with the Lantos Foundation for Human Rights and Justice launched in 2009, is a repository of translated Arabic and Farsi material on antisemitism. The project is sponsored by the U.S. State Department. Through its translations and research, the project aims to document antisemitic trends in the Middle East and South Asia. The project provides policymakers with translations and footage of antisemitic comments made by media personalities, academics, and government and religious leaders. MEMRI holds an annual Capitol Hill gathering through the project, and publishes an annual report on antisemitism and Holocaust denial. The archives were named for Tom Lantos, the only Holocaust survivor to serve in United States Congress.

Arab and Iranian television programming is monitored, translated, and analyzed through the MEMRI TV Monitoring Project. The project's translated video clips are available to the media and general public.

Activity by terrorist and violent extremist organizations is tracked through the Jihad and Terrorism Threat Monitor (JTTM). The project disseminates jihadi-associated social media content and propaganda released by various Islamic State media companies.

The organization's Cyber and Jihad Lab (CJL) tracks cyberterrorism. According to MEMRI, the CJL's goal is to inform and make recommendations to legislators and the business community about the threat of cyberterrorism. Initiatives have included encouraging social media companies to remove terrorist accounts and sought legislation to prevent terrorist entities from using their platforms.

MEMRI's other projects include the Russian Media Studies Project, which translates Russian media and publishes reports analyzing Russian political ideology, the Iran Studies Project, the South Asia Studies Project, and the 9/11 Documentation Project.

== Funding ==
MEMRI is a 501(c)(3) non-profit organization. As of 2004, it had a policy of not accepting money from governments. MEMRI primarily relies on around 250 private donors, including some foundations.

MediaTransparency, an organization that monitors the financial ties of conservative think tanks to conservative foundations in the United States, reported that for the years 1999 to 2004, MEMRI received $100,000 from The Lynde and Harry Bradley Foundation, Inc., $100,000 from The Randolph Foundation, and $5,000 from the John M. Olin Foundation.

In August 2011, the United States Department of State's Office of International Religious Freedom in the Bureau of Democracy, Human Rights and Labor, awarded MEMRI a $200,000 grant.

== Reception ==
The organization's translations are regularly quoted by major international newspapers, and its work has generated strong criticism and praise. Critics have accused MEMRI of producing inaccurate, unreliable translations with undue emphasis and selectivity in translating and disseminating the most extreme views from Arabic and Persian media, which portray the Arab and Muslim world in a negative light, while ignoring moderate views that are often found in the same media outlets. Other critics charge that while MEMRI does sometimes translate pro-US or pro-democracy voices in the regional media, it systematically leaves out intelligent criticism of Western-style democracy, US and Israeli policy and secularism.

In 2006, MEMRI released an interview with Norman Finkelstein on Lebanese Al Jadeed in which he discussed his book The Holocaust Industry which made it appear as if Finkelstein was questioning the death toll of the Holocaust. Finkelstein said in response that MEMRI edited the television interview he gave in order to falsely impute that he was a Holocaust denier. In an interview with the Muslim-American newspaper In Focus in 2007, he said MEMRI uses "the same sort of ... techniques as the Nazis" and "take[s] things out of context in order to do personal and political harm to people they don't like".

Juan Cole, a professor of modern Middle East history at the University of Michigan, argues MEMRI has a tendency to "cleverly cherry-pick the vast Arabic press, which serves 300 million people, for the most extreme and objectionable articles and editorials. ... On more than one occasion I have seen, say, a bigoted Arabic article translated by MEMRI and when I went to the source on the web, found that it was on the same op-ed page with other, moderate articles arguing for tolerance. These latter were not translated." Former head of the CIA's counterintelligence unit, Vincent Cannistraro, said that MEMRI "are selective...for their political point of view, which is the extreme-right of Likud. They simply don't present the whole picture." Laila Lalami, writing in The Nation, states that MEMRI "consistently picks the most violent, hateful rubbish it can find, translates it and distributes it in email newsletters to media and members of Congress in Washington." As a result, critics such as UK Labour politician Ken Livingstone state that MEMRI's analyses are distortion.

MEMRI argues that they are quoting the government-controlled press and not obscure or extremist publications, a fact their critics acknowledge, according to Marc Perelman: "When we quote Al-Ahram in Egypt, it is as if we were quoting The New York Times. We know there are people questioning our work, probably those who have difficulties seeing the truth. But no one can show anything wrong about our translations."

=== Translation accuracy ===
Arabic speakers have highlighted substantial distortions in some of MEMRI's translations; in response MEMRI has stated, "[we have] never claimed to 'represent the view of the Arabic media', but rather to reflect, through our translations, general trends which are widespread and topical."

Syrian sociologist and novelist Halim Barakat claimed an essay he wrote for the Al-Hayat Daily of London titled "The Wild Beast that Zionism Created: Self-Destruction", was mistranslated by MEMRI and retitled as "Jews Have Lost Their Humanity". Barakat further stated "Every time I wrote 'Zionism', MEMRI replaced the word by 'Jew' or 'Judaism'. They want to give the impression that I'm not criticizing Israeli policy, but that what I'm saying is anti-Semitic." According to Barakat, he was subject to widespread condemnation from faculty and his office was "flooded with hatemail". Fellow Georgetown faculty member Aviel Roshwald accused Barakat in an article he published of promoting a "demonization of Israel and of Jews". Supported by Georgetown colleagues, Barakat denied the claim, which Roshwald had based on MEMRI's translation of Barakat's essay.

In an email debate with Yigal Carmon, Brian Whitaker asked about MEMRI's November 2000 translation of an interview given by the Grand Mufti of Jerusalem to Al-Ahram al-Arabi. One question asked by the interviewer was: "How do you deal with the Jews who are besieging al-Aqsa and are scattered around it?" which was translated as: "How do you feel about the Jews?" MEMRI cut out the first part of the reply and combined it with the answer to the next question, which, Whitaker claimed, made "Arabs look more anti-Semitic than they are". Carmon admitted this was an error in translation but defended combining the two replies, as both questions referred to the same subject. Carmon rejected other claims of distortion by Whitaker, saying: "it is perhaps reassuring that you had to go back so far to find a mistake ... You accused us of distortion by omission but when asked to provide examples of trends and views we have missed, you have failed to answer." Carmon also accused Whitaker of "using insults rather than evidence" in his criticism of MEMRI.

=== Positive reception ===
In 2003 John Lloyd defended MEMRI in the New Statesman:

One beneficial side effect of the focus on the Middle East is that we now have available much more information on the discourse of the Arab world. The most powerful medium for this is (naturally) a Washington-based think-tank, the Middle East Media Research Institute (MEMRI), started in 1998 by the former Israeli intelligence officer and Arabist Yigal Carmon. MEMRI aimed to bring the previously largely enclosed and unknown Arab talk about the west to western eyes and ears: it is a sobering experience to read on the internet MEMRI's vast store of translations from many media, and to note how much of what is written is conspiratorial, vicious and unyieldingly hateful. MEMRI and Carmon have been accused of selecting the worst of a diverse media: however, the sheer range of what is available weakens that criticism, as does support for the initiative by Arab liberals.

In a 2005 piece Thomas Friedman, a political opinion columnist for The New York Times, praised MEMRI, and credited MEMRI with helping to "shine a spotlight on hate speech wherever it appears". Friedman has written in The New York Times that "what I respect about MEMRI is that it translates not only the ugly stuff but the courageous liberal, reformist Arab commentators as well." In addition, he has cited MEMRI's translations in his op-eds.

In 2002 Brit Hume of Fox News said, "These people tell you what's going on in pulpits and in the state-controlled TV. If you have indoctrination, it's important to know about it."

Jay Nordlinger, the managing editor of National Review, wrote in 2002:

Wading or clicking through MEMRI's materials can be a depressing act, but it is also illusion-dispelling, and therefore constructive. This one institute is worth a hundred reality-twisting Middle Eastern Studies departments in the U.S. Furthermore, listening to Arabs—reading what they say in their newspapers, hearing what they say on television—is a way of taking them seriously: a way of not condescending to them, of admitting that they have useful things to tell us, one way or the other. Years ago, Solzhenitsyn exhorted, "Live not by lies." We might say, in these new circumstances, "Live not by ignorance about lies, either." Anyone still has the right to avert his eyes, of course. But no one can say that that is not a choice.

== See also ==
- Hasbara
- Media coverage of the Arab–Israeli conflict
- Palestinian Media Watch
- Russian Media Monitor, a similar project.

== Bibliography ==
- Baker, Mona (December 3, 2010). "Narratives of terrorism and security: 'accurate' translations, suspicious frames". Critical Studies on Terrorism. 3 (3): 347–364. doi:10.1080/17539153.2010.521639. ISSN 1753-9161. S2CID 144273369.
- Curtiss, Richard H. (April 2007). "Meyrav Wurmser: The Neocons' Den Mother". Washington Report on Middle East Affairs. Vol. 26, no. 3. p. 17.
- Fathi, Schirin (2010). "Memri.org – A Tool of Enlightenment or Incitement?". In Graf, Arndt; Fathi, Schirin; Paul, Ludwig (eds.). Orientalism and Conspiracy: Politics and Conspiracy Theory in the Islamic World. I.B.Tauris. pp. 165–180. doi:10.5040/9780755610969. ISBN 978-0-85773-183-8.
- Hudson, Leila (Winter 2005). "The New Ivory Towers: Think Tanks, Strategic Studies and 'Counterrealism". Middle East Policy. 12 (4): 118–132. doi:10.1111/j.1475-4967.2005.00229.x.
- Lasson, Kenneth (2016). "Holocaust Denial in North America". In Baum, Steven K.; Kressel, Neil J.; Cohen, Florette; Jacobs, Steven Leonard (eds.). Antisemitism in North America: New World, Old Hate. Brill. pp. 301–347. doi:10.1163/9789004307148. ISBN 978-90-04-30714-8.
