= Raffi Khatchadourian =

American journalist

- Born: Long Island, New York, U.S.
- Education: Trinity College; Columbia University
- Occupation: Journalist
- Known for: Investigating topics related to WikiLeaks, the Iraq War, Tiversa, U.S. military experimenting and genocide

Raffi Khatchadourian is an American journalist. He is well known for his investigative pieces on an array of topics such as WikiLeaks, the Iraq War, Tiversa, U.S. military experimenting, and genocide. His long-form piece "Azzam the American," which appeared in The New Yorker, is one of his most notable works. It was published on January 22, 2007, and was nominated for a National Magazine Award in Profile Writing.

== Early life and education ==
Khatchadourian was born in Long Island, New York. He earned a Bachelor of Arts degree from Trinity College in Hartford, Connecticut. He also earned an International Relations master's degree from Columbia University.

== Career ==
Khatchadourian began his journalism career in Moscow, where he worked at an English weekly called The Russia Journal. While there, he worked as the chief copy editor and wrote news and editorial articles.

He has contributed freelance work to a number of publications after returning from Moscow, including The Nation, the San Francisco Chronicle, The Baltimore Sun, Condé Nast Traveler, Smithsonian magazine and Salon. Khatchadourian spent time in Uzbekistan, Kyrgyzstan and Tajikistan in 2001 in order to report on U.S. military involvement in Afghanistan for The Nation and the San Francisco Chronicle.

In 2003, prior to joining the staff at The New Yorker, Khatchadourian wrote a five-segment piece for The Village Voice on the construction of an oil pipeline through Azerbaijan, Georgia and Turkey.

Khatchadourian was a fellow at the International Reporting Project (IRP) in 2005. The project, which is run by the Paul H. Nitze School of Advanced International Studies (SAIS) at Johns Hopkins University in Washington, D.C., "provides opportunities for journalists to report internationally on critical issues that are under covered in the news media."

=== The New Yorker ===
Khatchadourian began working for The New Yorker in 2003 as a staff fact-checker. He wrote his first piece for the magazine, "Azzam the American," in 2007 and transitioned to a staff writer in 2008. Since then, Khatchadourian has written a number of investigative pieces for The New Yorker on a range of topics.

==== "Azzam the American" ====
"Azzam the American" is the first piece Khatchadourian wrote for The New Yorker, the year before becoming a staff writer for the magazine. The piece was nominated for the Profile Writing category of the National Magazine Awards. It investigated the story of Adam Gadahn, Oregon-born U.S. citizen who joined Al-Qaeda. Gadahn became an English spokesperson for Al-Qaeda's media, serving as "translator, video producer and cultural interpreter," Khatchadourian reported.

Although Khatchadourian did not speak with Gadahn himself, he offered an in-depth profile using a number of sources. He spoke to terrorism experts such as Randy Parsons, who was in charge of the Los Angeles F.B.I.'s counterterroism division from 2002 to 2006. The article also cited people who knew Gadahn's family. Most importantly, though, Khatchadourian scoured through essays, videos and audio recordings Gadahn had made in order to learn more about him.

==== "No Secrets" ====
In 2010, Khatchadourian wrote "No Secrets" for The New Yorker. The investigative article profiled Julian Assange, the founder of WikiLeaks. In the piece, Khatchadourian wrote that Assange wanted to be as transparent as possible concerning his work at WikiLeaks. He captured this as he told Assange's story, from starting WikiLeaks to keeping an eye out for the next leak.

Khatchadourian spent time with Assange, and his team at the time, in Iceland. They were working on a leak, code named Project B, regarding two U.S. airstrikes in Baghdad, which took place on July 12, 2007. The video revealed that, along with the intended targets, the airstrike killed Saeed Chmagh and Namir Noor-Eldeen, two war correspondents for Reuters. The leak was given the title Collateral Murder upon release.

Assange also revealed his own personal story to Khathcadourian. At the age of 16 he began hacking under the name Mendax, with a group called the International Subversives. Khatchadourian also reported, from a meeting with the WikiLeaks founder on a bench in Bryant Park after the release of Collateral Murder, that Assange was working on a new project: Project G.

==== Operation Delirium ====
Another of Khatchadourian's investigative pieces for The New Yorker, titled "Operation Delirium," shed light on U.S. military experimenting during the Cold War. The article, written in 2012, focused on Colonel James S. Ketchum, and his involvement with the Edgewood Arsenal human experiments. Khatchadourian unveiled the extent to which a vast assortment of different chemicals were being tested on, often unknowing, U.S. soldiers. The experiments were executed in an effort to create a viable form of psychochemical warfare.

Ketchum told Khatchadourian about the experiments that took place at Edgewood. Soldiers were given drugs without any preparation or knowledge of what they were taking; they were studied, and then released without counselling or warning of potential effects. Ketchum also told Khatchadourian of an experimenter at Edgewood Arsenal by the name of Dr. Van Murray Sim. Sim believed that the type of psychochemical testing they were involved in required subjects not to have any preconceived expectations. He often gave unwitting people, including high-ranking officers, LSD, without informed consent. Despite disagreeing with Sim's methods, and struggling with his own conscience, Khatchadourian reported that Ketchum defended his work at Edgewood.

== Bibliography ==
- "Azzam the American". A Reporter at Large. The New Yorker. January 22, 2007.
- "Bus ride : a bus ride to the anti-war protest on the Pentagon". Hell No Dept. The New Yorker. April 2, 2007.
- "Neptune's navy : Paul Watson's wild crusade to save the oceans". A Reporter at Large. The New Yorker. November 5, 2007.
- "Dem delegates". Bronx Cheers. The New Yorker. September 15, 2008.
- "The Kill Company : did a colonel's fiery rhetoric set the conditions for a massacre?". The New Yorker. July 6–13, 2009.
- "The Gulf war : were there any heroes in the BP oil disaster?". The New Yorker. March 14, 2011.
- "Transfiguration : how Dallas Wiens found a new face". The New Yorker. February 13–20, 2012.
- "The chaos of the dice : a backgammon hustler's quest to gain an edge". Profiles. The New Yorker. 89 (13): 34–39. May 13, 2013. (Note: Discusses Matvey Natanzon, aka Falafel.)
- "A star in a bottle : an audacious plan to create a new energy source could save the planet from catastrophe. But time is running out". A Reporter at Large. The New Yorker. 90 (2): 42–59. March 3, 2014.
- "A century of silence : a family survives the Armenian genocide and its long aftermath". The New Yorker. January 5, 2015.
- "The doomsday invention : will artificial intelligence bring us utopia or destruction?". A Reporter at Large. The New Yorker. 91 (37): 64–79. November 23, 2015.
- "The unseen : millions of microbes are yet to be discovered. Will one hold the ultimate cure?". Annals of Science. The New Yorker. 92 (18): 50–59. June 20, 2016.
- "The long view : Edward Burtynsky's quest to photograph a changing planet". Our Far-Flung Correspondents. The New Yorker. 92 (42): 80–95. December 19–26, 2016.
- "Alternate endings : movies that allow you to decide what happens next". Annals of Technology. The New Yorker. 92 (47): 46–55. January 30, 2017. (Note: Online version is titled "The movie with a thousand plotlines".)
- "Man without a country : Julian Assange, WikiLeaks, and the 2016 Presidential election". Profiles. The New Yorker. 93 (24): 36–61. August 21, 2017. (Note: Online version is titled "Julian Assange, a man without a country".)
- "Dream worlds". Profiles. The New Yorker. 95 (46): unknown. January 20, 2020. (Note: Online version is titled "N.K. Jemisin's Dream Worlds".)
- "End-times". The Talk of the Town. Reclamation Dept. The New Yorker. 96 (15): 13–14. June 1, 2020. (Note: Online version is titled "Alan Weisman’s thought experiment becomes a reality".)
- "The Trash Nebula : millions of man-made artifacts are circling Earth. Will one of them cause a disaster?". Onward and Upward with the Sciences. The New Yorker. 96 (29): 44–52, 54–55. September 28, 2020. (Note: Online version is titled "The elusive peril of space junk".)
- "Ghost walls". A Reporter at Large. The New Yorker. 97 (8): 30–51. April 12, 2021. (Note: Online version is titled "Surviving the Crackdown in Xinjiang".)
- "Light and shadow : Matthew Wong's art conveys a life of extraordinary pain and self-determination". Profiles. The New Yorker. 98 (12): 34–47. May 16, 2022. (Note: Online version is titled "Matthew Wong's life in light and shadow".)

Series on the Baku-Tbilisi-Ceyhan (BTC) Pipeline Project

- "Part One: Crude measures". The Village Voice. February 11, 2003. Archived from the original on June 2, 2016.
- "Part Two: Code of the Kalashnikov". The Village Voice. February 18, 2003. Archived from the original on June 2, 2016.
- "Part Three: Disgust, distrust and death threats". The Village Voice. March 4, 2003. Archived from the original on June 2, 2016.
- "Part Four: America builds an army for industry". The Village Voice. March 25, 2003. Archived from the original on June 2, 2016.
- "The price of progress". The Village Voice. April 22, 2003. Archived from the original on June 2, 2016.

———————
