= Kroll Inc. =

American corporate investigations and risk consulting firm

Kroll, LLC
- Type: Limited liability company
- Industry: Corporate investigation Risk consulting Financial advisory
- Founded: 1932; 94 years ago (as Duff & Phelps)
- Headquarters: New York City, U.S.
- Number of locations: 72
- Area served: Worldwide
- Key people: Noah Gottdiener (executive chairman); Jacob Silverman (CEO)
- Number of employees: 6,500
- Website: www.kroll.com

Kroll (formerly Duff & Phelps) is an American multinational financial and risk advisory firm that has its headquarters in New York City. It was established in 1932 as Duff & Phelps. In 2018, Duff & Phelps acquired the original Kroll company, which had been founded in 1972. In 2021, Duff & Phelps decided to rebrand itself as Kroll, a process it completed in 2022.

== History ==
=== Duff & Phelps ===
Duff & Phelps was founded in 1932 by William Duff and George Phelps in Chicago to provide investment research. Since that time, the firm expanded into corporate finance and investment management, as well as credit rating. In 1979, Duff & Phelps expanded into investment management, creating what would become Duff & Phelps Investment Management Co. (DPIMC), which was spun off into its own company in 2009 and was no longer part of the main Duff & Phelps firm.

In 1984, the company was nearly acquired by Security Pacific Corp. in a $35 million transaction. However, the deal was called off in early 1985 by Security Pacific Corp. because of restraints put on the deal by the Federal Reserve Board, which would have precluded the company from issuing public credit ratings.

==== First leveraged buyout and return to public markets ====
The company was acquired five years later, in 1989, in a $146 million management buyout. The buyout was backed by Freeman, Spogli & Co., a private equity firm that controlled approximately two-thirds of the company, and management and employees owning the remaining third of the company's equity. The transaction was highly leveraged, financed with 79% bank borrowings and 15% coupon high-yield bonds. The company was taken public for the first time in 1992 through an initial public offering of stock on the New York Stock Exchange.

By the mid-1990s, Duff & Phelps, which was operating as a publicly traded company, began to focus on its core investment management, financial advisory and corporate finance operations. As a result, in October 1994, the Duff & Phelps's credit rating business, Duff & Phelps Credit Rating Co., was spun off to its shareholders and listed on the New York Stock Exchange. In 2000, Duff & Phelps Credit Rating Co. was acquired by Fitch Group, which later eliminated the use of the Duff & Phelps name.

==== Second leveraged buyout and return to public markets ====
In 2004, Lovell Minnick Partners sponsored a management buyout of the company, the second time the company had undergone a leveraged buyout transaction, acquiring the company from its then owner, Webster Financial Corporation. As part of the transaction, the company was merged with Stone Ridge Partners, a middle-market investment banking firm. In 2005, the company raised equity from Vestar Capital Partners to support the company's acquisition strategy that included the purchase of Standard & Poor's Corporate Value Consulting business as well as Valuemetrics, a financial advisory firm specializing in valuation services founded in 1981. In 2006, it acquired specialty restructuring firm Chanin Capital Partners, LLC.

In 2007, Duff & Phelps completed its second initial public offering raising $133 million and listing the company's shares on the New York Stock Exchange. The IPO provided a partial exit for its two private equity financial sponsors. Also in 2007, the firm formed a strategic alliance with Tokyo-based Shinsei Bank. The firm has continued its acquisition strategy acquiring Dubinsky & Co., a financial consulting company and Kane Reece Associates. In 2010, the firm acquired the consulting business of Dynamic Credit Partners, bringing specialized talent in complex fixed income securities analysis, valuation and litigation support.

==== Subsequent leveraged buyouts and private company history ====
After less than five years as a public company, Duff & Phelps again agreed to a take-private offer from private equity firms. On December 30, 2012, Duff & Phelps, announced that it had entered into an agreement to be acquired for approximately $665.5 million by a consortium, comprising controlled affiliates of or funds managed by The Carlyle Group, Stone Point Capital LLC, Pictet & Cie and Edmond de Rothschild Group.

In December 2015, Duff & Phelps announced that the University of California’s Office of the Chief Investment Officer would make a significant minority investment in the firm. As part of the transaction, The Carlyle Group and Duff & Phelps’ senior management group increased its investment. Stonepoint Capital LLC, Edmond de Rothschild Group and Pictet Group sold their equity interest in Duff & Phelps.

In November 2017, Permira, a global private equity firm, announced the acquisition of Duff & Phelps from The Carlyle Group, Neuberger Berman, the University of California’s Office of the Chief Investment Officer of the Regents and Pictet & Cie for $1.75 billion. The management team, led by CEO, Noah Gottdiener and President, Jacob Silverman, maintained a significant equity stake in the company and remained in their rolls.

In January 2020, Duff & Phelps announced it had agreed to be acquired by a global investor consortium led by funds managed by Stone Point Capital and Further Global at a valuation of $4.2 billion. Permira as well as the existing management team agreed to maintain a "a meaningful equity stake in the firm."

==== M&A History ====
In 2007, Duff & Phelps acquired Rash & Associates, a nationwide provider of property tax management services. In 2009, Duff & Phelps acquired Lumin Expert Group, a financial consulting firm specializing in intellectual property dispute support and expert testimony. In June 2010, Duff & Phelps announced it acquired Cole & Partners, a Toronto-based independent financial advisory practice. The acquisition established a Canadian presence for Duff & Phelps and enhanced the firm’s dispute consulting, valuation and corporate finance advisory services. In July 2011, Duff & Phelps announced it acquired Growth Capital Partners, a Texas-based investment banking firm focused on transactions in the middle market.

In July 2014, Duff & Phelps acquired the Restructuring and Insolvency Division of RSM Farrell Grant Sparks (“RSM FGS”), one of the largest dedicated restructuring and insolvency teams operating in the Republic of Ireland. The acquisition expanded Duff & Phelps’ Global Restructuring Advisory Practice to include more than 200 professionals across Europe, the U.S. and Canada. In 2015, Duff & Phelps made two significant acquisitions. The first was of Kinetic Partners, a UK-based financial regulatory consulting firm with 200 employees. As a result of this acquisition, Duff & Phelps launched its Financial Regulatory and Compliance practice. The second acquisition was of American Appraisal, a Milwaukee-based valuation company with nearly 1,000 employees globally. This acquisition broadened the type of valuation work Duff & Phelps did in the U.S., specifically in fixed asset management and insurance solutions (FAMIS). In addition to the new locations in the U.S., the acquisition established new locations for the firm in Europe and Asia. The American Appraisal acquisition also included the Real Estate Advisory Group (REAG) business.

In May 2016, Duff & Phelps acquired Corporate Finance Ireland (CFI), a leading corporate finance firm in the Republic of Ireland.

On June 4, 2018, Duff & Phelps purchased Kroll Inc. and it purchased Prime Clerk in 2019.

In February 2021, Duff & Phelps announced plans to unify the companies under the Kroll brand, which was completed in February 2022.

On March 25, 2021, Kroll announced that it had acquired Redscan, a UK based cyber security company. In March 2022, Kroll acquired Canadian risk intelligence software company Resolver.

=== Kroll brand history ===
The Kroll brand originated with a consultancy servicing corporate purchasing departments, which was founded by Jules Kroll in 1972. The firm began its line of work in financial sector investigations during the 1980s, when corporations approached Kroll to profile investors, suitors, and takeover targets.

In the 1990s, Kroll expanded into forensic accounting, background screening, drug testing, electronic data recovery (with the acquisition of Ontrack Data Recovery), and market intelligence.

In 1997, Kroll merged with vehicle armoring company O'Gara-Hess & Eisenhardt to form Kroll-O'Gara. The company became public and was listed on the NASDAQ as "KROG". In August 2001, the O’Gara vehicle armoring businesses were sold to Armor Holdings, and the company's name was changed to Kroll Inc. and its ticker symbol to "KROL".

In 2002, Kroll acquired restructuring firm Zolfo Cooper for $153 million. At the time, Zolfo Cooper was working on the Enron case.

In July 2004, Kroll was acquired by professional services firm Marsh & McLennan Companies in a $1.9-billion transaction.

In June 2008, Jules Kroll left Kroll Inc.

In August 2010, Kroll was acquired by Altegrity, Inc. in an all-cash transaction valued at $1.13 billion. Altegrity declared bankruptcy in 2015, and Kroll was later bought by Corporate Risk Holdings, LLC.

On October 21, 2016, Carlyle Group-owned KLDiscovery purchased Kroll Ontrack for around $410 million and operated it as a separate company. In 2018, Kroll acquired cybersecurity firm Tiversa.

=== Controversies ===
In 2004, Kroll was hired by Brasil Telecom to investigate Telecom Italia. The two Telecommunications giants had been in a legal dispute over the 2000 acquisition of the Brazilian fixed-line phone company Companhia Riograndense de Telecomunicoes ('CRT') from Spain's Telefónica. Kroll was hired to investigate Telecom Italia executives for information to be used in the litigation. However, reports from Kroll, published by Brazilian daily Folha showed that Kroll's investigation included government officials.

Brasil Telecom, the country's third largest fixed-line operator, and Opportunity, which controlled Brasil Telecom, hired Kroll to determine whether Telecom Italia competed with Brasil Telecom in 2000 in the latter's, as both Opportunity and Telecom Italia were struggling for the control of Brasil Telecom. Brasil Telecom and Telecom Italia have been locked in court struggles since 2000. Kroll was accused of spying on Brazilian government officials including a close adviser to President Lula da Silva and the head of the government run Banco do Brasil. In October 2004 Brazilian authorities raided Kroll's offices in São Paulo and arrested five people and seized papers, listening equipment and computers. The government accused Kroll of wiretapping, bribing officials, and illegally intercepting e-mails.

In August 2020, in the Court of Session, the Scottish Lord Advocate accepted that the prosecution of two Duff & Phelps administrators, Paul Clark and David Whitehouse, after the Rangers F.C. administration in 2012 had been "malicious" and without "probable cause". The court ordered the interim payment of £600,000 costs to the administrators. The administrators sought £20.8 million in damages from the Crown Office and Police Scotland.

== Services ==
Kroll provides risk, governance, transaction and valuation advisory.

=== Private intelligence ===
Kroll has been compared to a private intelligence agency (“CIA of Wall Street”) for its activities. The well-connected company founder Jules Kroll has hired numerous former CIA, FBI, Mossad, and MI5 employees. In 1996, The Washington Post reported that the Direction de la surveillance du territoire, a French intelligence agency, suspected that Kroll was sometimes used as a front for CIA activity.

=== Background screening ===
Kroll's background screening division provides screening services for areas such as employment, supplier selection, investment placement and institutional admissions. This division also includes the Kroll Fraud Solutions unit, which specializes in identity theft protection and identity restoration services.

=== Security consulting ===
Kroll offers consulting services through Kroll Security Group, its Security Consulting and Security Engineering & Design division.

In 2020, Kroll was hired by the Austin Police Department to evaluate the department's policies and protocols for racism and discrimination. They presented their findings to the Austin city council in March 2021.

=== Social media ===
Kroll's business and investigations practice provides background checks on Instagram influencers, using publicly-accessible online information to prevent them being 'cancelled' for problematic or potentially disreputable behaviour (e.g. tweets which includes offensive language or content).

=== Other work ===
An agreement between the government of Ghana and Kroll for the firm to retrieve assets and investigate wrongdoings by previous appointments was subject to two lawsuits in 2020, challenging the constitutionality of the agreement. Both lawsuits were dropped in April 2021.

Kroll was hired in 2018 by Michigan State University during the Larry Nassar case to investigate over 170 sexual assault cases at the university.

== Notable cases ==
=== The Heroin Trail case ===
In 1987, in the prominent First Amendment case over The Heroin Trail stories in New York Newsday, attorney Floyd Abrams enlisted Kroll's help to find an eyewitness: "But was it conceivable that we could come up with an eyewitness who could be of help? I called Jules Kroll, the CEO of Kroll Associates, the nation's most acclaimed investigative firm, to ask him if he could inquire, through the extensive range of former law enforcement officials employed by him, whether Karaduman was known to be a drug trafficker in Istanbul." Two weeks into the trial Kroll produced Faraculah Arras, who was prepared to testify he was involved in one of Karaduman's drug deals. "I was stunned," recalled Abrams.

Abrams used Kroll again in 1998 to investigate claims by CNN's Newsstand documentary that sarin nerve gas had been used in Vietnam in 1970 as part of Operation Tailwind.

=== The John Fredriksen oil theft case ===
Kroll assisted in the trial of Norwegian shipping tycoon John Fredriksen at the end of the 1980s.

=== Brazilian privatization ===
Fernando Henrique Cardoso, Daniel Dantas, the company in question, André Esteves, Roberto Mangabeira Unger and Dario Messer signed a schedule agreement to privatize Brazilian state-owned enterprises.

=== WTC and Sears Tower security ===
Kroll were responsible for revamping security at the World Trade Center after the 1993 World Trade Center bombing. They also took on responsibility for security at Chicago's Sears Tower following the September 11, 2001 attacks. Just prior to the September 11 attacks, Kroll Inc., under the guidance of Jerome Hauer, the managing director of their Crisis and Consulting Management Group, hired former FBI special investigator John P. O'Neill, who specialized in the Al-Qaeda network held responsible for the 1993 bombing, to head the security at the WTC complex. O'Neill died in the attacks.

=== Capital outflows from the Soviet Union and Russia ===
In March 1992, the Yeltsin government contracted Kroll to track down large sums of money removed from the Soviet Union prior to the 1991 Soviet coup d'état attempt. On March 15, 1992, following accusations from First Deputy Prime Minister Yegor Timurovich Gaidar of "large-scale privatization by the nomenklatura", the Russian government froze all capital outflows from Russia, and eventually, the assets of the Vnesheconombank.

Despite investigators stating they received very little support from Russian authorities, Kroll determined more than $14 billion (in 1991 real dollars) had been transferred from Switzerland to New York prior to the putsch (mostly in joint-stock companies, such as the Leningrad Association of Joint Ventures), and that another $40 billion plus (in 2014 dollars) had been transferred out of Russia by the Communist Party and other government agencies of the former Soviet Union, through hundreds of illicit transactions. This outflow of capital contributed to severe economic conditions in Russia during Boris Yeltsin’s second term.

=== 2014 Moldovan bank fraud scandal ===
On 28 January 2015, the National Bank of Moldova hired Kroll to present its findings from Project Tenor involving Ilan Shor's Shor Holding and the 2014 Moldovan bank fraud scandal which was part of the Russian Laundromat.

=== Harvey Weinstein ===
In 2015 Kroll was hired by Harvey Weinstein to wipe evidence of sexual abuse from the electronic devices of Ambra Gutierrez as part of a settlement he reached with her. Weinstein had frequent interactions with Kroll especially when trying to find discrediting information about potential critics and accusers.

== Sources ==
- Belton, Catherine (June 23, 2020). Putin's People: How the KGB Took Back Russia and Then Took on the West. New York: Farrar, Straus, Giroux. ISBN 978-0374238711.
- Meier, Barry (May 18, 2021). Spooked: The Trump Dossier, Black Cube, and the Rise of Private Spies. HarperCollins. ISBN 9780062950680.
