= Karaduman =

Karaduman is a Turkish surname. Notable people with the surname include:

- Burak Karaduman (born 1985), Turkish footballer
- Emrah Karaduman (born 1992), Turkish composer and arranger
- Mahmut Karaduman, Turkish national and the plaintiff in a famous libel case
