= 1992 Moscow peace parade =

Russian military parade

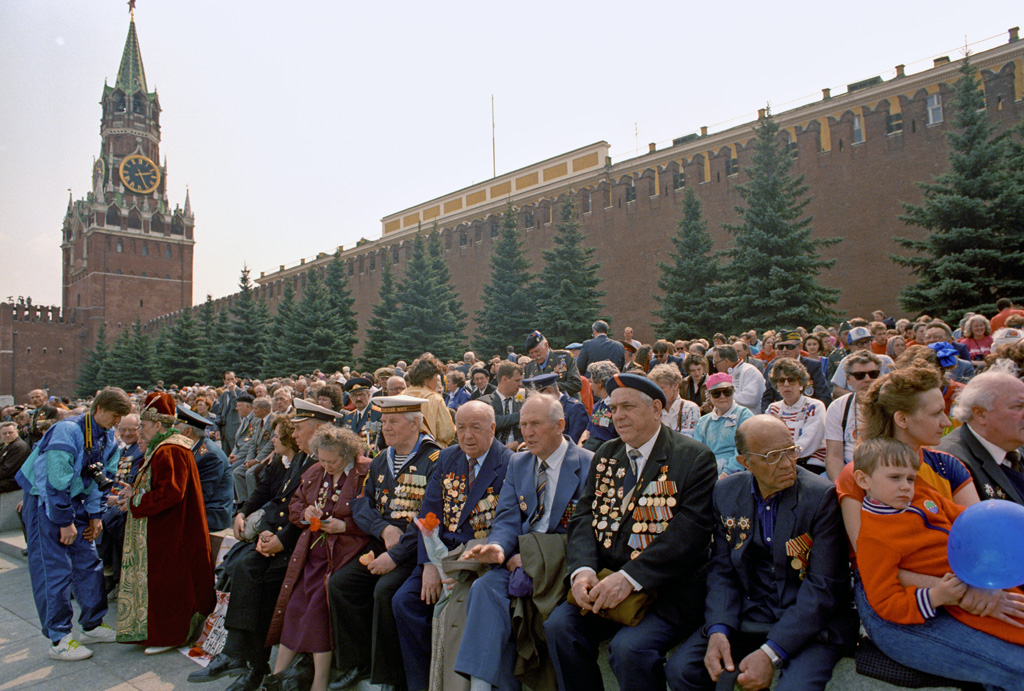
Image from the peace parade (Red Square, Moscow) via RIA Novosti

The "Victory of Peace" parade was held in Moscow's Red Square on 9 May 1992 to commemorate the capitulation of Nazi Germany in the Second World War on Victory Day.

It was held in Russia following the collapse of the Soviet Union under the leadership of the Russian president Boris Yeltsin. It featured no tanks or military equipment, and included foreign veterans and representatives, including survivors of the Nazi concentration camps. Set in a mournful atmosphere, the parade was intended to signal the start of a more pro-Western, non-militaristic tradition in Russia.

There were a number of demonstrations against the parade by disaffected communists, who thought that the parade was too "festive", as well as supporters of the Russian secessionist state of Transnistria in Moldova and neo-fascist Pamyat activists. However, Serge Schmemann writing for The New York Times noted at the time:

the large majority of veterans stayed clear of the demonstrators or argued with them. For the most part they showed neither anger nor resentment, but more a shared memory of a sweet moment when things seemed clear and joyous, and a shared dismay at their lot.

== See also ==
- Pobedobesie – Derogatory term for Victory Day celebrations in Russia
- Victory Day Parades – Typical military parades
  - Moscow Victory Parade of 1945 – Parade commemorating Soviet victory against Nazism in 1945
