= Andrey Piontkovsky =

Russian scientist, political writer and analyst (born 1940)

- Андрей Пионтковский
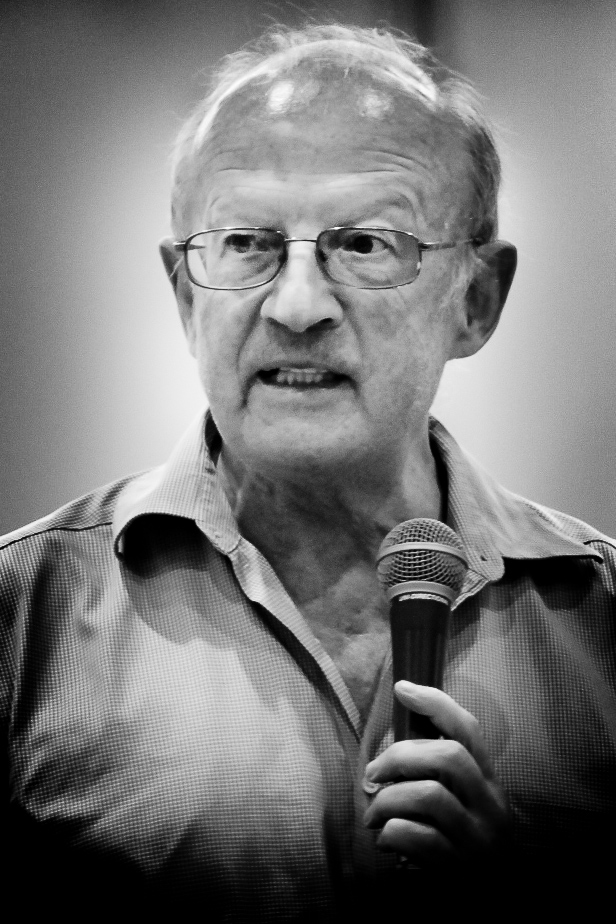
- Piontkovsky in 2011
- Born: 30 June 1940 (age 86); Moscow, Russian SFSR, Soviet Union
- Education: Moscow State University
- Scientific career
- Fields: Mathematics, political analysis
- Workplaces: Strategic Studies Center, Moscow, Russia
- Website: YouTube channel

Piontkovsky's voice
from Piontkovsky’s interview for Ekho Moskvy, 22 February 2014

Andrey Andreyevich Piontkovsky (Russian: Андрей Андреевич Пионтковский, born 30 June 1940) is a Russian-Georgian scientist and political writer and analyst, a member of International PEN Club. He is a former member of the Russian Opposition Coordination Council.

== Biography ==
=== Mathematics career ===
He graduated from the Mathematics Department of Moscow State University and has published more than a hundred scientific papers on applied mathematics. Piontkovsky is a member of the American Mathematical Society. Early in his career he wrote on the terminal control problem, and nonstationary nonlinear systems. Later papers were devoted to the mathematical modelling of strategic stability in the Cold War dual opponent system.

=== Polemical career ===
In his article published on 11 January 2000 in Sovetskaya Rossiya and placed on the Yabloko website on the same day, was the first to use the term "putinism" which he had defined as "the highest and final stage of bandit capitalism in Russia, the stage where, as one half-forgotten classic said, the bourgeoisie throws the flag of the democratic freedoms and the human rights overboard; and also as a war, "consolidation" of the nation on the ground of hatred against some ethnic group, attack on freedom of speech and information brainwashing, isolation from the outside world and further economic degradation". In the same article, Piontkovsky stated that putinism is the terminal shot to the head of Russia, and also he compared Yeltsin to Hindenburg who in 1932 gave Hitler power over Germany.

Piontkovsky was an executive director of the Strategic Studies Center (Moscow) think tank that has been closed since 2006. He contributed regularly to Novaya Gazeta, The Moscow Times, The Russia Journal and the online journals Grani.ru and Transitions Online. He is also a regular political commentator for the BBC World Service and Radio Liberty in Moscow. He was an outspoken critic of Putin's "managed" democracy in Russia and, as such, has described Russia as a "soft totalitarian regime" and "hybrid fascism."

Piontkovsky is the author of several books on the Putin presidency in Russia, including his most recent book, Another Look Into Putin's Soul.

Piontkovsky is one of the 34 first signatories of the online anti-Putin manifesto "Putin Must Go", published on 10 March 2010. In his subsequent articles he has repeatedly stressed its importance and urged citizens to sign it.

On 26 June 2013, Piontkovsky commented the case of Edward Snowden by saying, "If Pushkov dares to draw a parallel between Snowden and Soviet dissidents, I must respond that none of them had anything to do with Soviet special services and none of them pledged not to betray state and departmental secrets."

Piontkovsky compared the Crimean speech of Vladimir Putin in 2014 to Hitler's speech on Sudetenland in 1939. He described Putin as using "the same arguments and vision of history" and beyond that, that this speech played a key role in starting the war in Donbas.

In 2016 he published an article "Бомба, готовая взорваться" ("A bomb that is ready to explode") about Russian-Chechen ethnic conflict. When the General Prosecutor Office found his article "extremist" and started criminal prosecution Piontkovsky at last left Russia on 19 February 2016.

==== 2014 condemnation of fascism ====
Piontkovsky adduces Igor Girkin's name among those of like-minded persons and says, "The authentic high-principled Hitlerites, true Aryans Dugin, Prokhanov, Prosvirnin, Kholmogorov, Girkin, Prilepin are a marginalized minority in Russia." Piontkovsky adds, "Putin has stolen the ideology of the Russian Reich from the domestic Hitlerites, he has preventively burned them down, using their help to do so, hundreds of their most active supporters in the furnace of the Ukrainian Vendée." In his interview with Radio Liberty, Piontkovsky says that maybe the meaning of the operation conducted by Putin is to reveal all these potential passionate leaders of social revolt, send them to Ukraine and burn them in the furnace of the Ukrainian Vendée.

=== Exile in America ===
In an interview published on 11 February 2022 Piontkovsky argues that the ideology of Rashism is in many ways similar to German fascism (Nazism), while in an interview published on 11 August 2021 he opines that the speeches and policies of Putin are similar to the ideas of Hitler.

Piontkovsky has written extensively on political affairs for the Jamestown Foundation, the Kyiv Post, and Project Syndicate. His byline includes mention that he is a visiting fellow at the Hudson Institute.

== Some works ==
In English

- "Modern-day Rasputin". The Moscow Times. 12 November 1997.
- Piontkovsky, Andrei; Tsygichko, Vitali (August 1998). "Russia and NATO after Paris and Madrid: a perspective from Moscow". Contemporary Security Policy. 19 (2): 121–125. doi:10.1080/13523269808404196.
- Piontkovsky, Andrei (17–23 January 2000). "Stasi for president" (PDF). The Russia Journal. 3 (1): 5. Archived from the original on 13 October 2015.
- "Obseqiousness toward Putin". The Washington Times. 29 September 2005.
- Another look into Putin's soul. Washington, DC: Hudson Institute. 2006. ISBN 1558131515.
- East or West? Russia's identity crisis in foreign policy (PDF). London: Foreign Policy Centre. 2006. ISBN 1903558786. Archived from the original (PDF) on 30 September 2006.
- Russian Identity. Washington, DC: Hudson Institute. 2008. ISBN 978-1558131620.
- Andrei Piontkovsky (April 2009). "The dying mutant". Journal of Democracy. 20 (2): 52–55. doi:10.1353/jod.0.0074. S2CID 153474174.
- "Putinism may be fading". The Moscow Times. 7 April 2010.
- "The Caucasus dark circle". The Moscow Times. 1 June 2011.
- "The Russian spring has begun. The Putin regime will never recover legitimacy, but financial interests mean it will hang on as long as it can". The Wall Street Journal. 14 December 2011.
- "From protest to nausea". The Moscow Times. 2 February 2012.
- "The 4 stages of putinism". The Moscow Times. 6 March 2013.
- "Putin fears democracy in Ukraine". The Moscow Times. 1 June 2014.

In Russian

- Gelovani, Viktor; Yegorov, Vsevolod; Mitrophanov, Viktor; Piontkovsky, Andrey (1974). Решение одной задачи управления для глобальной динамической модели Форрестера [The solution of one task for Forrester’s world dynamics model]. Автоматика и телемеханика (in Russian) (56). The Keldysh Institute of Applied Mathematics of the USSR Academy of Sciences.
- Yurchenko, Valentin; Gelovani, Viktor; Piontkovsky, Andrey (1975). О задаче управления в глобальной модели World-3 [On the task of governing in world model WORLD-3] (in Russian). Moscow: The Institute for Problems of Management of the USSR Academy of Sciences.
- Yegorov, Vsevolod; Kallistov, Yuri; Mitrophanov, Viktor; Piontkovsky, Andrey (1980). Математические модели глобального развития [Mathematical models of world development] (in Russian). Leningrad: Гидрометеоиздат.
- Исследование стратегической стабильности методами математического моделирования [The study of strategic stability by the methods of mathematical modeling] (in Russian). Moscow: The Institute of System Analysis of the USSR Academy of Sciences. 1988.
- Gelovani, Viktor; Piontkovsky, Andrey; Yemeliyanov, Stanislav (1997). Эволюция концепций стратегической стабильности (Ядерное оружие в XX и XXI веке) [Evolution of conceptions of strategical stability (Nuclear weapons in the 20th and 21st centuries)] (in Russian). Moscow: РАЙМС. ISBN 5876640840.
- Путинизм как высшая и заключительная стадия бандитского капитализма в России [Putinism as the highest and final stage of bandit capitalism in Russia] (in Russian). Yabloko. 11 January 2000.
- Огонь За Родину! За Абрамовича! Огонь! [For motherland! For Abramovich! Fire!] (PDF) (in Russian). Moscow: ЭПИцентр. 2005. ISBN 589069099X. Archived (PDF) from the original on 11 May 2005.
- Нелюбимая страна [Unloved country] (in Russian). Moscow: Yabloko. 2006. ISBN 5856910613.
- Третий путь …к рабству [The third way …to slavery] (PDF) (in Russian). Moscow: M.Graphics Publishing. 2014 [2010]. ISBN 978-1934881422. Archived (PDF) from the original on 19 July 2014.
- Захар Прилепин как зеркало путинского фашизма [Zakhar Prilepin as a mirror of Putin's fascism] (in Russian).
- Чёртова дюжина Путина: Хроники последних лет [The baker's dozen of Putin. The chronicles of last years] (in Russian). Moscow: Алгоритм. 2014. ISBN 978-5443806396.
- Искушение Владимира Путина [Vladimir Putin’s temptation] (in Russian). Moscow: Алгоритм. 2013. ISBN 978-5443803296.
- His articles in The Jamestown Foundation
- His articles in Project Syndicate
- The Law of the Nerd, English translation from grani.ru
- His articles in grani.ru (Russian)
- Putin's Russia as a Revisionist Power

== Video ==
- "Vladimir Putin and Russia's increasingly aggressive nuclear threat (with the video of Piontkovsky's speech)". Hudson Institute. 1 October 2014.
- А. Пионтковский: "Путину нужна большая война" (A.Piontkovsky, "Putin needs a big war", in Russian with English subtitles, 17 November 2015, 22 min) on YouTube
- А. Пионтковский: "Жёсткий анализ ситуации" (A.Piontkovsky, "Harsh situation analysis", in Russian with English subtitles, 9 December 2015, 15 min) on YouTube
