= Steven Stalinsky =

Executive Director of the Middle East Media Research Institute

- Occupations: Executive director, memri scholar author columnist
- Years active: 1988–present

Academic background
- Education: Walden University (PhD)

Academic work
- Main interests: Middle East, Islamic terrorism, Terrorism, American Foreign Policy
- Notable works: American Traitor: The rise and fall of Al-Qaeda's U.S.-Born Leader Adam Gadahn(2017)

Steven Stalinsky is an American scholar of the Middle East and terrorism whose writings focus on the interplay between Islamic terrorism and technology, and especially terrorism and social media. He has served as executive director of the Middle East Media Research Institute (MEMRI) since 1999.

== Commentary ==
=== On terrorism and social media ===
Stalinsky has published analysis on the use of social media by Al-Qaeda and ISIS. He has been interviewed by media outlets about terrorist use of social media, especially about terrorist use of Telegram, VK, and encryption.

Stalinsky's writing on Al-Qaeda's online magazine Inspire was cited in a U.S. Department of Justice terrorism case. In 2013 and 2014, several media organizations used Stalinsky's research describing the indoctrination and exploitation of young children by Al-Qaeda and other jihadist groups.

Stalinsky also spent years pressing Twitter to take action about jihadis' use of their social networking service – efforts which culminated in a 2013 congressional letter to the FBI urging them to take action.

=== On the use of cryptocurrency by terrorists ===
On December 17, 2018, Stalinsky published an opinion piece in The Wall Street Journal titled "The cryptocurrency-terrorism connection is too big to ignore."

=== On terrorism and AI use ===
Since 2023, Stalinsky has written several articles detailing terrorist and Neo-Nazi use of AI for recruiting, propaganda, planning attacks.

=== On terrorism and drone use ===
Stalinsky co-authored a study for MEMRI on the Islamic State of Iraq and the Levant's and other Jihadi organizations use of drones that has been cited by many media outlets. The Washington Post subsequently interviewed Stalinsky for an article on how Islamic State uses unmanned aerial vehicles.

=== On Muslim communities in the US ===
On February 2, 2024, Stalinsky published an opinion piece on The Wall Street Journal titled "Welcome to Dearborn, America's Jihad Capital". The article criticized the Dearborn, Michigan, community for perceived "enthusiasm for jihad against Israel and the West" stemming from the Hamas led terror attack on Israel on October 7, 2023. Dearborn mayor Abdullah Hammoud described Stalinsky's article as being "inflammatory" and linked it with "an alarming increase in bigoted and Islamophobic rhetoric online targeting the city of Dearborn". President Joe Biden and Gov. Gretchen Whitmer joined in the condemnation.

=== On anti-Israel protests in American Universities ===
On April 22, 2024, Stalinsky published an opinion piece in The Wall Street Journal titled "Who's behind the Anti-Israel Protest".
