= Lovell Minnick Partners =

International private equity firm

Lovell Minnick Partners is a private equity firm focused on investments in middle market financial and related business services companies in North America and Europe.

== History and structure ==
Lovell Minnick was founded in 1999 by financial services executives Jeffrey D. Lovell and James E. Minnick. The firm currently has offices in Philadelphia, Los Angeles and New York.

The firm has raised over $6 billion in committed capital since inception from institutional investors such as public and private pension funds, insurance companies, endowments and foundations. The firm has invested in more than 50 portfolio companies and made over 200 add-on acquisitions in the last 25 years. Some of the firm’s notable previously owned investments include ALPS, J.S. Held, Worldwide Facilities, Duff & Phelps, and AssetMark. More recent investments include SRS Acquiom, Mercer Advisors (which was sold to Oak Hill Capital in 2019), Foreside Financial Group, CenterSquare Investment Management, Tortoise Capital Advisors, and Inside Real Estate.

== Strategy ==
Lovell Minnick Partners targets portfolio companies across financial services and business services. Some of the areas of specialization include wealth management, insurance brokerage and services, payments, financial and insurance technology, and business services.

Fund summaries:

FUND	AMOUNT	VINTAGE	SELECT INVESTMENTS
FUND I	$105 Million	2000	AssetMark, Duff & Phelps, Stein Roe Investment Counsel
FUND II	$224 Million	2005	ALPS, Seaside National Bank & Trust, Mercer Advisors
FUND III	$456 Million	2010	Lincoln Investment Planning, Matthews, H.D. Vest, First Allied, Commercial Credit
FUND IV	$750 Million	2015	CenterSquare Investment Management, J.S. Held; Engage People, Tortoise Capital Advisors, Worldwide Facilities, Foreside
FUND V	$1.28 Billion	2019	oneZero, Fortis, Pathstone, Warner Pacific, W1M, Xactus
