= Ajay Goyal =

Indian businessman (born 1965)

Ajay Goyal (born 12 July 1965) is an Indian entrepreneur, investor, philanthropist and writer. He is the founder and owner of Europe's first five star yoga themed sustainable resort hotel, Zening Resorts. Goyal founded the Norasco Group in Cyprus in 1993 with branches in Switzerland, Germany, Russia, Ukraine, Singapore and India. He is a founder of more than 20 ventures. He is presently the founder and CEO of AGV (Ajay Goyal Ventures, a Norasco company), an E-learning, E-commerce, Travel, Reg Tech and Health Tech incubator that invests in European startups. Goyal is the author of the book "Uncovering Russia". Goyal was Publisher and Editor in Chief of The Russia Journal newspaper, published from Moscow, Russia and Washington DC, from 1998 until 2005.

== Early life and education ==
Goyal was born in Kurukshetra, India into a family of esteemed academics. His father, J.B. Goyal, PhD, authored 30 published books on Hindi literature and Sikh culture and was the Dean of faculty of the arts and languages at Kurukshetra University in India. His mother, a doctorate in literature, was a university professor.

Goyal graduated cum laude with a Bachelor of Engineering in mechanical engineering from the National Institute of Technology in Kurukshetra, India in 1986.

== Career ==
In 1987, Goyal began his career on the Indian national television network Doordarshan, where he was a quiz show host and an anchor for youth and cultural programs. He worked simultaneously for a year as an engineer and international business development executive at Indian export house Fortune International Ltd. He joined Mekaster India as an export executive to Eastern European markets in 1988.

In 1989, Goyal left India to explore business opportunities in Germany and Eastern Europe. He was founding partner of Comecon Overseas Ltd in 1989 and relocated to Moscow during perestroika years. He founded a historic first joint venture Indian-Russian software technology company Eurolink in 1990. He founded a private equity and counter-trade company Norasco Ltd. in 1993 that grew to 240 employees and offices in six countries. Goyal invested in Russian privatization and acquired stakes in several industries in Russia. He became the single largest shareholder of SovTradeFinan Bank and served as deputy chairman of the Board to Chairman Viktor Geraschenko, Chairman of State Bank of Russia. Goyal founded 8 dot com ventures in Russia.

Goyal lived in Russia amidst political turmoil. In 1991, he spent days and nights in protest against the coup in human chains outside the Russian White House where Boris Yeltsin was taking a stand against the junta that ousted Mikhail Gorbachev. In 1997, Goyal wound up or sold his business interests, citing high corruption, crime, and western investors' irrational exuberance over Russia, and took a sabbatical at the Harvard Institute of International Development (HIID). In 1998, the Russian economy collapsed in default, and the 1998 Russian financial crisis ensued.

Goyal did not complete his program at Harvard and demanded his money back after disagreements with program director Jeffrey Sachs over its Russia aid programs. HIID was dissolved in 1999 after scandals and the Russian Aid Controversy rocked Harvard's Russia programs. Goyal returned to Russia to launch new ventures.

In 1998, Goyal founded The Russia Journal, a newspaper published from Moscow, Russia and Washington D.C., United States that was distributed throughout Europe. He served as Publisher and Chief Editor until the journal's last publication in 2005. The Russia Journal investigated Russian oligarchs and became known for its independence. The newspaper was known for its bold, uncompromising investigative coverage of Russia, where equal opportunity was given to reporters and columnists from the left and right. In 2000, The Russia Journal filed anti-monopoly complaints against the largest print media company of Russia. The investigative and hard-hitting journalism of Goyal's newspaper in Russia made him a target for many threats and lawsuits from Russian oligarchs. He was an early supporter of President Vladimir Putin and a staunch critic of "Russia's Robber Barons," including Boris Berezovsky and Mikhail Khodorkovsky. Goyal spoke out against the hypocrisies of certain western press organizations and businesses in a documentary titled Cold Politics that was broadcast on Russia's state-owned television channel ORT in the run up to the 2012 Presidential elections. During his years as publisher of The Russia Journal, Goyal was the target of pranks from The eXile's Matt Taibbi. Goyal ended up publishing Taibbi as a columnist for The Russia Journal, and allowed Taibbi to publish his own criticism in the journal. Goyal praised Taibbi for his bold and truthful reporting from Russia when he left The eXile and Russia to work in the United States, and later became lead reporter at Rolling Stone magazine. Goyal and the newspaper were also a target for Mike McFaul, former U.S. Ambassador to Russia and former professor at Stanford, who, after a slew of angry emails, threatened to sue The Russia Journal. During his time in Russia, Goyal went on to create additional market-leading internet companies in news, classifieds, entertainment, and jobs. In 1999, he launched popular dating site match.ru, Loot.ru, a Russian classifieds site. In 2005, he launched Russian career and jobs portal TheLeader.ru, and later launched Russian mortgage magazine Kakaya Ipoteka. In 2000, Goyal became the founding director of the Russian Digital Alliance, a club of Russian software companies. By 2005, sensing a change in political environment and enhanced risks for foreign investors, Goyal started to sell off his media assets and exited Russia once again. He then developed a slate of films, writing scripts and acquiring rights through Norasco Films Ltd. Goyal has been vocal in his support of Putin and the Crimean Referendum to merge with the Russian Federation.

In 2011, Goyal began the development of Zening Resorts, a spiritual, yoga, meditation wellness resort concept in Cyprus . The eco-friendly resort opened in 2013 as sustainable and holistic holiday resort in Latchi, Paphos, Cyprus. Zening has 145 luxury cottages and offers yoga, meditation, detox, spa treatments, and a variety of workshops. Zening is Europe’s first resort dedicated to yoga, meditation, and wellness, and was named one of Europe’s leading wellness resorts by Condé Nast Traveller. ZENING’s launch in July 2013 was considered a major triumph in the resort’s early history as Goyal dealt with years of bureaucratic obstacles as a foreign investor. Goyal faced many problems from local contractors and organized crime that delayed the opening of the resort, and was eventually granted a meeting at the Presidential Palace to speak on issues facing foreign investors in Cyprus. Goyal has created many ventures in Cyprus including a successful restaurant in Limassol and the first all-natural and herbal beauty spa in Limassol in partnership with Shahnaz Husain of India.

== Political activity ==
In India’s 2009 General Elections, Goyal ran as an independent candidate for Indian parliament on an anti-corruption platform from Chandigarh. He confronted national media on the use of "paid press." In one of the first live election debates, he faced candidates from three major parties. Goyal was noted for a transparent declaration of his wealth in election filings. His campaign made many headlines for his door-to-door style which was unusual for Indian politics. Goyal lost by a wide margin. However, the winning candidate, Pawan Bansal, who was also appointed Minister by Prime Minister Manmohan Singh, had to resign in a major bribery scandal. After the elections, Goyal started a grass-root advocacy group called Lokmantra in India. He continues to campaign for greater awareness and participation in the democratic process, and remains actively engaged in philanthropic and social activities.

Goyal actively writes on climate change and green initiatives and advises a number of senior Indian leaders on development issues. He wrote from the Copenhagen Climate Change summit COP 15 for ABC Live, an online Indian news portal from.

== Philanthropy ==
In 2007, Goyal founded Gandhi's London social group which launched during the Indian festival of London. The organization provides London visitors a tour of London landmarks linked with Mahatma Gandhi.

== Authorship ==
Goyal is the author of the book Uncovering Russia, which includes some of his own articles and analysis from The Russia Journal. He has written over 100 analytical articles and reports on the Russian economic, business, and political conditions over the past several years.
