= Southern California InFocus =

Muslim newspaper in California, US

Southern California InFocus is a free monthly tabloid-format newspaper serving the Muslim community in Southern California. Its offices are in Anaheim.

InFocus was started in Anaheim, California on February 4, 2005. It is the largest Muslim newspaper in Southern California. Asma Ahmad, a Pakistani Canadian citizen who grew up in Saudi Arabia attending American-run schools and formerly edited the national newsletter of the Muslim Students Association, is the paper's managing editor and only full-timer staffer. Its deputy editor is Muneer Adhami.

The Council on American Islamic Relations financially subsidizes and provides office space for the newspaper, but the managing editor states that the paper is "editorially independent from CAIR". 20,000 copies of the paper are printed monthly; 500 copies are mailed to paid subscribers and the remainder are distributed free through Muslim-owned businesses and mosques in Southern California.

The paper "covers a large variety of local, national, and international events, features, profiles, and has the following sections: arts, book review, restaurant review, Islam, money, legal, kids, travel, interfaith, commentary, and opinion."

The paper describes its mission as:

"... serving to document the rich history of Muslims in the Southland – past and present. Through feature stories, mosque profiles, interviews of individuals who have made a difference, and in-depth coverage of news stories affecting Muslims, InFocus is the first localized effort in Southern California to record the American Muslim experience. For American Muslims, it is a platform which brings forth issues of their concern. For the larger community, it is a window into the Muslim world right here in California".

Managing editor Ahmad describes the paper as, "an Islamic newspaper but not a publication about Islam," and says she wants, "In Focus to concentrate on issues important to Muslims, such as civil rights and discrimination, which she says are largely ignored by the mainstream media in the post-Sept. 11 world." Ahmad said the community is committed to democracy. An editorial in the March issue offered qualified support for President Bush's Middle East policy and called for the democratization of Arab countries, urging Muslims to turn the "breeze of democracy into an unstoppable wind." More than anything, Ahmad said, she wants the newspaper to pull American Muslims into the mainstream. "We can keep our religion and not have an isolationist approach. We can do this in America," she said.
