= Pobedobesie =

Derogatory term for Victory Day celebrations in Russia

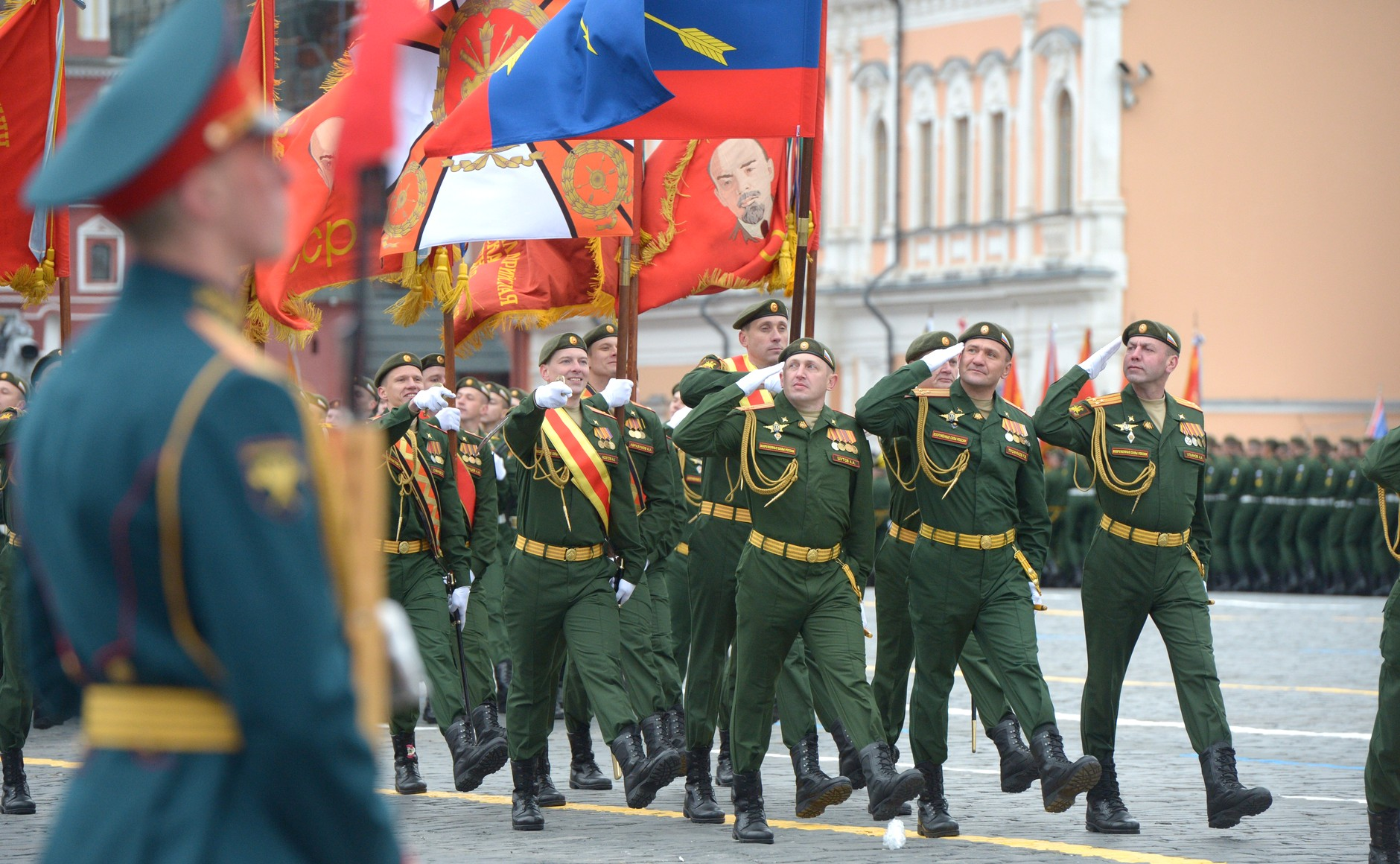
2021 Moscow Victory Day Parade. Military parades and Soviet military symbolism play an important role in the Victory Day celebrations across Russia.

Pobedobesie (Russian: победобесие, lit. 'victory frenzy, victory mania, or victory obsession') is a pejorative term used to describe the perceivably jingoistic celebrations of Victory Day in Russia. This has been also dubbed the Victory Cult.

The term has been further extended to refer to the weaponization of the legacy of the Second World War to justify Russia's aggressive policies and an increase of militarism, using the Soviet victory over Nazi Germany for propaganda purposes.

== Etymology ==
The term was coined by Russian Orthodox priest Georgy Mitrofanov in 2005 as his response to the celebrations of the 60th anniversary of the victory over Nazi Germany The word is coined in an analogy with the word мракобесие (obscurantism): победа ("victory") + '-бесие, a suffix signifying mania, frenzy, derived from the verb беситься, "to be in rage".

== Background ==
The main state holiday of the Soviet Union was 7 November, the day of the October Revolution. The day of 9 May was not a holiday between 1948 and 1965. Initially this was due to fresh traumatic memory of the war. During Khrushchev's era this was due to the desire to erase Joseph Stalin's legacy. With the Brezhnev era, Victory Day became an important holiday, which was in line with Brezhnev's efforts in "re-Stalinization". Over time the Soviet victory in World War II remained the only unifying story in chaotic post-Soviet Russia, which strived to dissociate itself from Communism (and hence the October Revolution).

== Propaganda and Putin ==
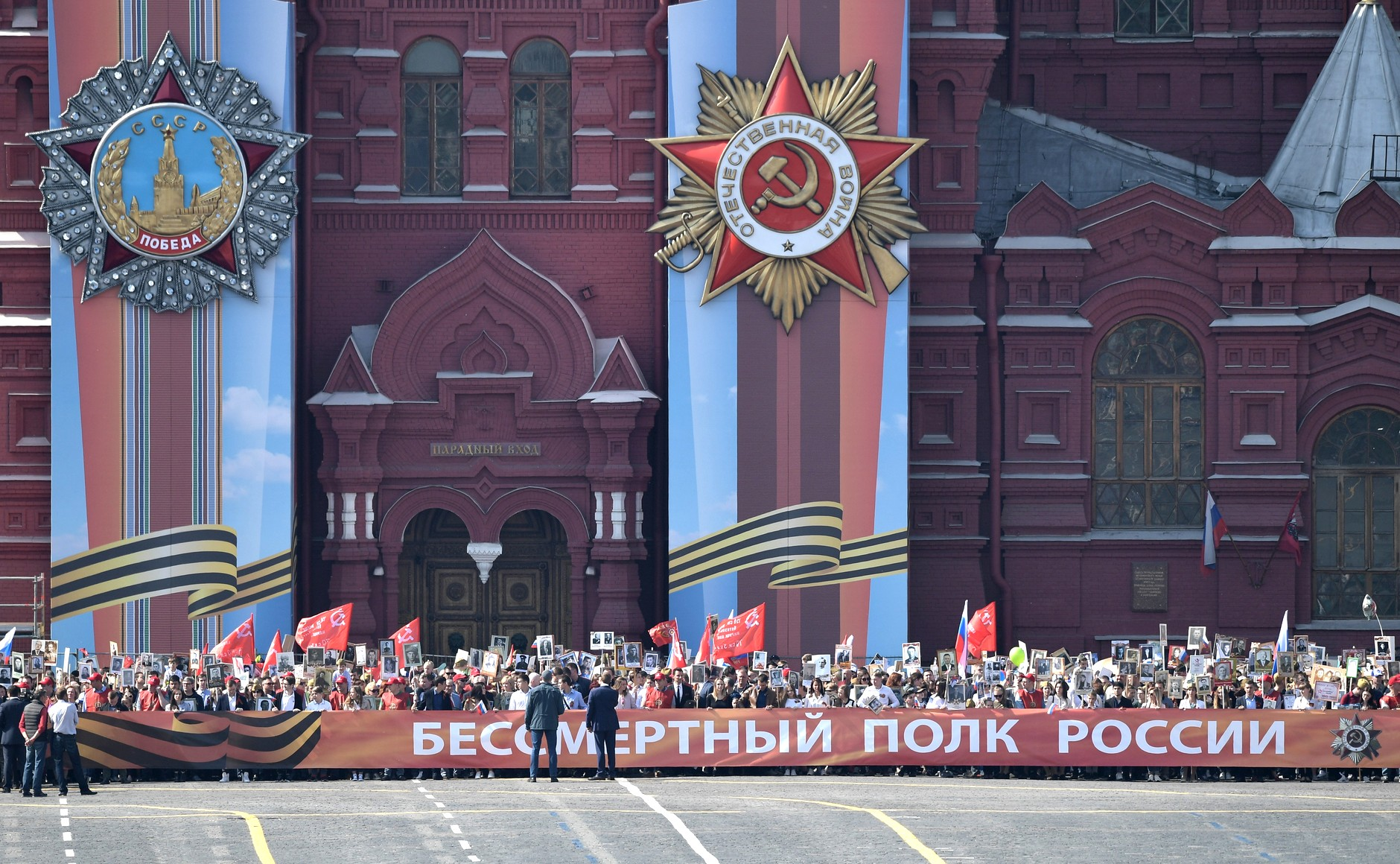
Immortal Regiment in Moscow, 2019

Victory Day has become an even more central holiday under Russian president Vladimir Putin, who according to critics has nurtured a "'cult' of the Great Patriotic War". Russia under Putin has also used the language of Russian victory over Nazi Germany to justify aggression towards Ukraine. The Great Patriotic War has, according to Shaun Walker of the Guardian, gradually become the "centrepiece of Vladimir Putin's concept of Russian identity over his two decades in charge". Russian propaganda expert and historian Ian Garner, states that Putin has reconstructed the Soviet "cult of the Great Patriotic War" in a "manner that has all the hallmarks of a religion", and that "the state's cult of the Second World War – has been incorporated into Orthodox Christianity, and vice versa". Julia Davis, a Russian media monitor, describes pobedobesie as "an unhealthy obsession with military might and past victories".

In a speech on Victory Day in 2000, shortly after becoming president, Putin addressed a group of veterans, stating: "Through you, we got used to being winners. This entered our blood. It was not just responsible for military victories, but will also help our generation in peaceful times, help us to build a strong and flourishing country."

According to Euromaidan Press pobedobesie has become "one of the most important parts of the propaganda" in Putin's Russia.

Putin's regime usurped the grassroots idea of Immortal Regiment and turned it into the statewide propaganda event similar to obligatory holiday rallies in the Soviet Union. (Note: In 2023 the Al-Russian march of the Immortal Regiment was cancelled under the pretext of "security". An opinion was expressed that it was done so due to fear that portraits of killed during the Russo-Ukrainian war will be carried and this can possibly lead to anti-war protests. The organizers recommended to use other formats of commemoration instead, e.g., place the portraits on car windshields of as badges on dress, etc..)

Noted elements identified with pobedobesie include Russian citizens "adding a papier maché turret to their child's pushchair to make it look like a tank, or daubing 'To Berlin' on their cars." In recent years, slogans such as "We can do it again" (Russian: "Можем повторить", romanized: Mozhem povtorit') have become popular.

== See also ==
- Cathedral of the Armed Forces
- Disinformation in the Russian invasion of Ukraine § Allegations of Nazism
- Ultranationalism
- Soviet imagery during the Russo-Ukrainian War
