= Mahmut Karaduman =

Turkish national and plaintiff in a famous libel case

Mahmut Karaduman was a Turkish national and the plaintiff in a famous libel case. The Long Island newspaper Newsday wrote a series of thirty-two articles entitled The Heroin Trail, which was awarded the Pulitzer Prize Gold Medal for public service. Karaduman sued Newsday over the following description:

The owner of the Karavan nightclub in Istanbul's Galatasaray Square, middle-aged Douman [Karaduman] divides his time between Istanbul, where his brother handles base shipments, and villas in Switzerland and Lebanon. He specializes in smuggling by the Black Sea route. His lieutenant, a Turk named Gabi Kaiat, lives in Bucharest and handles transshipments on the Romanian end.

Bob Greene, Les Payne and Knut Royce were the Newsday journalists Karaduman sued. Although Karaduman was cleared of the drug charge in that there had been proven "substantial falsity" in the stories, there was no judgment against Newsday in that the story had not been grossly irresponsible.

== Quotes about Karaduman ==
- "Four jurors showed up, all of them woman, all black. I learned a lot that day. They all told me that they were sure that Karaduman had been involved with drugs. They had believed Arras, but a number of them already had come to that view of Karaduman as they observed his own testimony. 'We could tell,' one of them told me, 'that you were worried that we would believe Karaduman. But we know drug dealers in Harlem, and we knew he was one.'"

== See also ==
- Floyd Abrams and The Heroin Trail case
