= The Russia Journal =

The Russia Journal is a Russian English-language website, which is no longer updated.

== History and profile ==
The Russia Journal was founded in 1998 by Indian-born entrepreneur Ajay Goyal, who served as publisher and chief editor. The magazine was published weekly in the early 2000s in Moscow and Washington. The monthly print magazine version ended in 2005. Its online activity continued until 2007 before it stopped offering new information. The Russia Journal published business news, analysis, commentary and information from Russia. The website offers an archive of its online version from 1999–2005.

Goyal´s book „Uncovering Russia” published some materials from the magazine.

== Content ==
The magazine was the first to publish Russian columnists from left and right in English language. Several of the staunchest early critics of Vladimir Putin including Andrei Piontkowski, Elene Rykovtseva, Otto Latsis, Alexander Goltz were regular contributors to The Russia Journal. The editorial line of the newspaper was anti-oligarch.
