= Julia Davis (journalist) =

American journalist

- Джулія Девіс
- Born: May 16, 1974 (age 52); Kyiv, Ukrainian SSR
- Citizenship: United States
- Education: National Technical University of Ukraine
- Occupations: journalist, disinformation expert, filmmaker
- Known for: filmmaking, exposing Russian disinformation
- Television: Russian Media Monitor
- Website: www.juliadavisnews.com

Julia Davis (Note: Ukrainian: Джулія Девіс, romanized: Dzhuliia Devis) (born Kyiv, 16 May 1974) is a Ukrainian-born American journalist, columnist and media analyst who worked in federal law enforcement in a supervisory capacity and had a career in filmmaking. She is best known for founding Russian Media Monitor, a project monitoring Russian state television, including its international outlets such as RT (formerly Russia Today).

Davis is a columnist for The Daily Beast and Center for European Policy Analysis, and a contributor to the Washington Post. She has been described as the "foremost U.S. expert on Russian government-controlled television and propaganda" and a "Russian TV whisperer for American ears".

Davis is a native speaker of Ukrainian and Russian, fluent in English, Spanish and studied basic Persian at California State University prior to her federal service.

== Education ==
Davis earned a Master’s Degree in Aviation and Spacecraft Engineering in the Kyiv Polytechnic Institute in Ukraine. Later she graduated with honors from the Federal Law Enforcement Training Center and received a certificate of outstanding achievement upon graduation.

== Career ==
=== Film industry ===
Davis began her career in the field of filming and production in 1995, working in film and television production as a director and writer. She is a member of many professional organisations, including the Academy of Television Arts & Sciences, Women In Film, and is a member of the Screen Actors Guild. Davis was the first to produce the musical score featuring the National Ukrainian Orchestra for Paramount Pictures.

=== Disinformation analysis ===
Until 2014 Davis was primarily focusing on filmmaking and investigative reporting. However, after Russia invaded Crimea, Davis was "dismayed to discover" the lack of reporting on that topic in the US, which led her to believe that the reason for that was the influence of English-speaking RT channel. RT claimed to be an alternative media outlet at the time, but it quickly turned to spread Russian disinformation regarding the Russo-Ukrainian war. In short, "the Kremlin's bullhorn was weaponized, spewing out blatant propaganda and outright fakes", Davis stated. Her coverage of Russian propaganda has exposed the Kremlin's cyber-warfare, fake news and disinformation efforts against the United States and other countries.

Davis served as a featured Russian expert with the Atlantic Council's disinformation portal.

On 21 May 2022 Davis was officially sanctioned by the Russian government. She expressed it as she's “in great company and honored to have been included.”

In 2024 Davis released her own book, titled In Their Own Words: How Russian Propagandists Reveal Putin’s Intentions, published by the Columbia University Press, with a foreword by historian Timothy Snyder.

== Russian Media Monitor ==
Regarding Davis's founding of the Russian Media Monitor, she has stated that "it felt like a very natural thing that, when the U.S. is under such an attack from that part of the world, that with the unique experiences and skills I have, and the language, that I jump in and try to do something about it."

During the 2022 Russian invasion of Ukraine, Russian Media Monitor has received attention for exposing some aggressive rhetoric on Russian television to international audiences, such as nuclear threats, as well as showing Russian media's prominent embrace of certain American personalities like Tucker Carlson and Tulsi Gabbard.

== Works ==
- "In Their Own Words: How Russian Propagandists Reveal Putin’s Intentions", Columbia University Press 2024 ISBN 978-3-8382-1909-7
