= Immortal Regiment =

Civil event in Russia

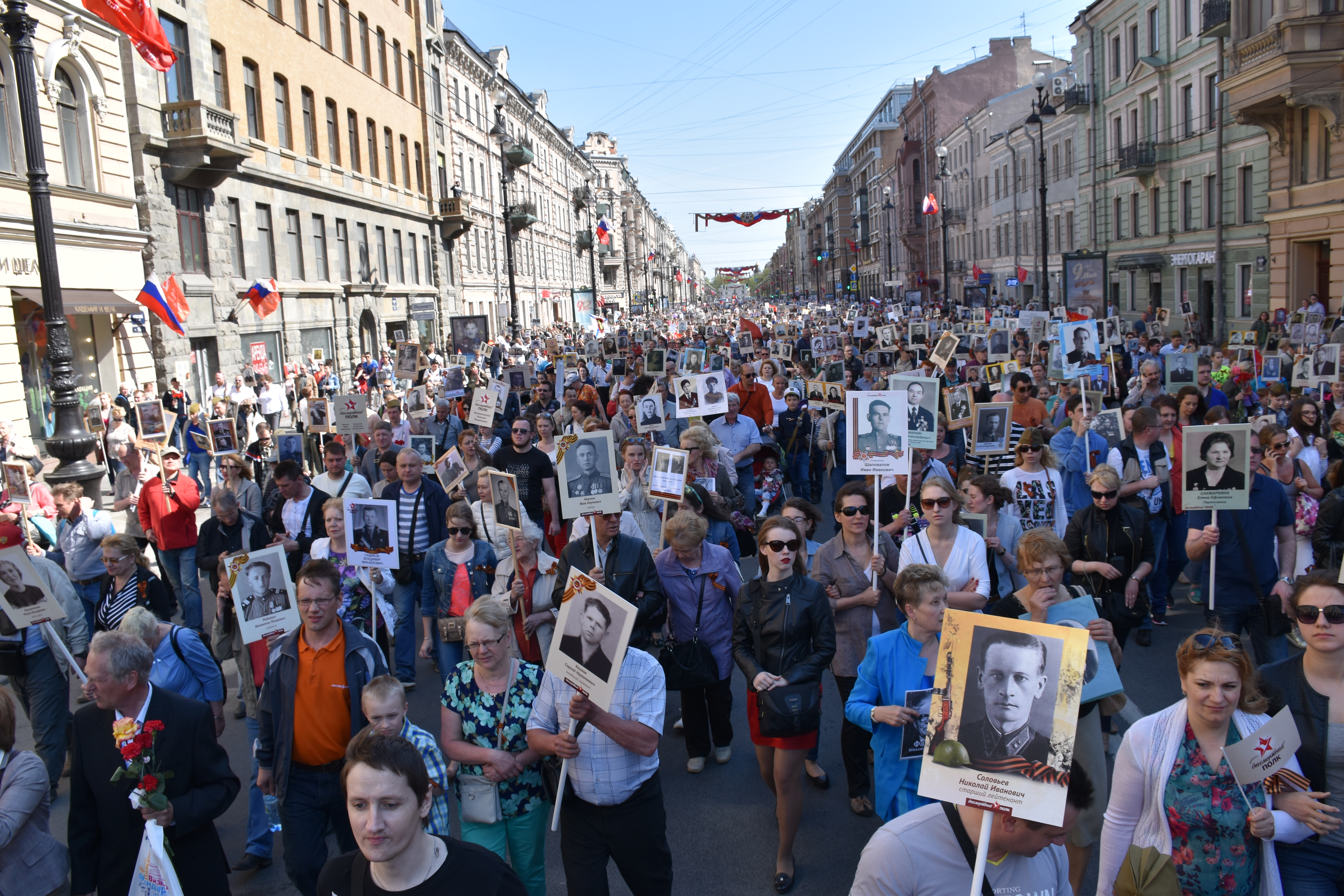
- Local residents in Saint Petersburg take part in the 2016 Immortal Regiment, carrying portraits of their ancestors who fought in the Great Patriotic War
- Date: 9 May (generally)
- Duration: 1 day
- Venue: Central squares and streets
- Location: Russia and other countries
- Also known as: Undead Regiment
- Type: cultural, military
- Website: https://www.moypolk.ru/

The Immortal Regiment (Russian: Бессмертный полк, romanized: Bessmertnyy polk) is a massive civil event in major cities in Russia and around the world every 9 May during the Victory Day celebrations. It is also a public non-profit organization, created in Russia on a voluntary basis with the aim of immortalizing the memory of home front workers, armed forces service personnel, partisans, personnel of resistance organizations, and personnel of law enforcement and emergency services. It involves people carrying on the memory of war veterans, with participants carrying pictures of relatives or family friends who served in the country's labor sector, paramilitary units, the Soviet Armed Forces and law enforcement organizations during the Second World War.

The main procession in Moscow usually follows the Moscow Victory Day Parade in the morning, and is a televised event aired all over the world. The front line of the procession carries a banner with the words Bessmertniy Polk written on it.

In Belarus the nongovernmental, independent procession has been met with a strong opposition from Belarusian President Alexander Lukashenko's government, to give an advantage to governmental processions and events on the day.

== History ==
=== Origins ===
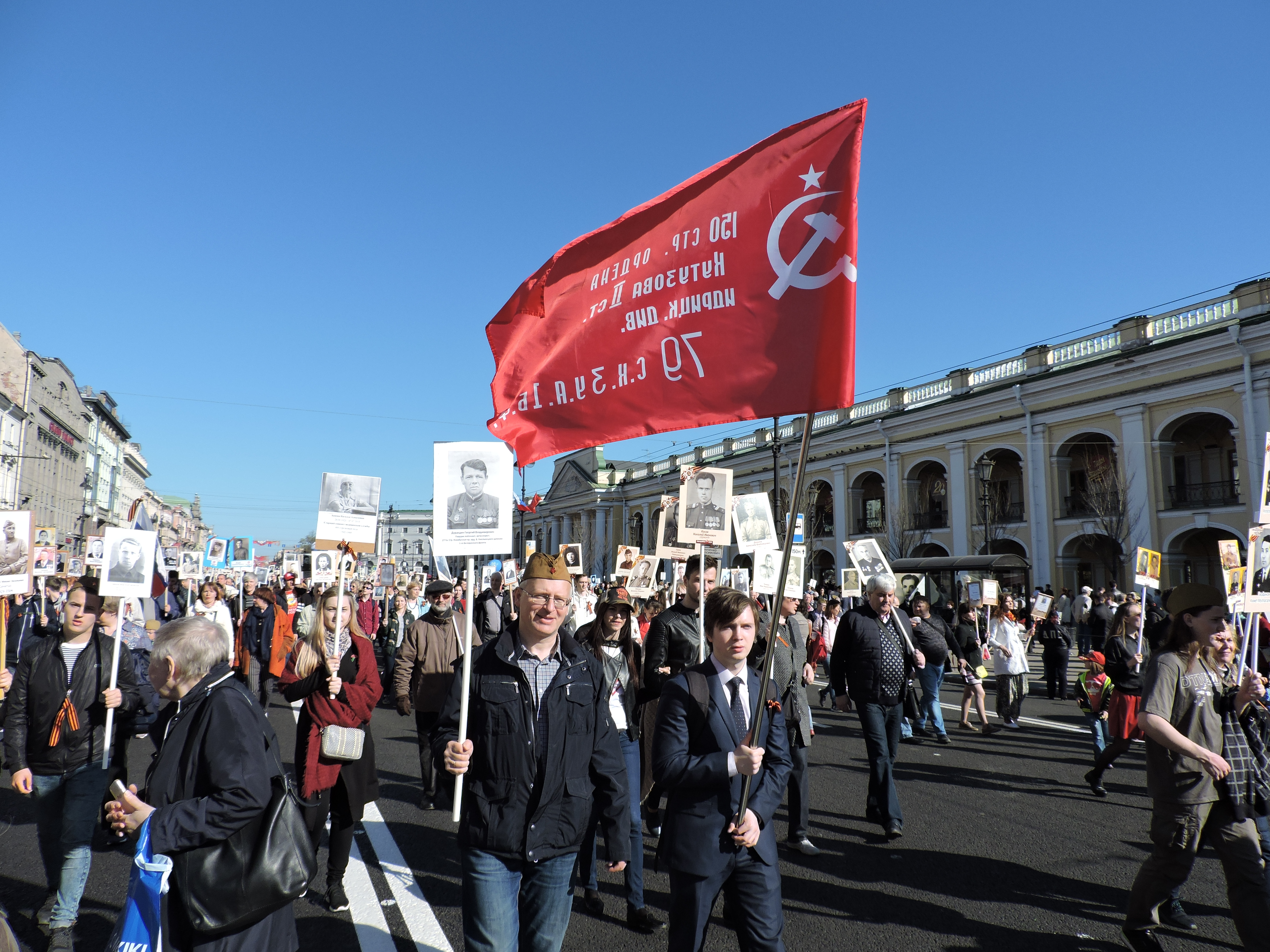
2018 Immortal Regiment participants march with a Soviet Victory Banner in Saint Petersburg

The 1941–45 period of World War II is known in Russia and Belarus as the "Great Patriotic War". During this war, which included many of the most lethal battle operations in human history, Soviet civilian and military casualties were about 20 million (or 27 according to latest Russian claims), accounting for a third of all World War II casualties. The full demographic loss was even greater. During the Soviet Union's existence, Victory Day was celebrated throughout the USSR and in the Soviet satellite states of the Eastern Bloc. The war became a topic of great importance in cinema, literature, history lessons at school, the mass media, and the arts.

Even before the name appeared, similar actions were organized in some cities of the USSR. The earliest known was held in 1965, marking the 20th anniversary, when students of Novosibirsk school number 121 walked through the streets of the city with photographs of participants in the war. In 1981, on the Square of the Fighters of the Revolution in Art a procession of mothers in black robes with portraits of their dead sons (the idea belonged to the director Yulia Sinelnikova) took place in the Rostov Oblast. In the post-Soviet years, similar events took place both in Russia and in a number of other countries. In Jerusalem in 1999, citizens took to the streets portraits of soldiers on Victory Day. In 2007, the Chairman of the Council of Veterans of the Tyumen Region Gennady Ivanov, conceived a parade of citizens holding pictures in a procession, with him gaining the idea of organizing a "Parade of Victors", in which people with portraits of their front-line relatives walked along the main Tyumen street.

=== Transition from an idea to a global event ===
==== First event with this name ====
In 2011, journalists Sergey Lapenkov, Sergey Kolotovkin and Igor Dmitriev noticed that fewer and fewer veterans took part in street processions on Victory Day. In the spirit of the holiday, they built on this idea and created an official organization. 9 May 2012 became the birth date of the movement in its modern form. A column of city residents passed through the streets of Tomsk, who carried placards with photographs of their relatives who fought in the Great Patriotic War. The rally, called the Immortal Regiment, was attended by more than six thousand people who carried more than two thousand portraits of war participants.

==== Geographical expansion of the event (2012–2014) ====
Since it was conceived in 2007, the initiative has been met with unprecedented support. Coverage in regional and federal Media has led to the popularity of the idea proposed by the creators of the action, has increased dramatically. After May 2012, a community of coordinators from different cities and countries began to take shape around Tomsk. In December 2012, representatives of more than 15 cities of Russia expressed a desire to organize an action. By February 2013, the number of cities had grown to 30 and was also expanded to four countries: Russia, Ukraine, Kazakhstan, and Israel (Hebrew: חטיבת הנצח בישראל, "Immortal Regiment in Israel" is a nonprofit non-political organization in charge of the event).

==== Global promotion (since 2015) ====
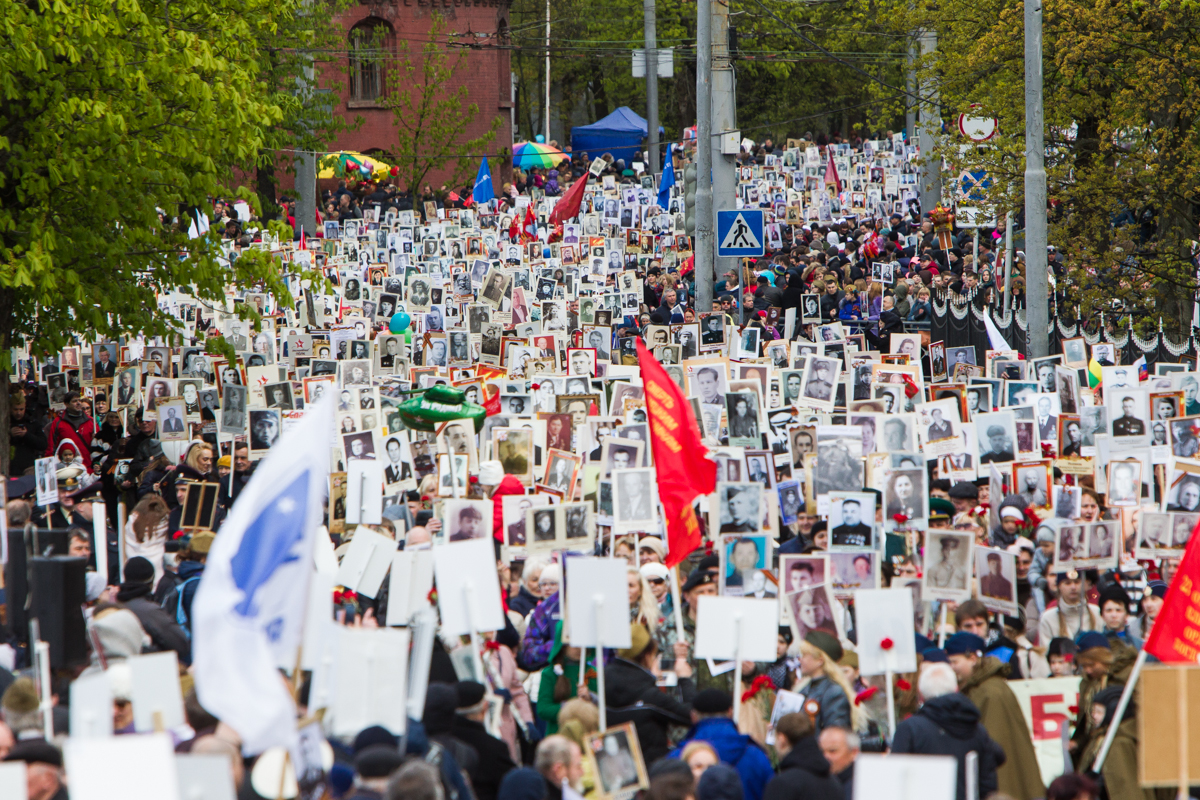
2017 Immortal Regiment in Kaliningrad

2015 Immortal Regiment on Moscow streets

Since it was introduced in 2012, it has been conducted in cities such as Moscow, Washington D.C., Tashkent, Berlin, and Yekaterinburg. By 2015, it had received national status in Russia. The Immortal Regiment therefore has become one of the most important elements of the celebrations of Victory Day in Russia.

In 2015, the "Immortal Regiment" was held in 1150 settlements of 17 countries, and 42 countries in 2016. In 2015, Moscow organizers proposed a march of the Immortal Regiment on the Red Square. To obtain the necessary permission, a corresponding request was sent to the President of the Russian Federation on behalf of three public organizations: the Immortal Regiment - Moscow, the All-Russian Popular Front and the Public Chamber of the Russian Federation. On 9 May 2015, the event took place for the first time on the Red Square, immediately after the 2015 Moscow Victory Day Parade in honor of the 70th anniversary. The intention to participate in the procession was expressed by more than 150 thousand people. According to the Moscow Police, more than 50 thousand people took part in it, including Russian President Vladimir Putin. The procession column passed from Belorusskaya Square to the Kremlin and completed the procession on Moskvoretskaya Embankment. The procession cost the state budget about 7,000,000 Russian rubles.

== Criticism ==
Critics, which even include Igor Dmitriev (the founder of the Immortal Regiment), have primarily alleged that the procession has turned into an attempt by the government to promote its own domestic and foreign policies, rather than to honor the memories of the millions who perished in the war. It has also come under criticism by those who charge that many of its participants have carried random photographs and discarded them after the event.

At the end of summer and autumn of 2018, various left-wing forces organized the "Shameful Regiment" marches, on which photographs of prominent political figures who supported raising the retirement age. It took place as part of the 2018 Russian pension protests.

== In Russia ==
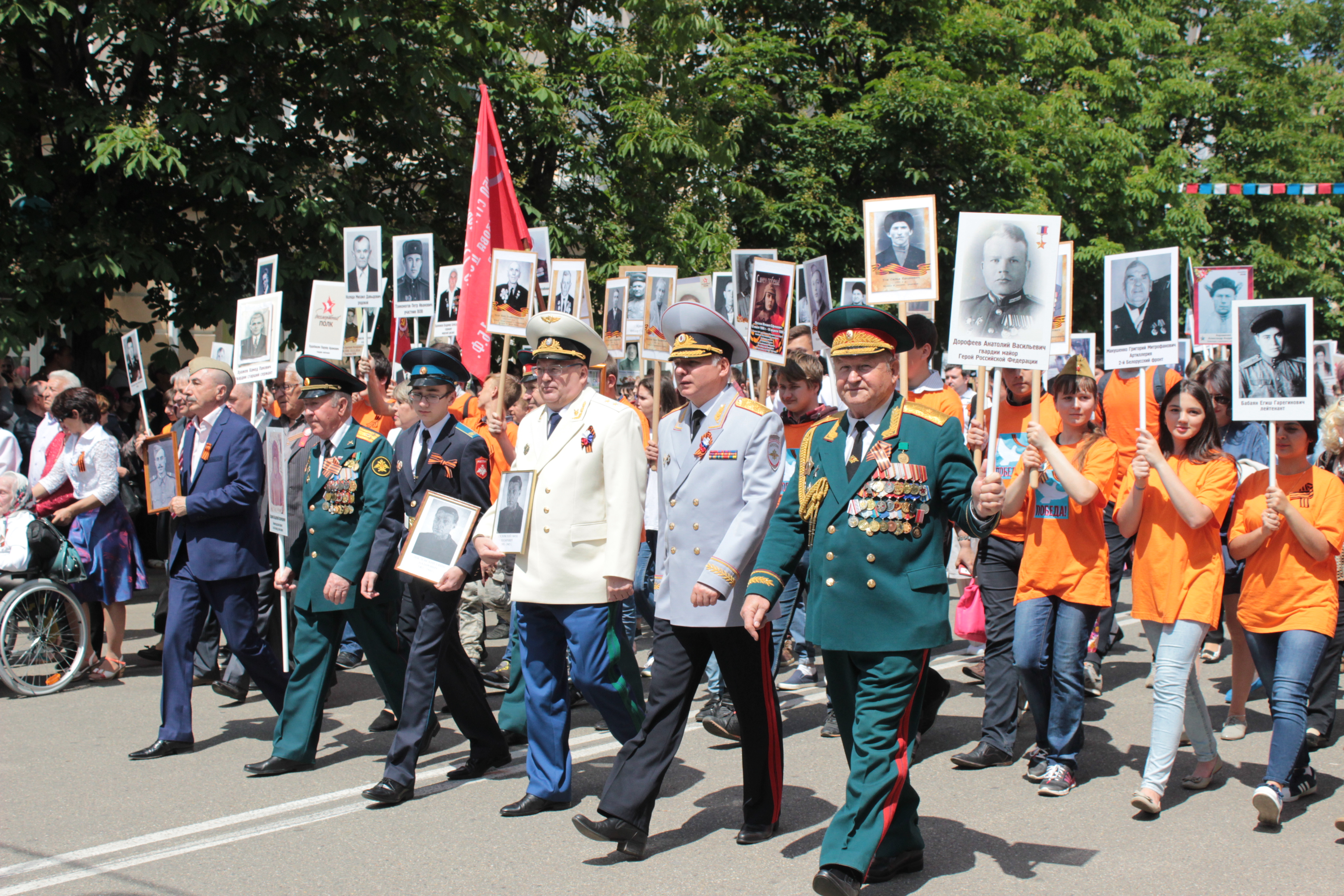
The 2016 procession in Maykop, the capital city of the Russian Republic of Adygea

Since 2015, the President Vladimir Putin and senior Russian officials have participated in the procession in Moscow. In 2020, as a result of the COVID-19 pandemic in Russia and the postponement of the 2020 Moscow Victory Day Parade, the Immortal Regiment march, which was supposed to be held on 9 May, was also postponed and was announced to be held Navy Day in a video-conference with President Putin and Defence Minister Sergey Shoygu. The reason that was given by President Putin was that "it is impossible to observe any distance by definition" in light of the pandemic. These plans were later scrapped and the march was postponed until 2021. The de facto Immortal Regiment that was held on 9 May took the form of an online webcast, being viewed more than 20 million times. It was the first time something like this was held, with more than 200 media screens throughout Moscow.

In 2023, the march was cancelled under the pretext of "security". An opinion was expressed that it was done so due to fear that portraits of those killed during the Russo-Ukrainian war would be carried, possibly leading to anti-war protests. The organizers recommended to use other formats of commemoration instead, e.g., place the portraits on car windshields or as badges on dress, etc.

On 19 April 2024, Head of the Republic of Crimea Sergey Aksyonov announced that, in the annexed territory, the Victory Day parade and the Immortal Regiment march of 2024 was cancelled for security reasons. Four days later member of the organizational committee of the Immortal Regiment Elena Tsunaeva announced that Russia has decided to cancel the march. Instead the idea was flouted to display portraits of veterans in public, as well as on street media screens and educational institutions.

== In other countries ==
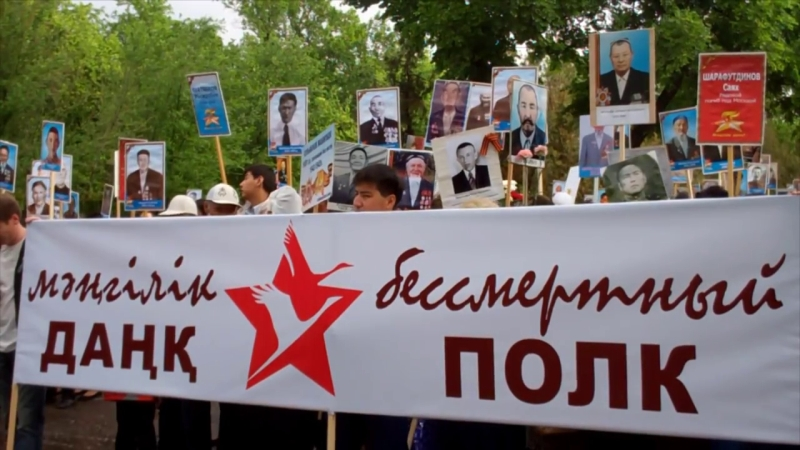
The 2015 Immortal Regiment in Shymkent

=== Former USSR ===
- Armenia – The event took place for the first time in this country in 2016. It is organized jointly by the Armenian Immortal Regiment NGO will and the Ministry of Defense. It usually begins at the Aram Khachaturian statue in Yerevan and aside from honoring the memory of the Armenians who served in the Second World War and the home front laborers of the republic during this period, also honors those who fell in the first Artsakh War and the 2016 Nagorno-Karabakh clashes.
- Azerbaijan – The event took place for the first time in this country in 2015.
- Belarus – The event took place in the country from 2012 to 2018.
- Estonia – The event took place for the first time in this country in 2015.
- Georgia – The event took place for the first time in this country in 2016.
- Kazakhstan – The event took place for the first time in this country in 2013.
- Kyrgyzstan – The event took place for the first time in this country in 2013.
- Latvia – The event took place for the first time in this country in 2015. Although Latvia does not officially recognize 9 May, the large Russian community held the procession as the main event near the now demolished Red Army monument in Riga.
- Lithuania – The event took place for the first time in this country in 2016.
- Moldova – The event took place for the first time in this country in 2016. On 15 April 2020, President Igor Dodon ordered the postponement of the diamond jubilee Victory Day celebrations, which included the Immortal Regiment march, to Liberation Day due to the coronavirus pandemic in Moldova.
- Tajikistan – The event took place for the first time in this country in 2016. In 2017, Tajik authorities decided not to go ahead the march due to security concerns and "Islamic traditions that do not approve of the public display of pictures of deceased people".
- Turkmenistan – The event took place for the first time in this country in 2016. In 2020, the Immortal Regiment took place at the Joint Turkmen-Russian Secondary School and at a military parade that was held at a square in front of the Halk Hakydasy Memorial Complex in the capital of Ashgabat. The procession was led by a cadet of the Berdimuhamed Annayev 1st Specialized Military School carrying a portrait of Berdinuhamed Annayev (the grandfather of President Gurbanguly Berdimuhamedow).
- Ukraine – The event took place in the country from 2012 to 2014. During the celebrations of the Victory Day over Nazism in World War II in Ukraine, the annual Immortal Regiment march was frequently disrupted by nationalists waving flags of the anti-Soviet Ukrainian Insurgent Army. Following the annexation of Crimea by the Russian Federation in 2014, participation of any kind in the Immortal Regiment is often seen as a statement in support of Russia's foreign policy against Ukraine, which has resulted in the event now largely being associated with pro-Russian groups in the country.

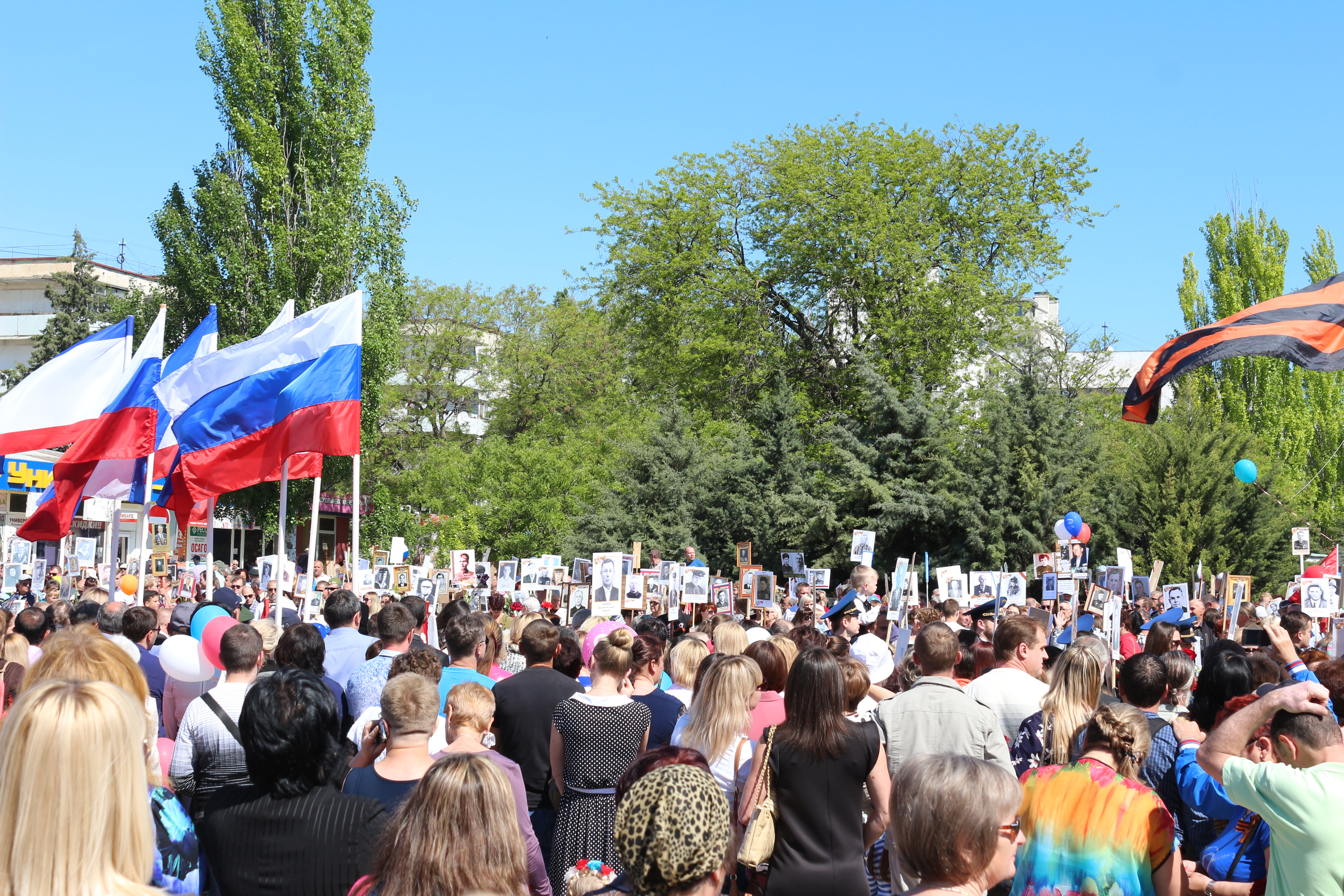
Immortal Regiment in Russian-occupied Crimea, 2016

- Uzbekistan – The event took place for the first time in this country in 2016. The authorities of Uzbekistan refused to hold the rally in 2017.

==== Partly recognized or unrecognized nations ====
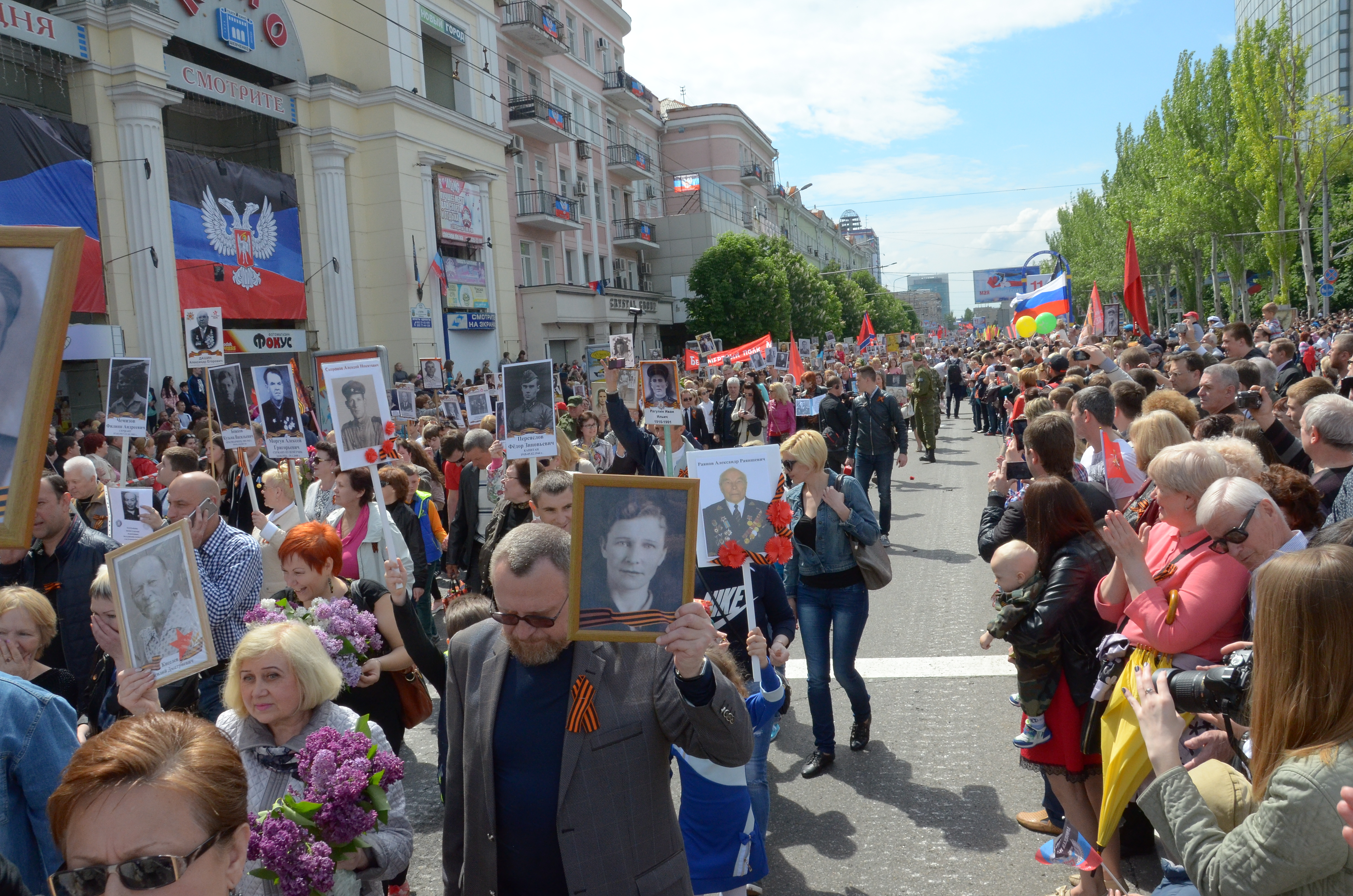
The 2016 procession in the Donetsk People's Republic

- Abkhazia – The event took place for the first time here in 2014.
- Luhansk People's Republic and Donetsk People's Republic – Following their establishment by Russian-backed separatists, both regions hosted the event for the first time in 2015. Due to the ongoing war in the region, the 2022 event was temporarily moved to the Russian-occupied city of Mariupol.

=== Other nations ===
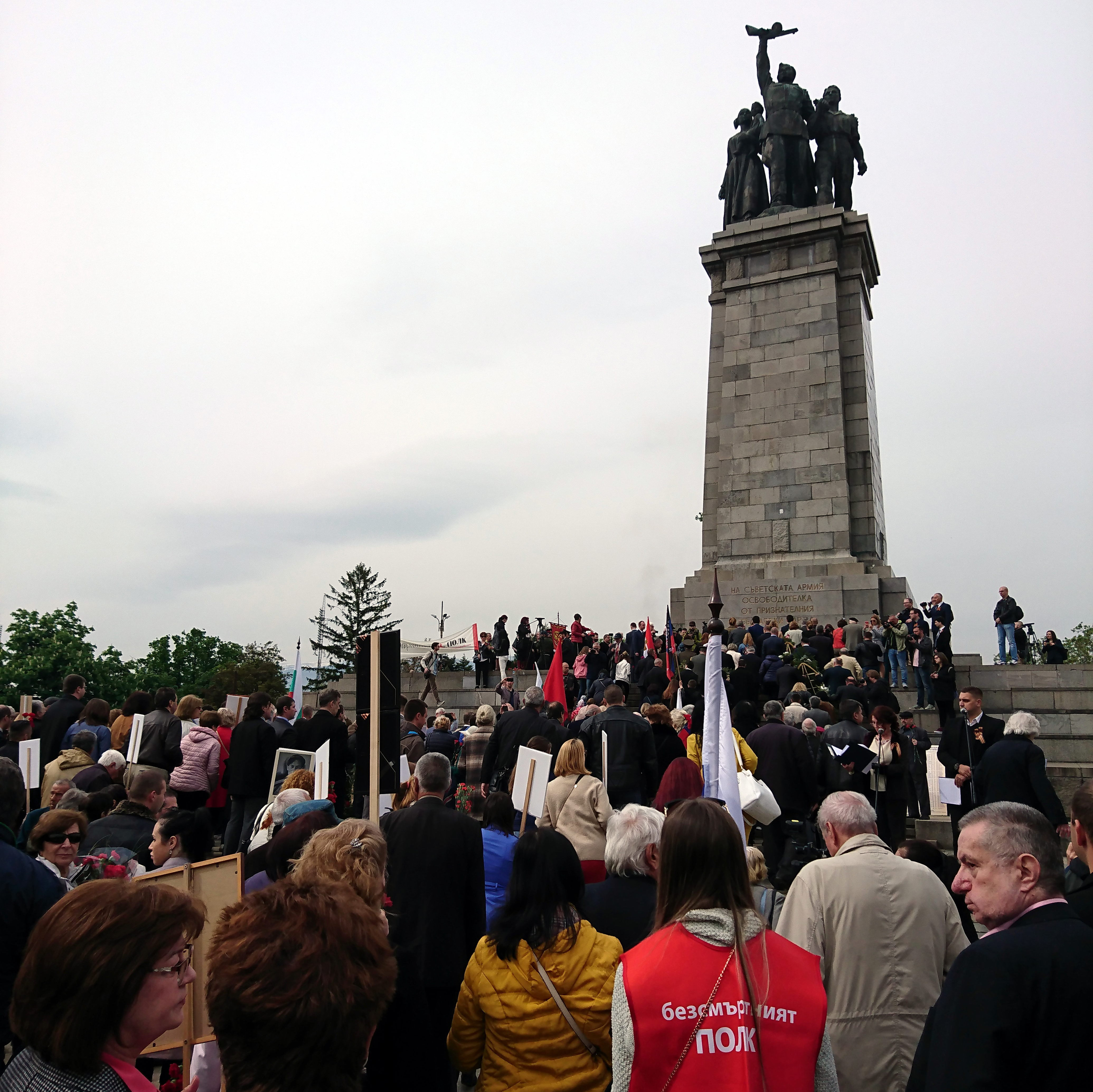
The 2019 Immortal Regiment at the Monument to the Soviet Army in Sofia

The procession is also done in the following countries:

- Albania (since 2015)
- Antarctica (since 2018)
- Argentina (since 2016)
- Australia (since 2016)
- Austria (since 2016)
- Belgium (since 2017)
- Bosnia and Herzegovina (since 2017)
- Brazil (since 2017)
- Bulgaria (since 2015)
- Burkina Faso (since 2025)
- Cambodia (since 2018)
- Canada (since 2015)
- Chile (since 2018)
- China (since 2016)
  - Hong Kong (since 2019)
- Colombia (since 2019)
- Congo (since 2017)
- Costa Rica (since 2014)
- Croatia (Note: As Besmrtni partizanski odred, lit. 'Immortal Partisan Detachment', honoring Croatian and Yugoslav Partisans.) (since 2016)
- Cuba (since 2017)
- Cyprus (since 2016)
- Czech Republic (since 2016)
- Denmark (since 2016)
- Egypt (since 2017)
- Finland (since 2015)
- France (since 2016)
- Germany (since 2015)
- Greece (since 2015)
- Hungary (since 2016)
- Iceland (since 2015)
- India (since 2015)
- Indonesia (since 2016)
- Ireland (since 2015)
- Israel (since 2014)
- Italy (since 2016)
- Japan (since 2017)
- Kuwait (since 2017)
- Lebanon (since 2015)
- Libya (since 2017)
- Luxembourg (since 2017)
- Malaysia (since 2018)
- Malta (since 2016)
- Mexico (since 2015)
- Mongolia (since 2016)
- Montenegro (since 2016)
- Morocco (since 2017)
- Nepal (since 2017)
- Netherlands (since 2014)
- New Zealand (since 2018)
- Nigeria (since 2017)
- North Korea (since 2017)
- North Macedonia (since 2016)
- Norway (since 2015)
- Oman (since 2016)
- Palestine (since 2017)
- Panama (since 2016)
- Philippines (since 2018)
- Poland (since 2014)
- Portugal (since 2017)
- Qatar (since 2016)
- Romania (since 2016)
- Serbia (since 2016)
- Slovakia (since 2016)
- Slovenia (since 2016)
- South Africa (since 2016)
- South Korea (since 2015)
- Spain (since 2016)
- Sweden (since 2016)
- Switzerland (since 2016)
- Syria (since 2018)
- Thailand (since 2016)
- Tunisia (since 2017)
- Turkey (since 2016)
- United Kingdom (since 2015)
- United States (since 2016)
- Vietnam (since 2017)
- Zambia (since 2018)

Many of the traditions and customs in Israel during Victory in Europe Day are the same as in Russia, with Immortal Regiment marches being held in cities with large populations of Red Army veterans and their descendants.

== Notable participants ==
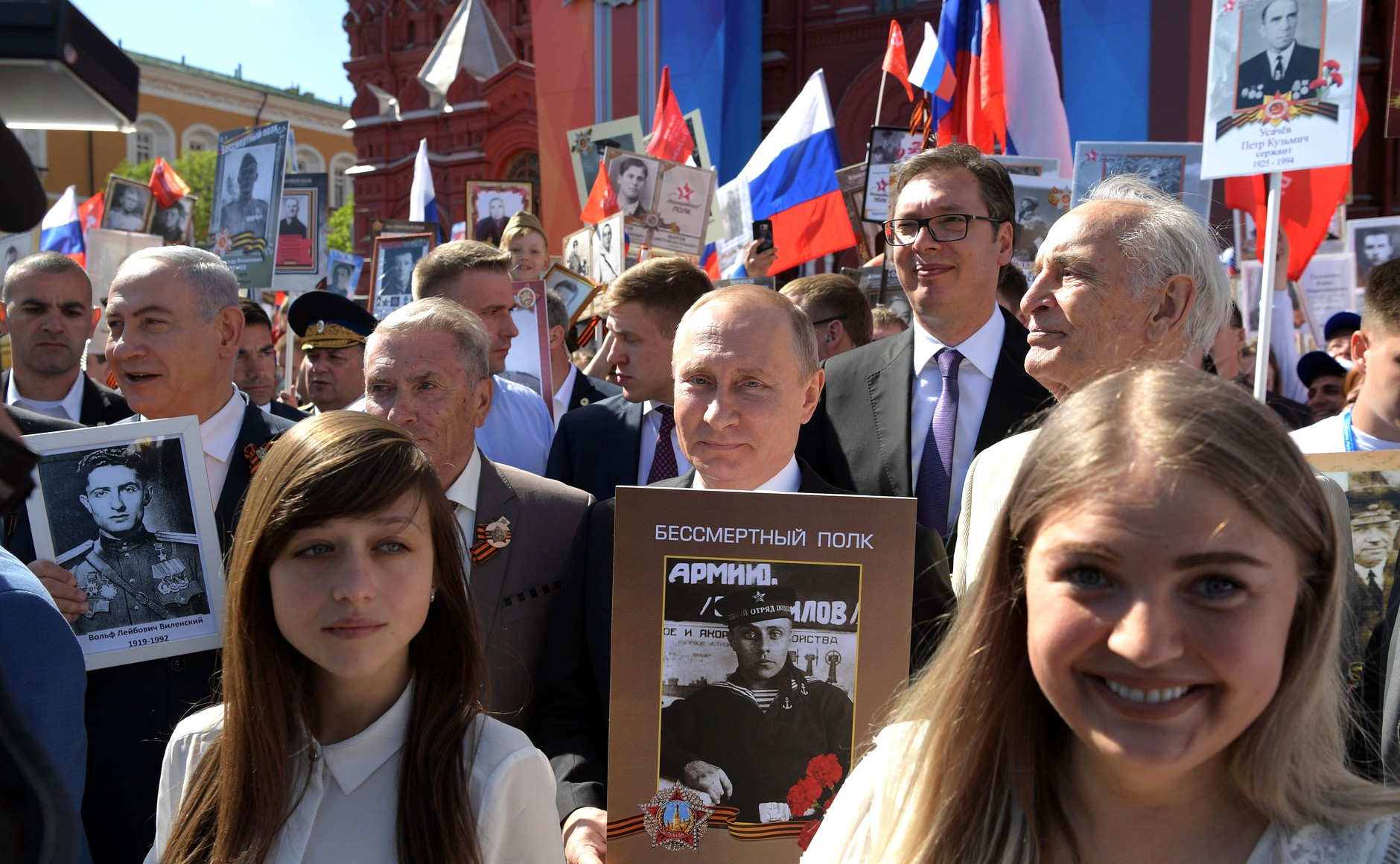
Vladimir Putin, Benjamin Netanyahu and Aleksandar Vučić at the Immortal Regiment in 2018

- Vladimir Putin, President of Russia (usually with a portrait of his father, Vladimir Spiridonovich Putin)
- Aleksandar Vučić, President of Serbia (carrying a portrait of Anđelko Vučić, his grandfather)
- Benjamin Netanyahu, Prime Minister of Israel (carrying a portrait of Hero of the Soviet Union Wolf Vilenski, who died in Israel in 1992)
- Sooronbay Jeenbekov, President of Kyrgyzstan (carrying a portrait of his grandfather Jeenbek Pirnazarov)
- Almazbek Atambayev, ex-President of Kyrgyzstan (carrying a portrait of his father Sharshen Atambayev)
- Igor Dodon, ex-President of Moldova (carrying a portrait of his grandfather George Dodon and his namesake Alexander Dodon)
- Svetlana Toma, Moldovan actress who debuted at the Moldova-Film.

== See also ==
- Minute of Silence
- Pobediteli
- Salute to America
- Time of Remembrance and Reconciliation for Those Who Lost Their Lives during the Second World War
- Victory Day Parades
