= OBD =

OBD may refer to:

- On-board diagnostics, an electronics self diagnostic system, typically used in automotive applications
- Optimal biological dose, the quantity of a radiological or pharmacological treatment that will produce the desired effect with acceptable toxicity
- Organic brain disease

== See also ==
- OBD Memorial, a project by the Ministry of Defense of the Russian Federation
