= Great Patriotic War (term) =

Soviet term for the German-Soviet part of the World War II

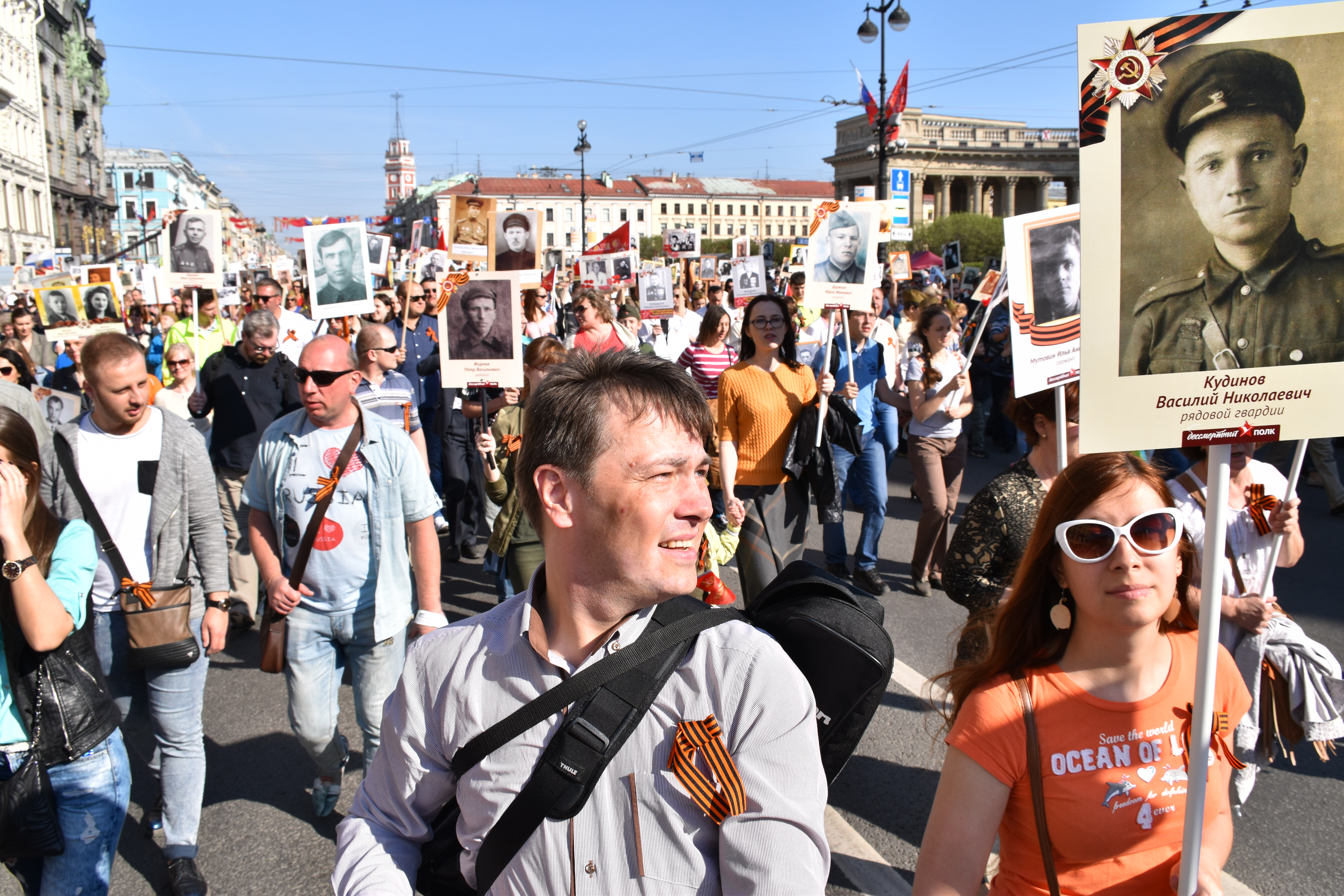
People in Saint Petersburg at the Immortal Regiment, carrying portraits of their ancestors who fought in the Great Patriotic War.

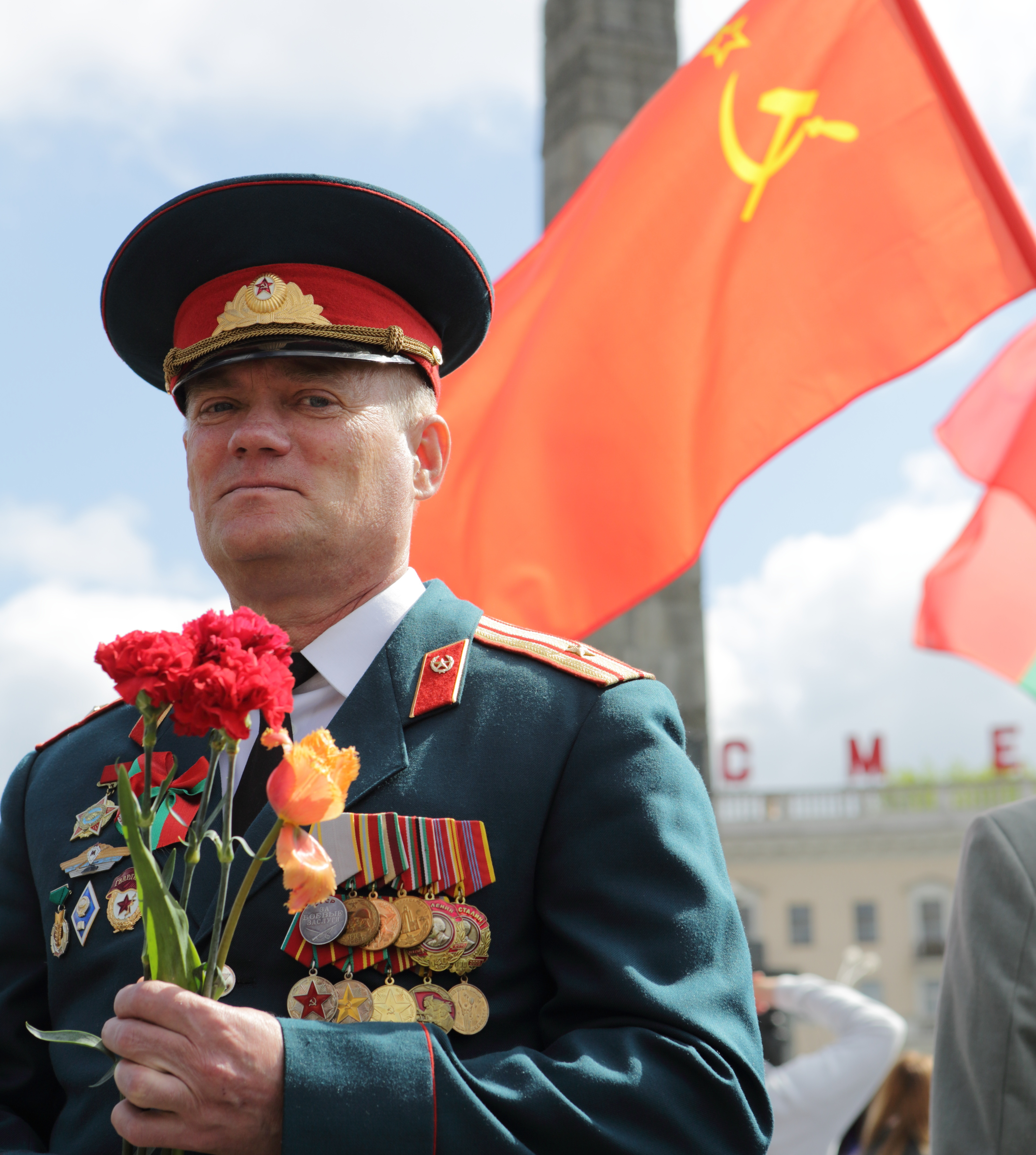
Soviet Armed Forces veteran pays tribute on Victory Day in 2014 in Minsk under the Soviet flag.

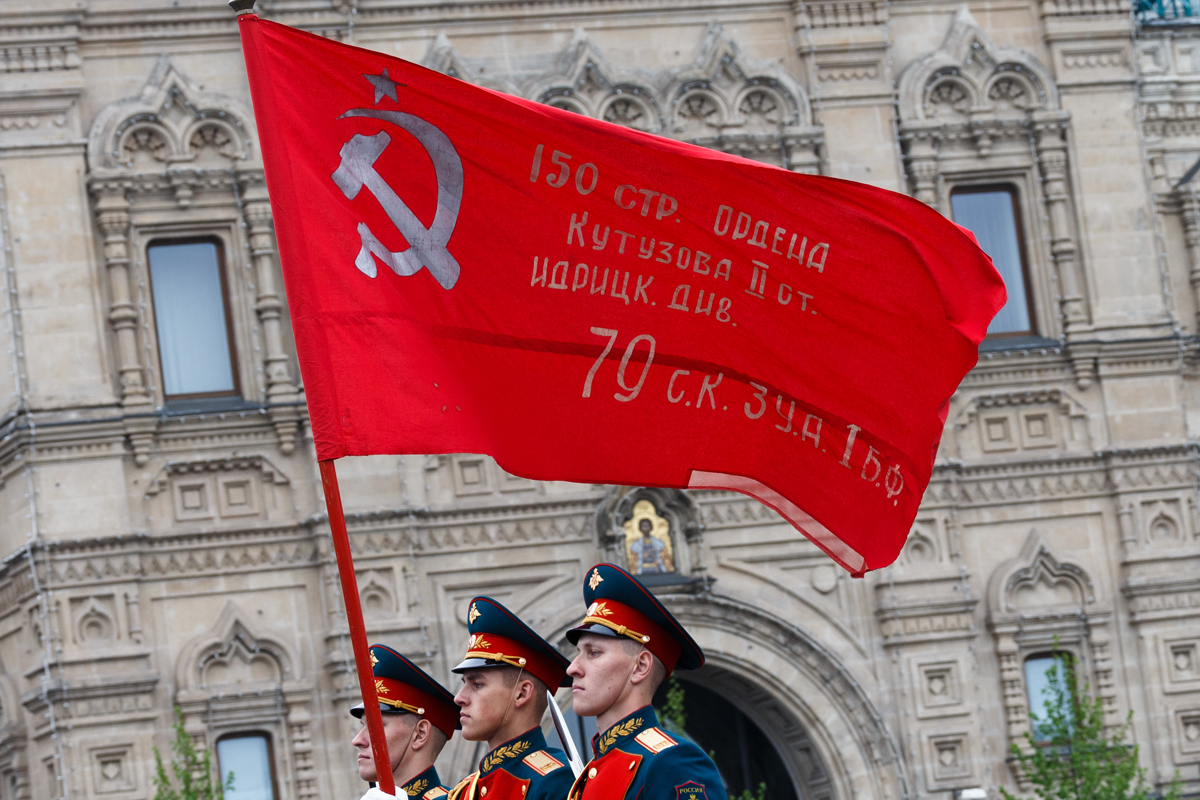
The victory banner shown during the 2019 Moscow Victory Day Parade.

The Great Patriotic War (Note: Russian: Великая Отечественная война, romanized: Velikaya Otechestvennaya voyna; Azerbaijani: Böyük Vətən müharibəsi; Belarusian: Вялікая Айчынная вайна, romanized: Vyalikaya Aychynnaya vayna; Estonian: Suur Isamaasõda; Armenian: Հայրենական Մեծ պատերազմ, romanized: Hayrenakan Mec paterazm; Georgian: დიდი სამამულო ომი/Didi samamulo omi; Kazakh: Ulı Otan soğısı; Kyrgyz: Улуу Ата Мекендик согуш, romanized: Uluu Ata Mekendik soğuş; Lithuanian: Didysis Tėvynės karas; Latvian: Lielais Tēvijas karš; Romanian: Marele Război pentru apărarea Patriei (Moldovan Cyrillic: Мареле Рэзбой пентру апэраря Патрией); Tajik: Ҷанги Бузурги Ватанӣ, romanized: Jangi Buzurgi Vataní; Turkmen: Beýik Watançylyk urşy/Beyik Watançılıq urşı; Tatar: Бөек Ватан сугышы, romanized: Böyek Watan suğışı; Ukrainian: Велика Вітчизняна війна, romanized: Velyka Vitchyznyana viyna; Uzbek: Улуғ Ватан уруши, romanized: Uluğ Vatan uruşi) is a term used in Russia (and formerly the Soviet Union) and some other post-Soviet states to describe the Eastern Front of World War II, fought primarily between the Soviet Union and Nazi Germany between 22 June 1941 and 9 May 1945. For some legal purposes, this period may be extended to 11 May 1945 to include the end of the Prague offensive.

== History ==
The term "Patriotic War" refers to Russian resistance to the French invasion of Russia under Napoleon I, which became known as the "Patriotic War of 1812". In Russian, the term "Patriotic War" (Russian: отечественная война, otechestvennaya voyna) originally referred to a war on one's own territory (otechestvo means "the fatherland"), as opposed to a campaign abroad (заграничная война), and later was reinterpreted as a war for the fatherland, i.e. a defensive war for one's homeland. Sometimes, the Patriotic War of 1812 was also referred to as the "Great Patriotic War" (Великая отечественная война); the phrase first appeared in 1844, and became popular on the eve of the centenary of the Patriotic War of 1812.

After 1914, the phrase was applied to World War I. It was the name of a special war-time appendix to the magazine Theater and Life (Театр и жизнь) in Saint Petersburg, and referred to the Eastern Front of World War I, where Russia fought against the German Empire, Austro-Hungarian Empire and Ottoman Empire. The phrases "Second Patriotic War" (Вторая отечественная война) and "Great World Patriotic War" (Великая всемирная отечественная война) were also used during World War I in Russia.

The term "Great Patriotic War" re-appeared in the newspaper Pravda on 23 June 1941, just a day after Germany invaded the Soviet Union. It was found in the title of "The Great Patriotic War of the Soviet People", a long article by Yemelyan Yaroslavsky, a member of the Pravda editors' collegium. The phrase was intended to motivate the population to defend the Soviet fatherland and to expel the invader, and a reference to the Patriotic War of 1812 was seen as a great morale booster.

During the Soviet period, historians attempted to make this history fit with the state's communist ideology, with Field Marshal Mikhail Kutuzov and General Pyotr Bagration transformed into peasant generals, Alexander I alternatively ignored or vilified, and the war becoming a massive "People's War" fought by the ordinary people of Russia, with almost no involvement on the part of the government. The invasion by Germany was called the "Great Patriotic War" by the Soviet government to evoke comparisons with the victory by Tsar Alexander I over Napoleon's invading army.

The term "Patriotic War" was officially recognized by establishment of the Order of the Patriotic War on 20 May 1942, awarded for heroic deeds.

== Usage ==
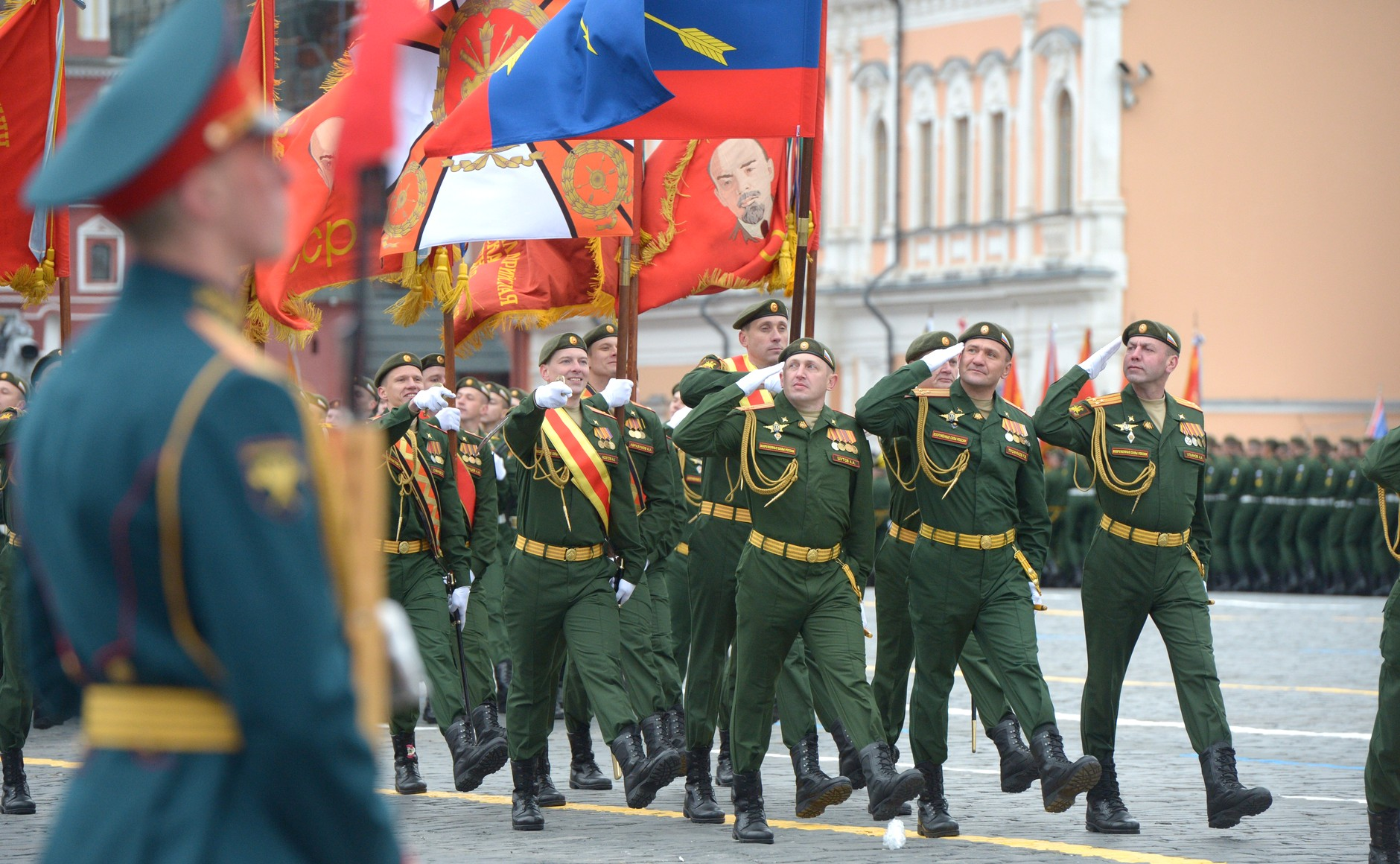
2021 Moscow Victory Day Parade. Military parades and Soviet military symbolism play an important role in the 9 May celebrations across Russia.

The term is not generally used outside the former Soviet Union and is used to refer to specifically the Eastern Front of World War II (1941–1945). The term does not cover other Soviet wars during the initial and final phases of World War II - occupation of eastern Poland (1939), the Baltic states (1940), Bessarabia and Northern Bukovina (1940), the Soviet–Finnish War (1939–1940), and the Soviet–Japanese War (1945).

In Russia and some other post-Soviet countries, the term is given great significance; it is accepted as a representation of the most important part of World War II. Until 2014, Uzbekistan was the only nation in the Commonwealth of Independent States that had not recognized the term, referring to it as World War II on the state holiday – the Day of Remembrance and Honour. Since the 2000s, the Russian government under Vladimir Putin has increasingly used the memory of the Great Patriotic War to foster national unity and justify contemporary political actions.

On 9 April 2015, the Ukrainian parliament replaced the term "Great Patriotic War (1941–1945)" (Velyka vitchyzniana viina) in the country's law with the "Second World War (1939–1945)" (Druha svitova viina), as part of a set of decommunization laws. Also in 2015, Ukraine's "Victory Day over Nazism in World War II" was established as a national holiday in accordance with the law of "On Perpetuation of Victory over Nazism in World War II 1939–1945". The new holiday was celebrated on 9 May and replaced Victory Day. In 2023, Ukraine abolished the "Victory Day over Nazism" holiday and replaced it with "Day of Remembrance and Victory over Nazism in World War II 1939 – 1945", which is celebrated on 8 May annually.

== Gallery of stamps ==
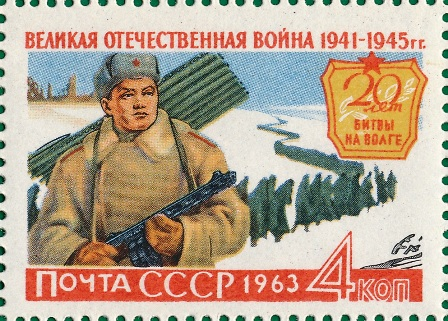
1963 Soviet stamp commemorating the 20th anniversary of the Battle of Stalingrad, with caption reading Великая Отечественная война 1941-1945гг (The Great Patriotic War 1941-1945).

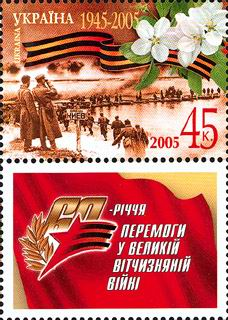
Ukrainian stamp commemorating the "60th anniversary of victory in the Great Patriotic War", 1945–2005 (Ukrainian: 60-річчя Перемоги у Великій Вітчизняній війні, lit. '60-richchia Peremohy u Velykii Vitchyznianii Viini')

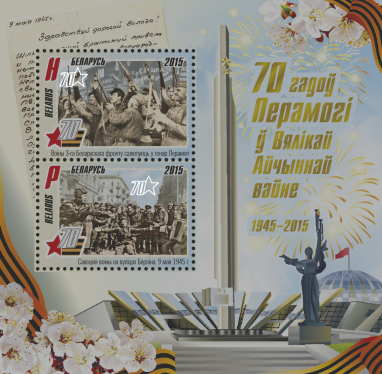
Belarusian stamps for "70 years of victory in the Great Patriotic War 1945–2015" (Belarusian: 70 hadow Peramohi w Vyalikay Aychynnay vayne 1945–2015).

== See also ==
- Operation Barbarossa
- Pobediteli
- Pobedobesie
- "The Sacred War"
- Strategic operations of the Red Army in World War II
- Names of the Second World War
