= Salute to America =

Salute to America may refer to:

- 2019 Salute to America, an event in Washington, D.C.
- 2020 Salute to America, an event in Washington, D.C.
- Salute 2 America Parade, an annual event in Atlanta, Georgia 1961–2007
