= Pobediteli =

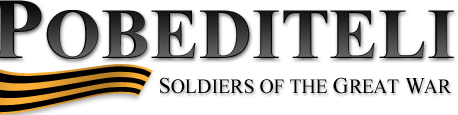
Pobediteli logo

Pobediteli (Russian: Победители, the Victors) is a free and non-profit Russian project, celebrating in 2005 the 60th anniversary of victory in World War II, with the goal of congratulating those who won the Great Patriotic War (Russian name of the Eastern Front of World War II) for the Soviet Union. The project is aimed at attracting attention to surviving soldiers who fought for the Soviet Union.

Its website contains a multimedia flash presentation covering the entire period of the war, beginning with the German invasion of the USSR on 22 June 1941 and ending with the unconditional surrender of Germany on 8 May 1945, marking the end of the war in Europe, and is intended to educate people about the major events of the war.

The project was the 2005 winner of the UN World Summit Award in the category "e-Culture and Heritage".

== See also ==
- Ribbon of Saint George
- OBD Memorial
