= Elena Tsunaeva =

Russian politician

- Елена Цунаева
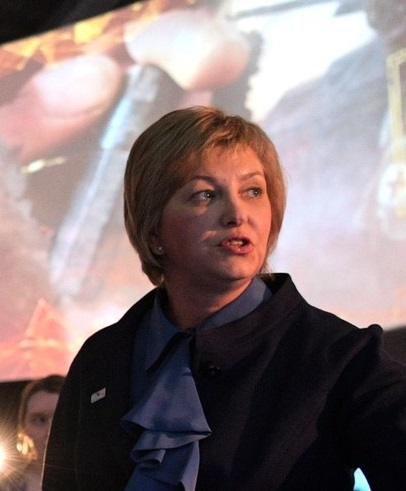

Deputy of the 8th State Duma
- Incumbent
- Assumed office 19 September 2021

Personal details
- Born: 13 January 1969 (age 57) Volgograd, Russian Soviet Federative Socialist Republic, USSR
- Party: United Russia
- Education: Volgograd State University

Elena Tsunaeva (Russian: Елена Моисеевна Цунаева; born 13 January 1969, Volgograd) is a Russian political figure and a deputy of the 8th State Duma.

== Biography ==
In 2010, Tsunaeva was granted a Candidate of Sciences in History degree. For 18 years, from 1992 to 2010, she worked as a teacher at schools and institutes of the Volgograd Oblast. Starting from the 1980-s she has been engaged in field search expeditions to search for and reburial the remains of Soviet soldiers. Tsunaeva even co-founded the Volgograd public organization titled "Poisk" (English: Search). In 2000, she became a researcher at the Research Institute for Problems of the Economic History of Russia in the 20th Century of the Volgograd State University. In 2015, she joined the organizational committee of the Immortal Regiment movement. In 2017, she became a member of the Civic Chamber of the Russian Federation. On 29 November 2018 she was elected one of five co-chairs of the All-Russia People's Front. Since September 2021, she has served as deputy of the 8th State Duma.

=== Sanctions ===
She was sanctioned by the UK government in 2022 in relation to the Russo-Ukrainian War.
