= Names of World War II =

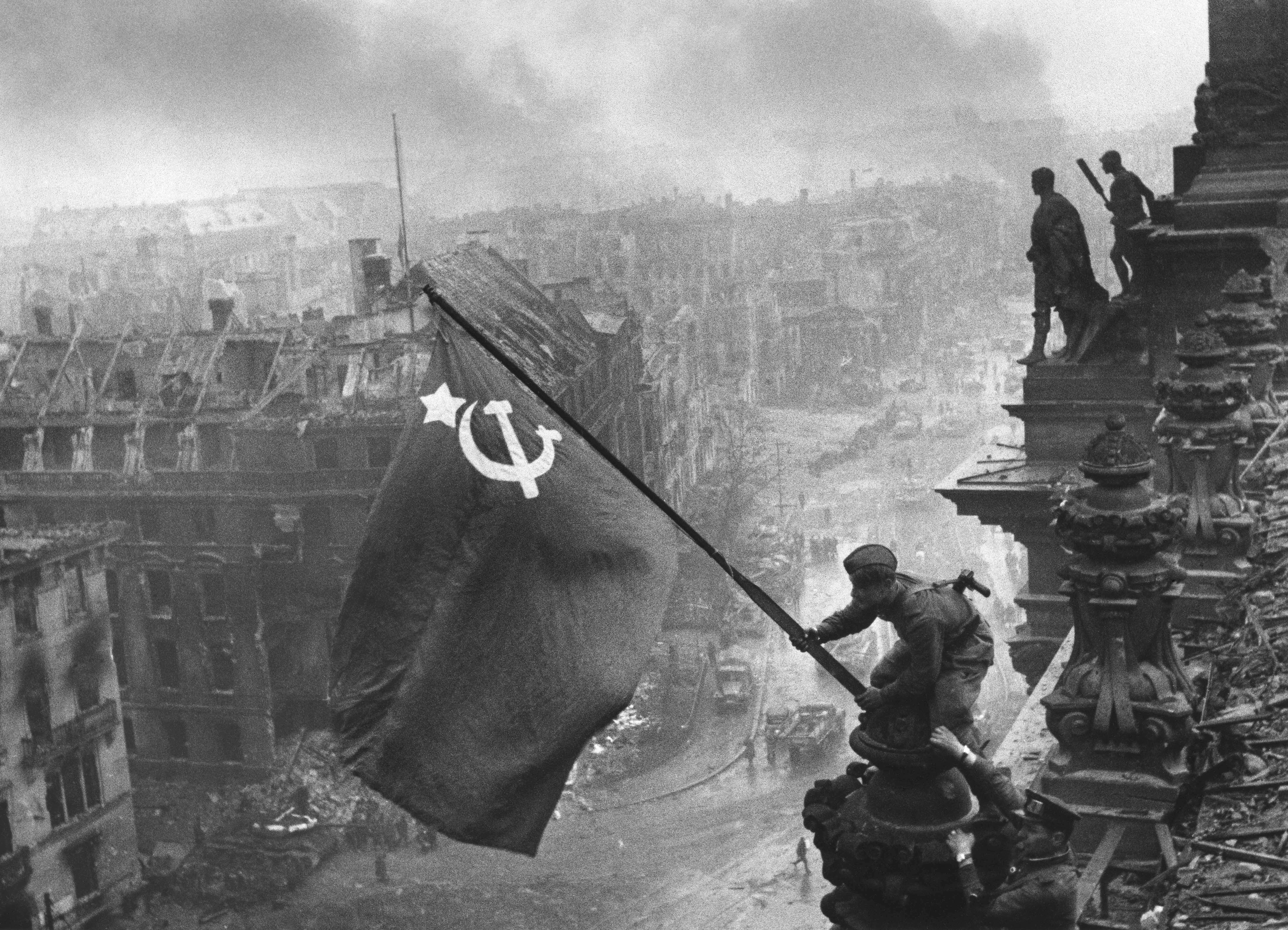
A Soviet soldier raising the flag during the Battle of Berlin, part of the Eastern Front, which is known as the Great Patriotic War in the Soviet Union and modern-day Russia

The global conflict that took place between September 1939 and September 1945 is generally referred to as World War II or the Second World War, (Note: Also abbreviated as WW2 and WWII.) the former being commonly used in the United States. Before the attack on Pearl Harbor, the conflict was sometimes called the Second Great War – a reference to the Great War of 1914–1918, which was later renamed World War I – and the European War following Germany's invasion of the Soviet Union in June 1941. Official United States documents adopted the name World War II, though the term only gained popularity after the US declared war on Japan on 8 December 1941. The name eventually became popular among media outlets and was later officially adopted by the public. The conflict was officially established as World War II in the US when President Harry S. Truman approved the term.

In addition to the generally used names, specific terms for different fronts are used for historical purposes, memorials, and wartime propaganda. These include the Great Patriotic War, used by the Soviet Union for the Eastern Front against Nazi Germany, and the Greater East Asia War, used by Imperial Japan for the Pacific War.

== Common names ==
=== Second World War ===
The earliest recorded usage of the term Second World War appeared just two years after the First World War ended. It was used by British soldier and author Charles à Court Repington; although he did not name a specific ongoing conflict, he referred to the Great War as the "First World War" in the belief that other global wars would follow. He wrote in his book The First World War, "I have called this great war the First World War because I believed it to be the first of a series of world wars."

On 3 September 1939, the day Britain declared war on Germany following the invasion of Poland, the newspaper The Times became the first in the world to refer to the conflict as the Second World War, stating: "The Second World War broke out yesterday". Following this, British media and official documents widely adopted the term.

=== World War II ===
Ten days after the declaration of war by Britain and France, Time became the first American magazine to call the conflict World War II, publishing the statement: "World War II began last week when Britain and France declared war on Germany."

In June 1941, US official documents named the ongoing European conflict "World War II" when Germany invaded the Soviet Union. On 8 December 1941, when the US declared war on Japan, President Franklin D. Roosevelt publicly referred to the conflict as World War II. From 1942 to 1945, it was widely conceived as a global war against fascism in English-speaking countries, including the United Kingdom and the United States. In September 1945, just days after Japan surrendered, President Harry S. Truman approved the use of "World War II" in government documents.

== Eastern Front ==
=== Great Patriotic War ===
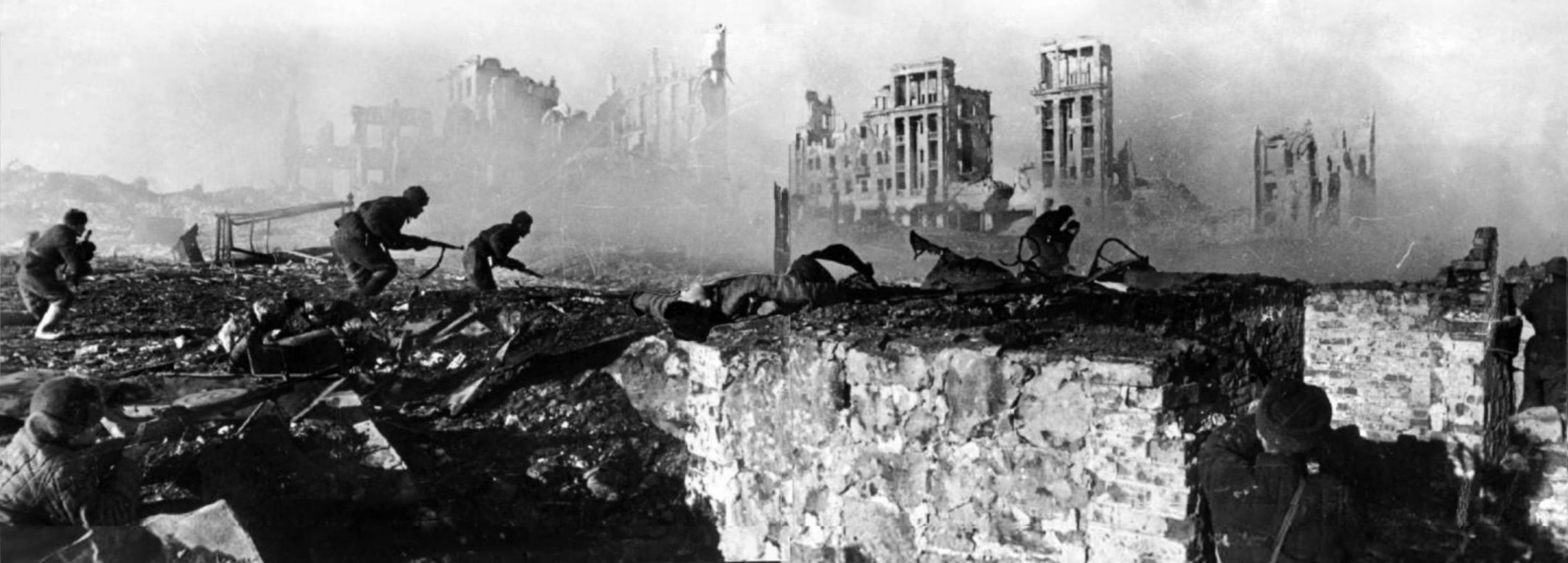
Soviet soldiers at the Battle of Stalingrad

In the Soviet Union and contemporary Russia, the term Great Patriotic War refers to the four-year war between the Soviet Union and Nazi Germany during the Second World War. The roots of the term lie in the 1812 French invasion of Russia, which Russians called the 'Patriotic War'. The term was also used during World War I when the Russian Empire fought the German Empire, the Austro-Hungarian Empire, and the Ottoman Empire.

On 23 June 1941, one day after the Germans invaded the Soviet Union, the newspaper Pravda first used the term in an article titled "The Great Patriotic War of the Soviet People" by Yemelyan Yaroslavsky. The term was chosen to motivate the Soviet people and promote defense against the invader. After the war in Europe ended, the term was mostly used within the Soviet Union and rarely mentioned elsewhere. In the 21st century, Russia and other post-Soviet nations continue to use the term. However, in 2014, Uzbekistan became the first post-Soviet nation to stop recognizing the term, designating World War II as the official name.

=== German–Soviet War ===
The term German–Soviet War (or Nazi–Soviet War) is mostly used in modern-day Germany and Ukraine to refer to the war on the Eastern Front. Historians such as John Erickson (in The Road to Stalingrad and The Road to Berlin) and David M. Glantz use the term in most of their works. The BBC and The National WWII Museum also occasionally use this term.

== Pacific War ==
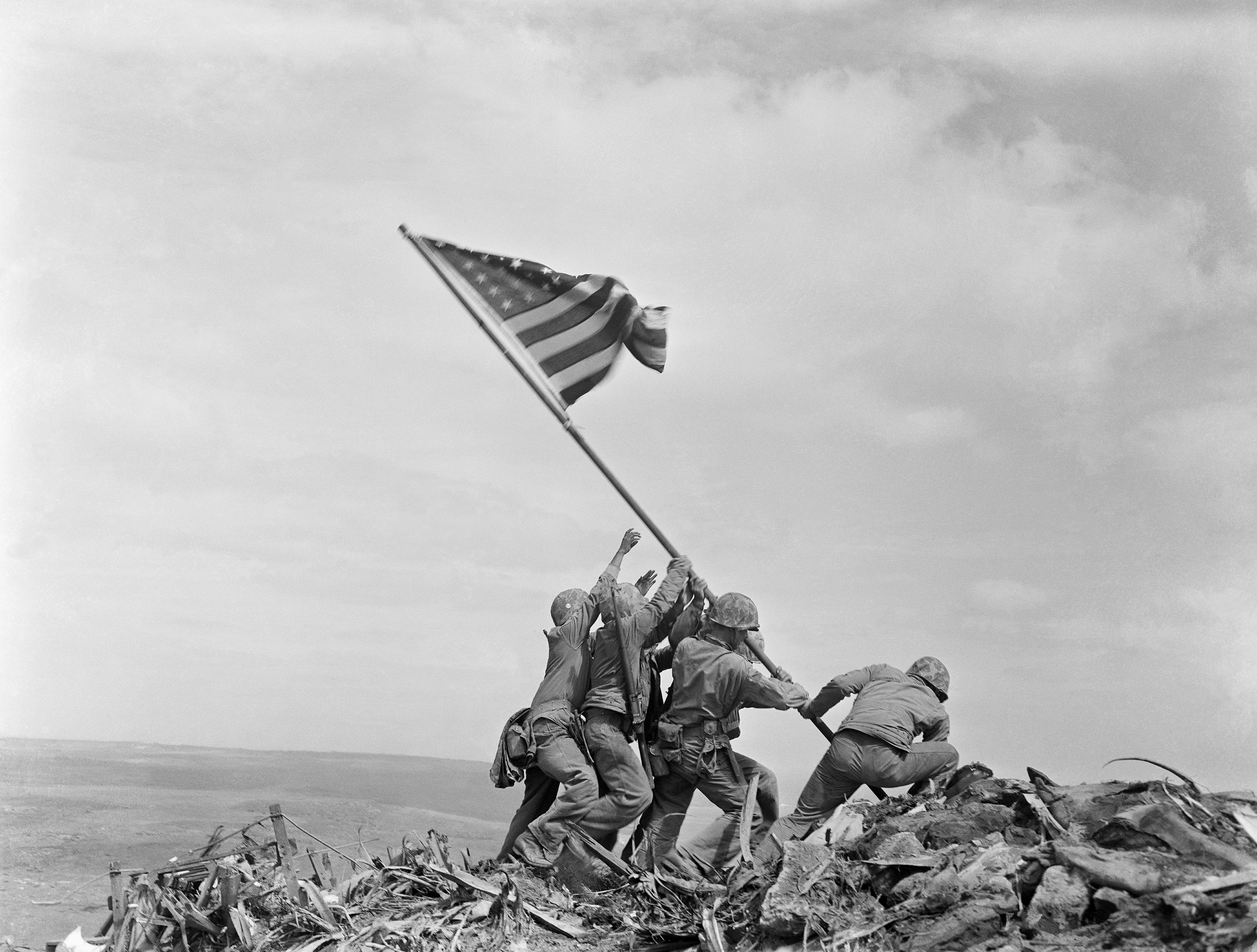
US Marines raising the flag during the Battle of Iwo Jima

Most Allied nations did not commonly distinguish the Pacific War from the Second World War, simply calling it the War Against Japan. In the United States, terms like the War in the Pacific, Asia-Pacific War, Pacific-Asian Theater, and Pacific Theater were widely used.

Japanese official documents published on 12 December 1941 used the name Greater East Asian War after the attack on Pearl Harbor to include the ongoing wars between the Western Allies and China. The term was prohibited during the Allied occupation of Japan from 1945 to 1952. Another term is the China Incident, which the Japanese government used to avoid declaring war before 7 December 1941.

In China, the war is called the War of Resistance Against Japan or the Eight-Year War of Resistance, though these terms refer to the Second Sino-Japanese War, which by definition is different from the Pacific War. (Note: China and Japan had been fighting for four years alone. After the events of 7 December 1941, which brought the United States and its allies into the war against Japan, it was widely accepted that the Pacific War began on 7 December 1941.) Other names like the Far East War and War in the East were also used in Britain and the Commonwealth.

=== Second Sino-Japanese War ===
Names of the Second Sino-Japanese War

Chinese name
- Traditional Chinese: 抗日戰爭
- Simplified Chinese: 抗日战争
- Literal meaning: War of Resistance against Japanese Aggression
Transcriptions
Standard Mandarin
- Hanyu Pinyin: kàng rì zhàn zhēng
- Bopomofo: ㄎㄤˋ ㄖˋ ㄓㄢˋ ㄓㄥ

Alternative name
- Traditional Chinese: 抗戰
- Simplified Chinese: 抗战
- Literal meaning: War of Resistance
Transcriptions
Standard Mandarin
- Hanyu Pinyin: kàng zhàn

Second alternative Chinese name
- Traditional Chinese: 八年抗戰
- Simplified Chinese: 八年抗战
- Literal meaning: Eight Years' War of Resistance
Transcriptions
Standard Mandarin
- Hanyu Pinyin: bā nián kàng zhàn

Third alternative Chinese name
- Traditional Chinese: 十四年抗戰
- Simplified Chinese: 十四年抗战
- Literal meaning: Fourteen Years' War of Resistance
Transcriptions
Standard Mandarin
- Hanyu Pinyin: shí sì nián kàng zhàn

Fourth alternative Chinese name
- Traditional Chinese: 第二次中日戰爭
- Simplified Chinese: 第二次中日战争
- Literal meaning: Second Sino-Japanese War
Transcriptions
Standard Mandarin
- Hanyu Pinyin: dì èr cì zhōng rì zhàn zhēng

Fifth alternative Chinese name
- Traditional Chinese: (日本)侵華戰爭
- Simplified Chinese: (日本)侵华战争
- Literal meaning: (Japanese) War of Aggression against China
Transcriptions
Standard Mandarin
- Hanyu Pinyin: (rì běn) qīn huá zhàn zhēng

Japanese name
- Kanji: 支那事変; 日支戦争; 日中戦争
- Hiragana: しなじへん; にっしせんそう; にっちゅうせんそう
- Katakana: シナジヘン; ニッシセンソウ; ニッチュウセンソウ
Transcriptions
- Romanization: Shina jihen; Nisshi sensō; Nicchū sensō
- Kunrei-shiki: Sina zihen; Nissi sensou; Nittyuu sensou

==== Chinese ====
In both China's Mainland and Taiwan, the war is most commonly known as the "War of Resistance against Japanese Aggression" (simplified Chinese: 抗日战争; traditional Chinese: 抗日戰爭), and the name of it is usually shortened to "Resistance against Japanese Aggression" (抗日) or the "War of Resistance" (抗战; 抗戰). The countries also use the term "Eight Years' War of Resistance" (八年抗战; 八年抗戰), a traditional view which dates the war's beginning to the Marco Polo Bridge incident in 1937.

Since 2017, the Chinese Communist Party's official view of Chinese historiography has held the 18 September 1931 Japanese invasion of Manchuria as the start of the" Fourteen Years' War of Resistance" (十四年抗战; 十四年抗戰). The 1931–1937 period is viewed as the "partial" war, which includes the "Northeast War of Resistance" (东北抗战), while 1937–1945 is viewed as a period of "total" war. This view of a fourteen-year war has political significance because it provides more recognition, internationally as China claims it fought the earliest and longest in a global war, and domestically for the role of northeast China in the War of Resistance. The CCP officially calls the conflict as "Chinese People's War of Resistance against Japanese Aggression" (Chinese: 中国人民抗日战争), while referring to it as part of the "World Anti-Fascist War", an alternate definition of World War II.

==== Japanese ====
In contemporary Japan, the name "Japan–China War" (Japanese: 日中戦争, romanized: Nitchū Sensō) is most commonly used because of its perceived objectivity. Dating the beginning of the war may also vary in Japanese context, with one Japanese historiographical view regarding the war as a "Fifteen-Year War" (Jyugonen Sensô), covering the period beginning with the invasion of Manchuria through the atomic bombings, and including both the war in China and the Pacific war.

When the invasion of China proper began in earnest in July 1937 near Beijing, the Empire of Japan used "The North China Incident" (北支事變/華北事變, Hokushi Jihen/Kahoku Jihen), and with the outbreak of the Battle of Shanghai the following month, it was changed to "The China Incident" (支那事變, Shina Jihen). The word "incident" (事變, jihen) was used by Japan, as neither country had made a formal declaration of war at the outbreak of hostility. From the Japanese perspective, localizing these conflicts was beneficial in preventing intervention from other countries, particularly the United Kingdom and the United States, which were its primary source of petroleum and steel respectively. A formal expression of these conflicts would potentially lead to an American embargo in accordance with the Neutrality Acts of the 1930s. In addition, due to China's fractured political status, Japan often claimed that China was no longer a recognizable political entity on which war could be declared.

In Japanese propaganda, the invasion of China became a holy war (聖戦, seisen), the first step of the "eight corners of the world under one roof" slogan (八紘一宇, Hakkō ichiu). In 1940, Japanese prime minister Fumimaro Konoe launched the Taisei Yokusankai. When both sides formally declared war in December 1941, the name was replaced by "Greater East Asia War" (大東亞戰爭, Daitōa Sensō).

Although the Japanese government still uses the term "China Incident" in formal documents, the word Shina is considered derogatory by China and therefore the media in Japan often paraphrase with other expressions like "The Japan–China Incident" (日華事變/日支事變, Nikka Jiken/Nisshi Jiken), which were used by media as early as the 1930s. The name "Second Sino-Japanese War" is not commonly used in Japan as the China it fought a war against in 1894 to 1895 was led by the Qing dynasty, and thus is called the Qing-Japanese War (日清戦争, Nisshin–Sensō), rather than the First Sino-Japanese War.

== See also ==
- Names of the Holocaust
- Names of the American Civil War
