= Names of the American Civil War =

Names used to refer to the American Civil War

The most common name for the American Civil War in modern American usage is simply "The Civil War". Although rarely used during the war, the term "War Between the States" became widespread afterward in the Southern United States. During and immediately after the war, Northern historians often used the terms "War of the Rebellion" or "The Great Rebellion", and the Confederate term was "War for Southern Independence", which regained some currency in the 20th century but has since fallen out of use. The name "Slaveholders' Rebellion" was used by Frederick Douglass and appeared in newspaper articles during that era. "Freedom War" is used to celebrate the war's effect of ending slavery in the United States.

During the Jim Crow era of the 1950s, the term "War of Northern Aggression" developed under the Lost Cause of the Confederacy movement by Southern historical revisionists or negationists. This label was coined by segregationists in an effort to equate contemporary efforts to end segregation with 19th-century efforts to abolish slavery.

Several names also exist for the forces on each side. The Union practice was to name their armies for the river valleys where they initially operated, while the Confederacy generally used state names. For example, the Army of the Tennessee was a Union army named for the river, while the Army of Tennessee was a Confederate army, named for the state. The opposing forces named battles differently as well. The Union forces frequently named battles for bodies of water that were prominent on or near the battlefield, but Confederates most often used the name of the nearest town.

== Enduring names ==
=== Civil War ===
In the United States, "Civil War" is the most common term for the conflict and has been used by the overwhelming majority of reference books, scholarly journals, dictionaries, encyclopedias, popular histories, and mass media in the United States since the early 20th century. The National Park Service, the government organization entrusted by the United States Congress to preserve the battlefields of the war, uses this term. Writings of prominent men such as Jefferson Davis, Robert E. Lee, Ulysses S. Grant, William Tecumseh Sherman, P. G. T. Beauregard, Nathan Bedford Forrest, and Judah P. Benjamin used the term "Civil War" during the conflict. Abraham Lincoln used it on multiple occasions.

Outside the United States, historians writing in the English language usually refer to the conflict as the "American Civil War". Such variations are also used in the United States if the war might otherwise be confused with another civil war such as the English Civil War, the Russian Civil War, or the Spanish Civil War.

=== War Between the States ===
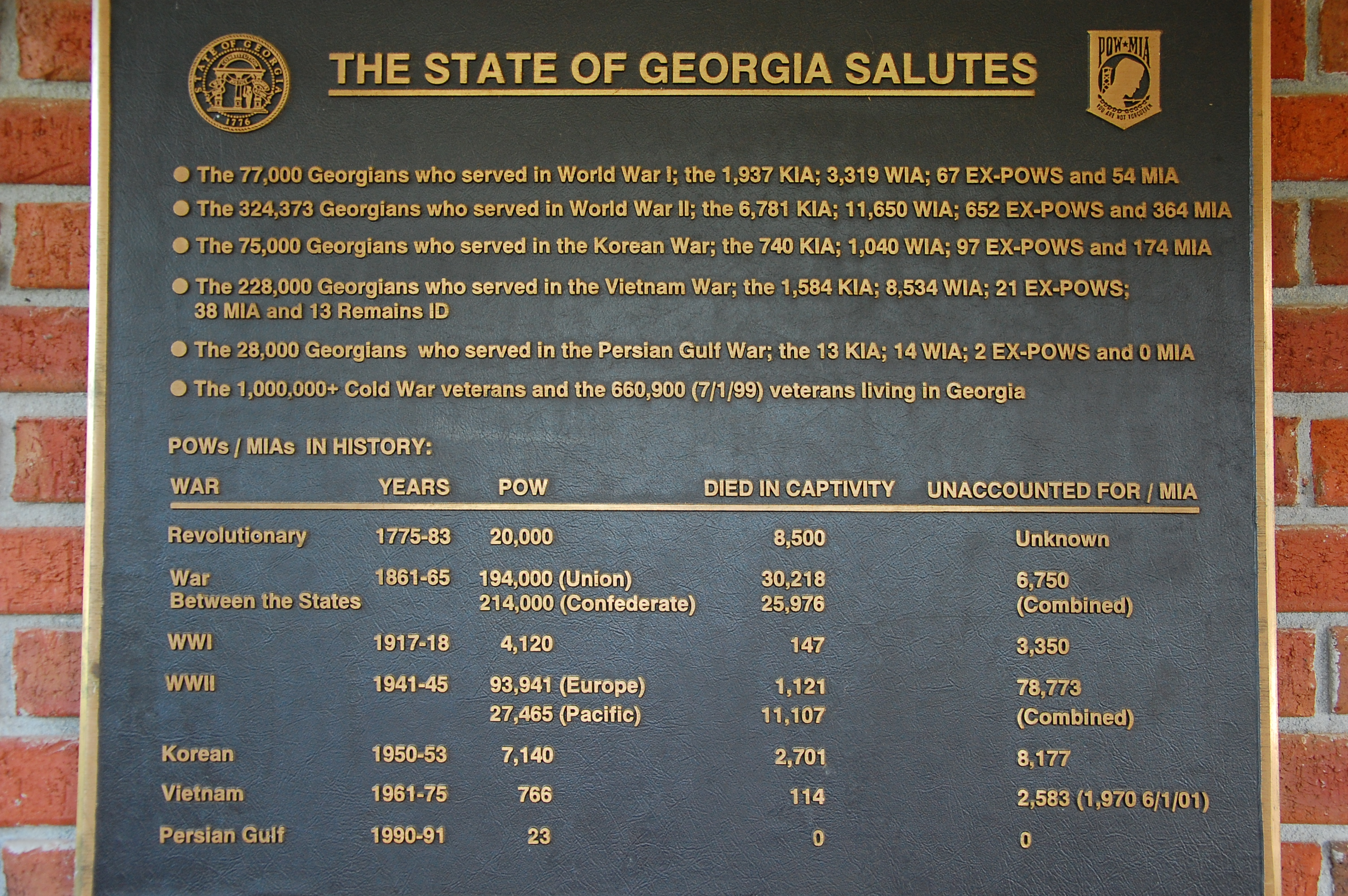
Georgia plaque using "War Between the States"

The term "War Between the States" was rarely used during the war but became prevalent afterward among proponents of the "Lost Cause" interpretation of the war.

The Confederate government avoided the term "civil war", which assumes both combatants to be part of a single country, and so referred to it in official documents as the "War between the Confederate States of America and the United States of America". European diplomacy produced a similar formula for avoiding the phrase "civil war". Queen Victoria's proclamation of British neutrality referred to "hostilities ... between the Government of the United States of America and certain States styling themselves the Confederate States of America".

After the war, the memoirs of former Confederate officials and veterans (Joseph E. Johnston, Raphael Semmes, and especially Alexander Stephens) commonly used the term "War Between the States". In 1898, the United Confederate Veterans formally endorsed the name. In the early 20th century, the United Daughters of the Confederacy (UDC) led a campaign to promote the term "War Between the States" in the media and public schools. UDC efforts to convince the US Congress to adopt the term began in 1913 but were unsuccessful. Congress has never adopted an official name for the war. The name "War Between the States" is inscribed on the USMC War Memorial at Arlington National Cemetery. The name was personally ordered by Lemuel C. Shepherd Jr., the 20th Commandant of the Marine Corps.

A sheet of the US postage stamps from 1994

American president Franklin D. Roosevelt referred to the Civil War as "the four-year War Between the States". References to the "War Between the States" appear occasionally in federal and state court documents, including in Justice Harry Blackmun's landmark opinion in Roe v. Wade.

The names "Civil War" and "War Between the States" have been used jointly in some formal contexts. For example, to mark the war's centenary in the 1960s, the State of Georgia created the "Georgia Civil War Centennial Commission Commemorating the War Between the States". In 1994, the US Postal Service issued a series of commemorative stamps, "The Civil War: The War Between the States".

== Historical terms in the United States ==
=== War of the Rebellion ===
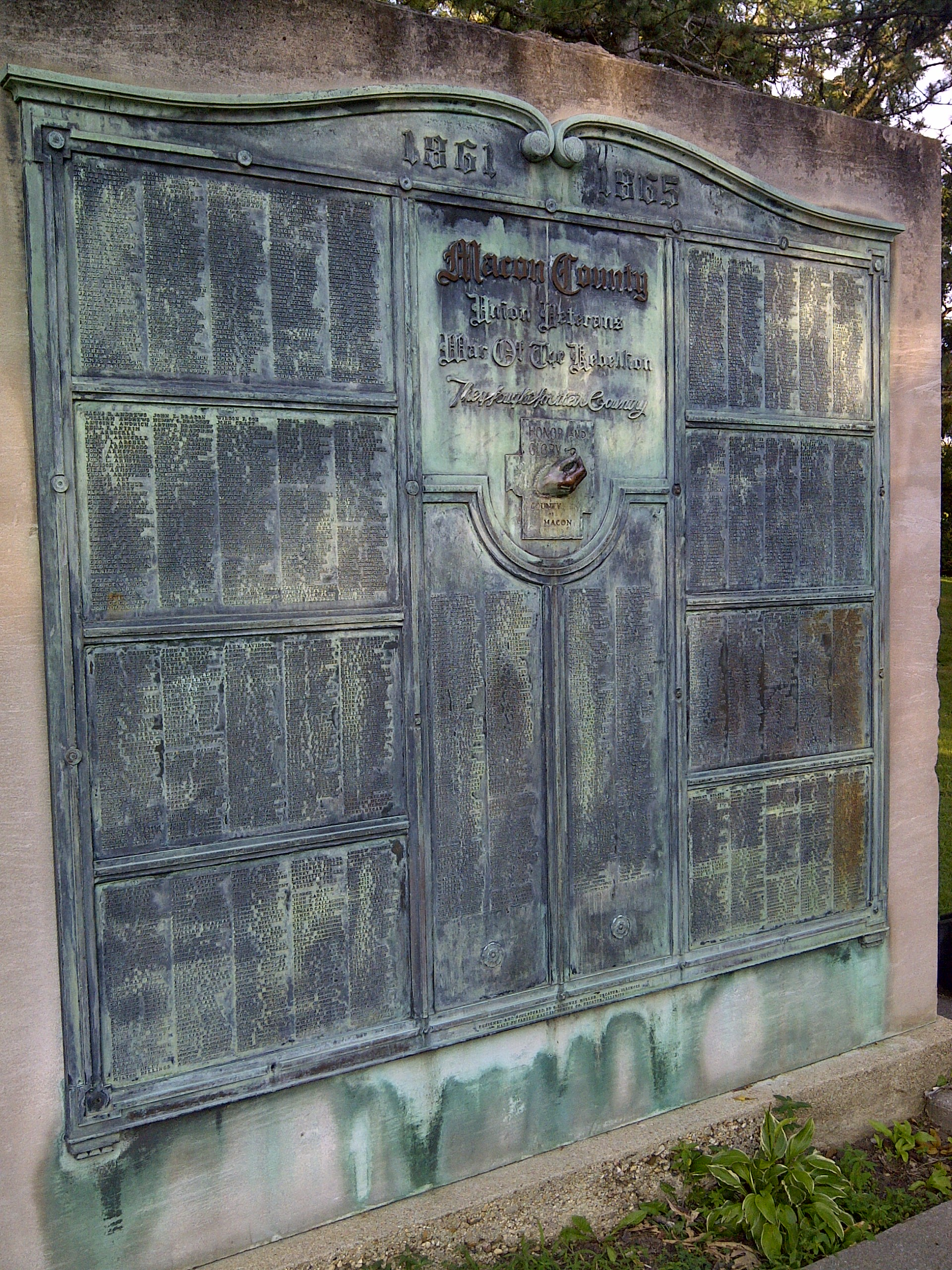
Macon County, Illinois plaque listing 2,486 soldiers and sailors that died denoting it as the "War of the Rebellion"

During and immediately after the war, US officials, Southern Unionists, and pro-Union writers often referred to Confederates as "Rebels". The earliest histories published in the northern states commonly refer to the war as "the Great Rebellion" or "the War of the Rebellion", as do many war monuments, hence the nicknames Johnny Reb (and Billy Yank) for the participants.

Abolitionist Frederick Douglass delivered a speech entitled "The Slaveholders' Rebellion" on July 4, 1862, in Himrod, New York, and John Harvey wrote The slaveholders' rebellion, and the downfall of slavery in America in 1865.

The official US war records refer to the war as the "War of the Rebellion". The records were compiled by the US War Department in a 127-volume collection, The War of the Rebellion: a Compilation of the Official Records of the Union and Confederate Armies, which was published from 1881 to 1901. Historians commonly refer to the collection as the Official Records of the Union and Confederate Armies.

=== War of Separation/Secession ===
"War of Separation" was occasionally used by people in the Confederacy during the war. In most Romance languages, the words used to refer to the war translate literally to "War of Secession" (French: Guerre de Sécession, Italian: Guerra di secessione, Spanish: Guerra de Secesión, Portuguese: Guerra de Secessão, Romanian: Războiul de Secesiune), a name that is also used in Central and Eastern Europe: Sezessionskrieg is commonly used in German, and Wojna secesyjna is used in Polish. Walt Whitman called it the "War of Secession" or the "Secession War" in his prose.

== War for Southern Independence/The War of Northern Aggression ==
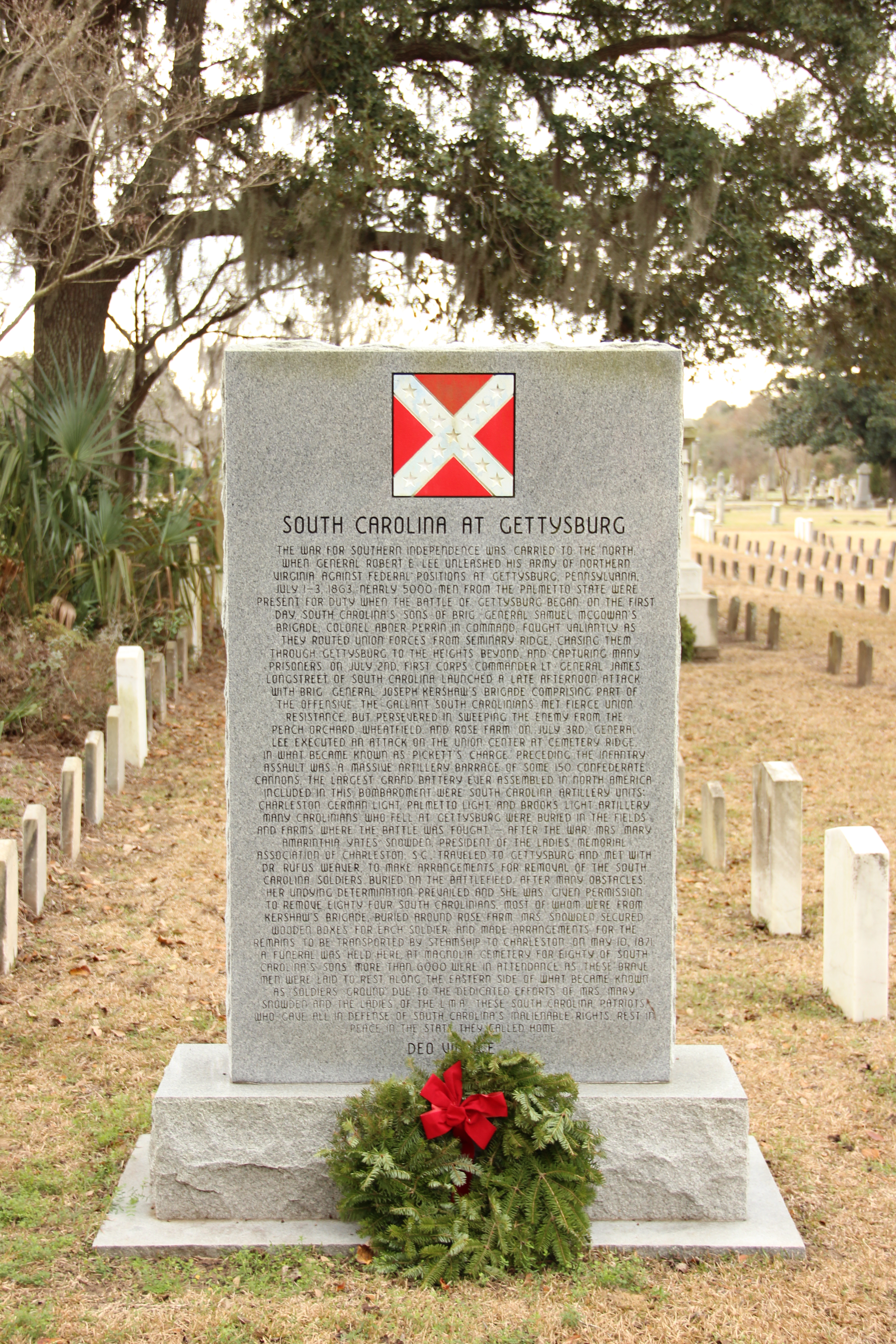
"War for Southern Independence" used at a Confederate burial site in Magnolia Cemetery in Charleston, South Carolina.

The names "War for Southern Independence" or "The War of Northern Aggression" and their variations are used by some Southerners to refer to the war. That terminology aims to parallel usage of the American Revolutionary War. While popular on the Confederate side during the war (Stonewall Jackson regularly referred to the war as the "second war for independence"), the term lost popularity in the immediate aftermath of the Confederacy's defeat and its failure to gain independence. The term resurfaced slightly in the late 20th century.

A popular poem published in the early stages of hostilities was South Carolina. Its prologue referred to the war as the "Third War for Independence" since it named the War of 1812 as the second such war. On November 8, 1860, the Charleston Mercury, a contemporary southern newspaper, stated, "The tea has been thrown overboard. The Revolution of 1860 has been initiated."

In the 1920s, the historian Charles A. Beard used the term "Second American Revolution" to emphasize the changes brought on by the Union's victory. The term is still used by the Sons of Confederate Veterans organization but with the intent to represent the Confederacy's racist and slave-owning cause positively.

=== War for the Union ===
Some Southern Unionists and northerners used "The War for the Union", the title of a December 1861 lecture by the abolitionist leader Wendell Phillips.

Ordeal of the Union, a major eight-volume history published from 1947 to 1971 by the historian and journalist (Joseph) Allan Nevins, emphasizes the Union in the first volume's title, which also came to name the series. Because Nevins earned the Bancroft, Scribner, and National Book Award Prizes for books in his Ordeal of the Union series, his title may have been influential. However, the fourth volume is titled Prologue to Civil War, 1859–1861, and the next four volumes use "War" in their titles. The sixth volume, War Becomes Revolution, 1862–1863, picks up on that earlier thread in naming the conflict, but Nevins neither viewed Southern secession as revolutionary nor supported Southern apologist attempts to link the war with the American Revolution of 1775–1783.

=== War of Northern/Yankee Aggression ===
The name "War of Northern Aggression" has been used to indicate the Union as the belligerent party in the war. The name arose during the Jim Crow era of the 1950s when it was coined by segregationists who tried to equate contemporary efforts to end segregation with 19th-century efforts to abolish slavery. The name has been criticized by historians such as James M. McPherson, as the Confederacy "took the initiative by seceding in defiance of an election of a president by a constitutional majority" and "started the war by firing on the American flag".

Since the free states and most non-Yankee groups (Germans, Dutch-Americans, New York Irish and southern-leaning settlers in Ohio, Indiana, and Illinois) showed opposition to waging the Civil War, other Confederate sympathizers have used the name "War of Yankee Aggression" to indicate the Civil War as a Yankee war, not a Northern war per se.

Conversely, the "War of Southern Aggression" has been sometimes used to emphasize the Confederacy's status as the belligerent party, in particular the Confederacy starting the war by initiating combat at Fort Sumter. According to other historians Clyde Wilson, the Southern states were acting defensively, protecting their people, property, and self-government from perceived Northern aggression. He frames Fort Sumter not as an unprovoked act of rebellion but as a situation that could have been resolved through negotiation. He emphasizes that the incident involved no casualties initially, the Union garrison was allowed to leave with honor, and the bombardment had precedents in constitutional dispute rather than foreign-style surprise attack. He argues that Lincoln and the U.S. federal government treated the event as a justification for war, using the crisis to mobilize forces for what Wilson views as Northern partisan and economic interests, rather than a purely defensive stance aimed at preserving the Union. In this reading, Fort Sumter itself was analogous to a border conflict—limited in scale and localized, with potential for compromise, but was escalated into the opening confrontation of a large-scale war due to political decisions in Washington.

=== Miscellaneous ===
Other names for the conflict include "The Confederate War", "Buchanan's War", "Mr. Lincoln's War", and "Mr. Davis's War". In his 1864 letter to Abraham Lincoln on behalf of the International Working Men's Association, Karl Marx referred to the war as "the American Antislavery War". In 1892, a Washington, D.C. society of war-era nurses took on the name National Association of Army Nurses of the Late War, with "late" meaning simply "recent". More euphemistic terms are "The Late Unpleasantness" and "The Recent Unpleasantness". Other postwar names in the South included "The War of the Sections" and "The Brothers' War", especially in the border states.

== Names of battles and armies ==
Civil War battle names
| Date | Southern name | Northern name |
|---|---|---|
| July 21, 1861 | First Manassas | First Bull Run |
| August 10, 1861 | Oak Hills | Wilson's Creek |
| October 21, 1861 | Leesburg | Ball's Bluff |
| January 19, 1862 | Mill Springs | Logan's Cross Roads |
| March 7–8, 1862 | Elkhorn Tavern | Pea Ridge |
| April 6–7, 1862 | Shiloh | Pittsburg Landing |
| May 31 – June 1, 1862 | Seven Pines | Fair Oaks |
| June 26, 1862 | Mechanicsville | Beaver Dam Creek |
| June 27, 1862 | Gaines's Mill | Chickahominy River |
| August 29–30, 1862 | Second Manassas | Second Bull Run |
| September 1, 1862 | Ox Hill | Chantilly |
| September 14, 1862 | Boonsboro Gap | South Mountain |
| September 14, 1862 | Burkittsville | Crampton's Gap |
| September 17, 1862 | Sharpsburg | Antietam |
| October 8, 1862 | Perryville | Chaplin Hills |
| December 31, 1862 – January 2, 1863 | Murfreesboro | Stones River |
| February 20, 1864 | Olustee | Ocean Pond |
| April 8, 1864 | Mansfield | Sabine Cross Roads |
| September 19, 1864 | Winchester | Opequon |

There is a disparity between the sides in naming some of the battles of the war. The Union forces frequently named battles for bodies of water or other natural features that were prominent on or near the battlefield, but Confederates most often used the name of the nearest town or artificial landmark. The novelist and historian Shelby Foote claimed that many Northerners were urban and regarded bodies of water as noteworthy, but many Southerners were rural and regarded towns as noteworthy. That caused many battles to have two widely used names.

However, not all of the disparities are based on those naming conventions. Many modern accounts of Civil War battles use the names established by the North. However, for some battles, the Southern name has become the standard. The National Park Service occasionally uses the Southern names for its battlefield parks located in the South, such as Manassas and Shiloh. In general, naming conventions were determined by the victor of the battle. Examples of battles with dual names are shown in the table at right.

Civil War armies were also named in a manner reminiscent of the battlefields since Northern armies were frequently named for major rivers (Army of the Potomac, Army of the Tennessee, Army of the Mississippi), and Southern armies for states or geographic regions (Army of Northern Virginia, Army of Tennessee, Army of Mississippi).

Units smaller than armies were named differently in many cases. Corps were usually written out (First Army Corps or simply First Corps), but a postwar convention developed to designate Union corps by using Roman numerals (XI Corps). Often, particularly with Southern armies, corps were more commonly known by the name of the leader (Hardee's Corps, Polk's Corps).

Union brigades were given numeric designations (1st, 2nd, etc.), but Confederate brigades were frequently named after their commanding general (Hood's Brigade, Gordon's Brigade). Confederate brigades so named retained the name of the original commander even when they were commanded temporarily by another man; for example, at the Battle of Gettysburg, Hoke's Brigade was commanded by Isaac Avery and Nicholl's Brigade by Jesse Williams. Nicknames were common in both armies, such as the Iron Brigade and the Stonewall Brigade.

Union artillery batteries were generally named numerically and Confederate batteries by the name of the town or county in which they were recruited (Fluvanna Artillery). Again, they were often simply referred to by their commander's name (Moody's Battery, Parker's Battery).

== See also ==
- Names from the War
- Names of the United States
- Names of the Second World War
