= Order of the Patriotic War =

Military decoration of the Soviet Union

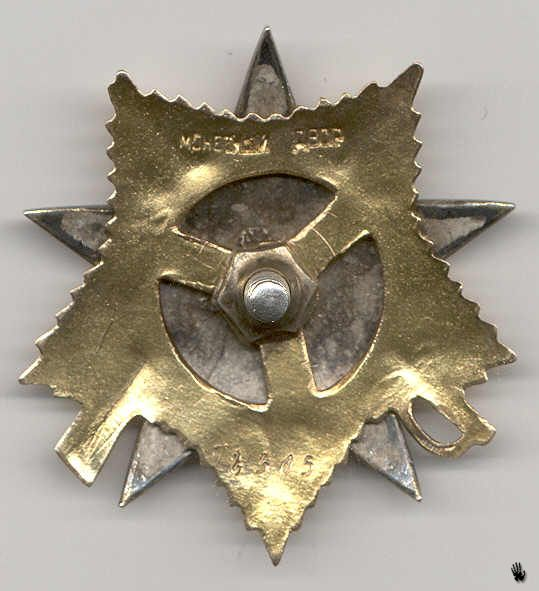
- The Order of the Patriotic War, 1st class (obverse left, reverse right)
- Type: Two-grade order
- Awarded for: Heroic deeds during the Great Patriotic War, later awarded to all surviving veterans of the war.
- Presented by: Soviet Union
- Eligibility: Soldiers in the Soviet armed forces, security troops, partisans, and allied personnel.
- Status: No longer awarded
- Established: 20 May 1942
- Final award: 1985 to surviving veterans of the war

Highlights
- Total: 1,370,000 during the war 9,175,595 following 1985 awards
- US-sized ribbon of the Order of the Patriotic War, 1st class US-sized ribbon of the Order of the Patriotic War, 2nd class

Precedence
- Next (higher): Order of the Red Star
- Next (lower): Order of Alexander Nevsky

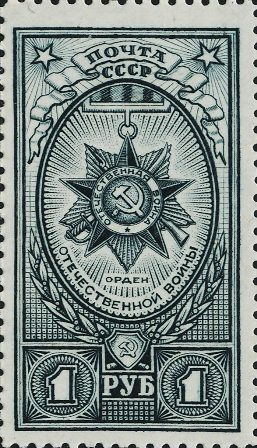
Order of the Patriotic War depicted on a 1943 postage stamp

The Order of the Patriotic War (Russian: Орден Отечественной войны, romanized: Orden Otechestvennoy voiny) is a Soviet military decoration that was awarded to all soldiers in the Soviet Armed Forces, security troops, and to partisans for heroic deeds in the Eastern Front of World War II. After the beginning of the German Operation Barbarossa, the Soviet government applied the term "Great Patriotic War" to the war.

== History ==
The Order was established on 20 May 1942 and came in first class and second class depending upon the merit of the deed. It was the first Soviet order established during the war, and the first Soviet order divided into classes. Its statute precisely defined, which deeds are awarded with the order, e.g. shooting down three aircraft as a fighter pilot, or destroying two heavy or three medium or four light tanks, or capturing a warship, or repairing an aircraft under fire after landing on a hostile territory, and so on, were awarded with the first class. It was also given to some allied troops and commanders, including western allies. All together, over 324,903 of the 1st class and 951,652 of the 2nd class were issued during the war. Until 1985, the total number reached about 1,370,000.

In 1985, during the celebration of the 40th anniversary of Victory Day, it was decided that all surviving veterans of the war would be awarded either 2nd or 1st class of the Order, and about 2,054,000 first class and 5,408,000 second class were issued then.

As of January 1992, the total number of all awarded Orders was 2,487,098 first class and 6,688,497 second class variants.

== Design ==
It featured a red enamel five-pointed star, made of silver, with straight rays in the background, and crossed sabre and a Mosin rifle. The rays in the background were golden for 1st Class and silver for 2nd Class. The central disc had a golden hammer and sickle on a red enamel background, surrounded by a white enamel ring with the words ОТЕЧЕСТВЕННАЯ ВОЙНА ("Patriotic War"). Originally the Order was attached to a plain red ribbon much like the Gold Star award, but from June 1943 the Order was to be worn on the right chest without ribbon; on less formal occasions a ribbon bar, dark red with a bright red central stripe for the 1st Class, or dark red with bright red edge stripes for the 2nd Class, may be worn instead.

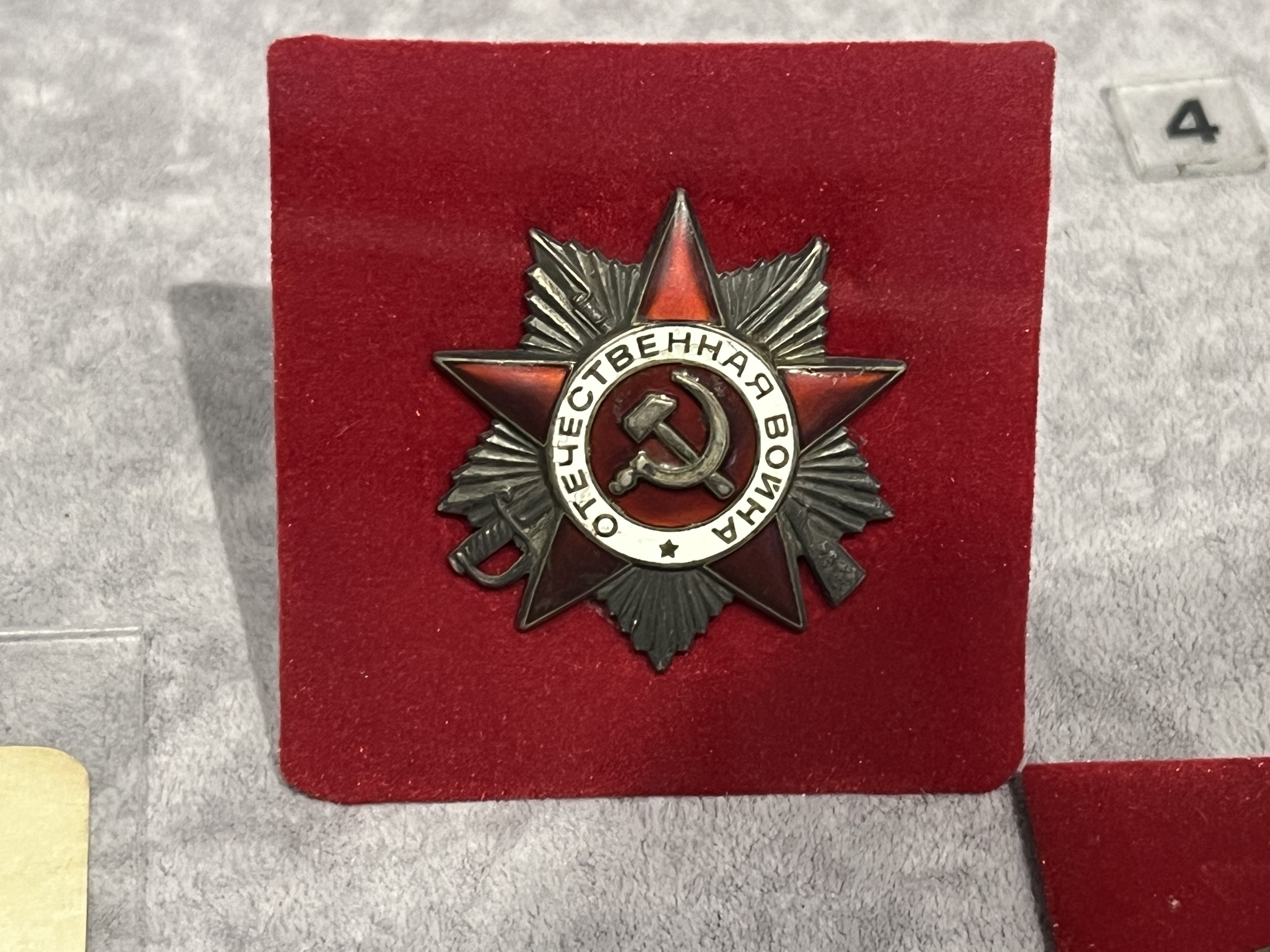
Order of the Patriotic War

Anniversary orders of 1985 were made cheaper, as a single silver piece, gold-plated in the 1st class.

First Class	Second Class
Ribbon
