= Joint Turkmen-Russian Secondary School =

Coordinates: 37.9105°N 58.3681°E

- Совместная туркмено-российская общеобразовательная школа Adyndaky Türkmen-Rus mekdebi
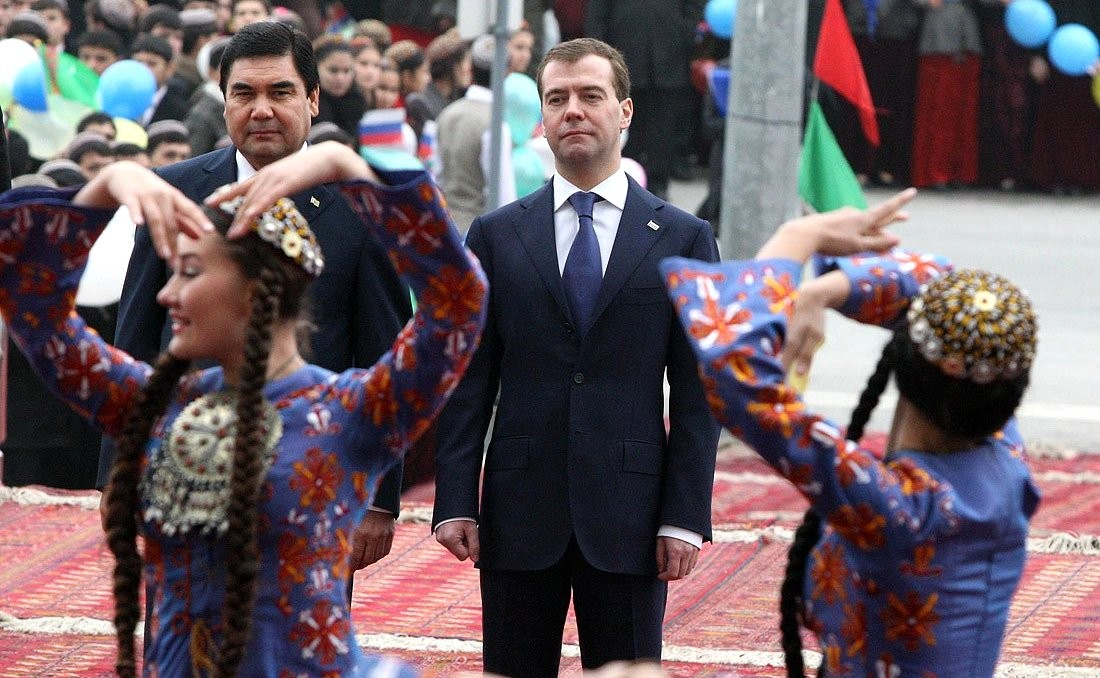
- Russian President Dmitry Medvedev and Turkmen President Gurbanguly Berdymukhamedov at the opening of a new building in the school in December 2009.
- 64 Garashsyzlyk Avenue, Ashgabat; Turkmenistan

Information
- Type: Secondary School
- Established: January 21, 2002
- Principal: Ýelena Konstantinowna Systsowa
- Enrollment: 1000
- Website: www.trsosh.edu.tm

The Alexander Pushkin Joint Turkmen-Russian Secondary School (Russian: Совместная туркмено-российская общеобразовательная школа имени Александра Пушкина; Turkmen: Aleksandr Puşkin adyndaky Türkmen-Rus mekdebi) is a secondary international school in Ashgabat, the capital of Turkmenistan. The school is operated by the Ministry of Education and Science of Russia and the Ministry of Education of Turkmenistan. It was founded in 2002.

== History ==
In 1997, a school was opened in Ashgabat for the children of Russian border officers serving in Turkmenistan. Two years later, in 1999, the school was closed following the expiration of the agreement that established the school. In the years following the school's closure, there was serious debate in the Russian government regarding education of the children of Russian diplomats in Ashgabat. As a result, the school was reestablished on January 21, 2002, following the signing of an agreement between the Turkmen and Russian governments the year before.

On May 29 of that same year, the official academic year of the school began. In December 2009, the President of Turkmenistan Gurbanguly Berdimuhamedov and the President of Russia Dmitry Medvedev took part in the opening of a new 10-story building of the school.
