= Salute 2 America Parade =

The Salute 2 America Parade was an annual U.S. Independence Day parade held in Atlanta, Georgia each Fourth of July. The numeral in the name came from it being originally organized and broadcast by WSB-TV channel 2. For most of its run, the telecast of the parade lasted two hours but in the later years was cut back to 90 minutes. It was preceded by a pre-show of either 30 minutes or an hour. The event was the largest televised Independence Day parade in the country.

In recent years, the hosts were longtime news anchor Monica Kaufman (now Monica Pearson), and sportscaster Chuck Dowdle. The 2006 parade was the first to be broadcast in high definition.

The parade, which had been produced for WSB-TV by Argonne Parades since 1981, began in 1961 and ended its run in 2007. It ran south on Peachtree Street, then briefly northwest on Marietta Street, ending at Centennial Olympic Park. The latter part of the route was used since at least 2005. An estimated 250,000 people came to watch the parade each year, with another estimated 350,000 watching at home.

Archival recordings of the parade from as early as 1958 are held by the Walter J. Brown Media Archives at the University of Georgia as part of the WSB-TV Collection.

Other events on the day include fireworks at Lenox Square (billed as the largest in the Southeast), and at Centennial Olympic Park. The Peachtree Road Race also occurs early in the morning.

In 2008, no parade was held; instead, a Salute 2 America Celebration stage presentation was performed; this parade, along with the fireworks presentation at Lenox Square, continues annually as of 2011.

== Celebrities and performers ==
=== 2006 ===
- Bobby Cox (grand marshal, Atlanta Braves coach)
- Kimberly McCullough, Jason Thompson (grand marshals, General Hospital actors)
- Jennifer Berry (grand marshal, Miss America 2006)
- Little Big Town (singers, U.S. national anthem)
- Diana DeGarmo (singer, local American Idol finalist)
- GEICO Gecko, Atlanta Hawks Harry the Hawk, Atlanta Falcons Freddie Falcon (mascots)
- Falun Dafa drummers, local high school bands
- Oscar the Grouch and Uncle Sam balloons
- Eiffel Tower balloon on Louvre Atlanta float, Centennial Olympic Park 10th-anniversary float
- WSB-TV personalities, including Clark Howard and several others
