= OBD Memorial =

Russian government database project

- Website type: Online database
- Founded: 2007
- Owner: Ministry of Defence (Russia)
- Editor: Ministry of Defence (Russia) / technology provided by «Электронный архив»
- Website: www.obd-memorial.ru
- Commercial: No
- Registration: Optional

OBD Memorial (Russian: Обобщённый банк данных «Мемориал») is a project by the Ministry of Defense of the Russian Federation to scan and make available online data on all Soviet personnel who were killed or were missing in action during the Second World War and afterwards.

The project was launched in November 2006 and the online database was opened for the public access on March 31, 2007. The main sources of information are funds of the Central Archives of the Russian Ministry of Defence (TsAMO) and funds of Military-Memorial Center of the Armed Forces of Russia, including declassified ones. Of those TsAMO documents, ones related to Soviet prisoners of war are documents originated from Germany, and they are scanned as a part of a German-Russian project named Soviet Prisoners of War, that is funded by the government of Germany. Additional sources are the digital version of Book of Memory for Arkhangelsk Oblast; printed Books of Memory for Kaliningrad Oblast and Kaluga Oblast (19 volumes). Physically scanning work is performed by the Center for Scanning and Retroconversion 'Electronic Archive'. The Union of Search Detachments of Russia also participates in the project.

As of December 19, 2007 9,372,000 sheets of documents with 18,900,000 entries were scanned and made available online.
