= New Zealand–Ukraine relations =

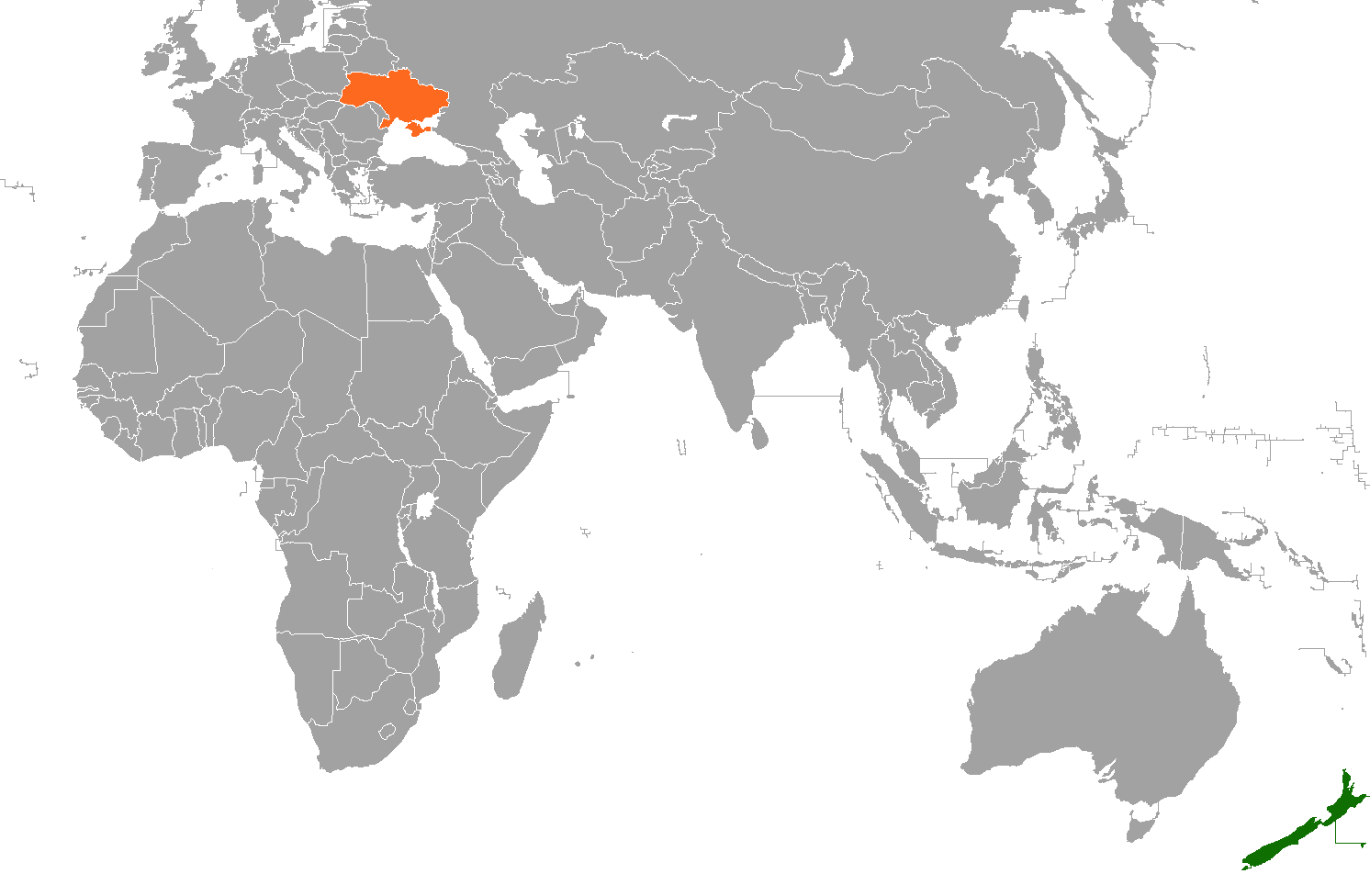

- New Zealand: Ukraine

New Zealand–Ukraine relations are the foreign relations between New Zealand and Ukraine. Following the collapse of the Soviet Union, New Zealand formally established diplomatic relations with Ukraine in March 1992. The two countries subsequently expanded diplomatic contacts and economic relations over the next three decades. Following the 2022 Russian invasion of Ukraine, New Zealand supported Ukraine by condemning Russia's actions and providing diplomatic and military assistance.

== Diplomatic representation ==
New Zealand conducts relations with Ukraine through its embassy in Warsaw, Poland. Ukraine's embassy in Canberra, Australia is accredited to New Zealand. Both countries are members of the United Nations.

== History ==
=== Soviet era ===
In 1960, the New Zealand Prime Minister Walter Nash visited Kyiv as part of New Zealand's first official visit to the Soviet Union. While visiting Kyiv, Nash was hosted by Nikifor Kalchenko, the chairman of the Council of Ministers of the Ukrainian Soviet Socialist Republic. Besides laying a wreath on the Tomb of the Unknown Children in the Park of Eternal Glory, Nash also visited collective farms in the Kyiv region.

In 1974, the New Zealand Ambassador to the Soviet Union Brian Lendrum visited several Ukrainian cities including Simferopil, Yalta, Odesa, and Kyiv.

=== Pre-invasion independent Ukraine, 1992–2022 ===
After Ukraine declared its independence in 1991, New Zealand cross-accredited its ambassador to five of the new former Soviet republics: Russia, Ukraine, Belarus, Uzbekistan, and Kazakhstan. This marked the first time that New Zealand recognised Ukraine as a sovereign country.

In October 1998, Environment Minister and Associate Foreign Minister Simon Upton visited Ukraine.

During the Orange Revolution, the New Zealand Minister of Foreign Affairs and Trade Phil Goff declined to issue a statement but stated that the New Zealand Government was "extremely concerned about the situation in Ukraine." Despite the Government's muted response, the New Zealand media covered the events of the Orange Revolution, which help generate public interest in Ukraine. Ukrainian New Zealanders also organised demonstrations in Auckland and Christchurch supporting the Orange Revolution.

In 2004, New Zealand supported Ukraine's request to become a Consultative Party to the Antarctic Treaty System during the 27th consultative meeting of the Treaty signatories in Cape Town.

In April 2006, Foreign Minister Winston Peters visited Ukraine and met with President Viktor Yuschenko. During that visit, the two governments agreed to accelerate bilateral political dialogue and economic cooperation and forge closer business and investment ties. In addition, the two Governments signed a cooperation agreement to carry out joint fishery, agriculture, environmental protection, and Antarctic research projects.

=== Russian invasion of Ukraine, 2022–present ===
==== Sixth Labour Government, 2022–2023 ====
When Russia invaded Ukraine in late February 2022, New Zealand joined other Western governments in condemning the invasion and supporting Ukrainian sovereignty. In early March 2022, New Zealand joined 140 states in voting for United Nations General Assembly Resolution ES-11/1, which condemned the invasion and demanded that Russia withdraw. That same day, New Zealand joined 39 other states that were parties to the Rome Statute in referring the Ukrainian situation to the Prosecutor of the International Criminal Court.

On 9 March, the New Zealand Parliament unanimously passed legislation imposing autonomous sanctions on Russia in response to the invasion. On 21 March, New Zealand donated NZ$5 million in aid to the NATO (North Atlantic Treaty Organization) Trust Fund for Ukraine. On 28 March, New Zealand dispatched nine New Zealand Defence Force (NZDF) personnel to the United Kingdom and Belgium to assist with intelligence and military engagement work. In addition, the New Zealand Cabinet approved the use of the NZDF's open source intelligence capabilities to support NATO.

On 11 April, New Zealand dispatched an NZDF C-130 Hercules transport plane and up to 50 troops to Europe for two months in support of Ukraine. The NZDF also dispatched eight logistics specialists to support the International Donor Coordination Centre in Germany's efforts to distribute aid and supplies to Ukraine. New Zealand contributed NZ$7.5 million to support Ukraine's weapons procurement from Ukraine and NZ$4.1 million for the Ukrainian Main Directorate of Intelligence to obtain access to commercial satellite imagery.

On 23 May, New Zealand dispatched a NZDF artillery training team consisting of about 30 personnel to the United Kingdom to help train Ukrainian military personnel to operate L119 light field guns.

On 27 June, Prime Minister Jacinda Ardern announced that New Zealand would contribute NZ$4.5 million worth of aid to the NATO Trust Fund including medical kits, fuel, communications equipment, and rations for the Ukrainian Army, bringing the total amount of New Zealand military assistance to Ukraine to $33 million. In addition, the Government dispatched a military officer to support the International Criminal Court's investigation into alleged Russian war crimes. New Zealand also contributed $1 million to the ICC Trust Fund for Victims and the ICC Office of the Prosecutor. In addition, the Government extended the deployment and number of New Zealand military and intelligence personnel assisting NATO forces in Western Europe.

On 30 June, New Zealand supported Ukraine's challenge against Russian allegations of Ukrainian genocide in the Luhansk and Donetsk regions at the International Criminal Court (ICJ). This marked New Zealand's second international legal intervention in support of another country at the ICJ. That same day, Ardern spoke by telephone with Ukrainian president Volodymyr Zelenskyy. She reassured Zelenskyy that New Zealand would continue imposing sanctions on Russia. In return, Zelenskyy thanked New Zealand for providing aid to Ukraine and called for assistance in rebuilding the country. Though Zelenskyy had earlier invited Ardern to visit Ukraine during her European trade mission, Ardern had been unable to due to scheduling conflicts.

In mid-August, New Zealand dispatched 120 NZDF personnel to help train Ukrainian military forces in the United Kingdom as part of an international effort to assist Ukraine's defence against the Russian invasion. This brought the total number of NZDF personnel deployed to support the war in Ukraine to 224.

In November 2022, Defence Minister Peeni Henare visited Kyiv where he met Ukrainian Defence Minister Oleksii Reznikov and paid tribute to the fallen at The Wall of Remembrance of the Fallen for Ukraine. Henare's visit was the first by a New Zealand government minister since Russia invaded Ukraine.

On 14 December, Zelenskyy addressed the New Zealand Parliament via video conference, becoming the second head of government, after Australian Prime Minister Julia Gillard, to address New Zealand Members of Parliament. Zelenskyy thanked New Zealand for supporting Ukraine against Russia's invasion and imposing sanctions on Russia. He also urged New Zealand to support his ten-point plan that he outlined at the 2022 G20 Bali summit in Indonesia and assist with landmine removal. In response, Ardern announced that New Zealand would contribute NZ$3 million in humanitarian aid including medical supplies and equipment, power transformers and generators, food, water, sanitation, and hygiene items. Other political leaders including National Party leader Christopher Luxon, Green Party co-leader James Shaw, ACT Party leader David Seymour, and Māori Party co-leaders Debbie Ngarewa-Packer and Rawiri Waititi also made statements voicing support for Ukraine and condemning Russian actions.

Several New Zealanders have traveled to Ukraine to support Ukrainian military forces and other international volunteers in their fight against Russia. In response, the NZDF issued a directive instructing personnel to notify their chain command about their international travel plans. The Ministry of Foreign Affairs and Trade (MFAT) has discouraged New Zealanders from traveling to Ukraine. Notable New Zealanders who perished during the Russian invasion of Ukraine have included off-duty New Zealand Army soldiers Dominic Abelen and Kane Te Tai, and aid worker Andrew Bagshaw.

==== Sixth National Government, 2023–present ====
On 22 February 2024, Defence Minister Judith Collins and Foreign Minister Winston Peters extended the NZDF's deployment in Europe to train Ukrainian soldiers to June 2025. Collins also confirmed that the NZ military deployment's training mandate will be expanded from July 2024 to include specialised training in combat casualty care, combat engineering, leadership, and maritime explosive ordnance disposal training. Peters also announced that New Zealand would contribute a NZ$25.9 million aid package to Ukraine including NZ$6.5 million to procure weapons and ammunition for Ukraine, NZ$7 million in humanitarian assistance, and $3 million to supporting the World Bank's Ukrainian relief and reconstruction fund. This aid package brings NZ's total aid contribution to Ukraine since the war began to over NZ$100 million. Ukrainian president Zelenskyy expressed gratitude to Prime Minister Christopher Luxon for the new aid package.

In mid-June 2024, the New Zealand Government dispatched senior cabinet minister Mark Mitchell to represent New Zealand at the Summit on Peace in Ukraine at Bürgenstock Resort in Switzerland held on 15–16 June 2024. Foreign Minister Peters also reiterated New Zealand's solidarity with Ukraine and support for the Ukrainian "10-point peace formula." In mid-July 2024, Luxon announced that New Zealand would contribute a further NZ$16 million worth of aid to Ukraine, bringing New Zealand's total aid contribution to Ukraine since 2022 to NZ$130 million. On 11 July, Luxon met with President Zelenskyy during the Indo-Pacific 4 meeting, where he said that the IP-4 countries "shared in Ukraine's outrage at Russia's callous disregard for life".

Following the 2025 Trump–Zelenskyy meeting held in late February 2025, Luxon reiterated New Zealand's support for Ukraine, stating that New Zealand remained "steadfast in its support for Ukraine as it defends itself in a war that Russia started." On 15 March 2025, Luxon attended a virtual summit for international leaders discussing the deployment of peacekeepers to Ukraine in the event of a peace settlement with Russia. In mid-April 2025, Luxon confirmed that New Zealand would be extending its deployment of 100 military personnel in the United Kingdom to training Ukrainian military forces until December 2026. In addition, New Zealand would continue its intelligence, liaison and logistics support for the Ukrainian military.

In late June 2025, Luxon announced that the New Zealand Government would contribute NZ$16 million in aid to Ukraine ahead of the annual NATO summit. This includes $4 million worth of lethal military assistance, $4 million worth of non-lethal military assistance, $7 million in humanitarian assistance for conflict-affected communities and $1 million to aid Ukrainian refugees displaced in neighbouring countries.

In early September 2025, Defence Minister Collins visited Kyiv where she met with several senior Ukrainian officials including Defense Minister Denys Shmyhal, Foreign Minister Andrii Sybiha, Ukrainian Deputy Defense Minister Oleksandr Kozenko and the head of Kyiv's city military administration Tymur Tkachenko. Collins also visited a former apartment building that had been destroyed by Russian missiles in June 2025 and the Wall of Remembrance. Collins and New Zealand Defence Force chief and Air Marshal Tony Davies emphasised New Zealand's support for Ukraine and the international rules-based order.

In early December 2025, Collins and Peters announced that New Zealand would contribute NZ$15 million towards the "Prioritised Ukraine Requirements List" (PURL), an American and NATO initiative to supply Ukraine with American-manufactured weapons and equipment. This defence aid contribution was welcomed by Ukrainian Ambassador Vasyl Myroshnychenko.

== Economic relations and tourism ==
Since Ukraine was part of the Soviet Union until 1992, there was limited information on the volume of trade with New Zealand. According to Christchurch businessman John Henderson, Ukrainian enterprises were a major market for New Zealand wool exports in 1980.

Due to Ukraine's economic stagnation during the 1990s, bilateral trade between New Zealand and Ukraine was chaotic with both countries having to develop their economic relations from "scratch." By 2004, Ukraine only ranked 136th on New Zealand's list of trading partners.

After Ukraine's economy stabilise in 2004, the two countries concluded a bilateral agreement on goods access according to the rules of the World Trade Organization. In 2006, Foreign Minister Peters visited Ukraine to promote bilateral cooperation in the areas of satellites and aircraft building, informational technologies, fishing, and agriculture. New Zealand dairy producer Fonterra also viewed Ukraine as a market for its dairy exports.

In terms of public diplomacy, New Zealand's "Operation Cover Up" programme supported orphanages in Ukraine during the early 2000s. During the 2000s, high schools in Christchurch and Kharkiv explored establishing contacts.

In late 2004, 16 New Zealand residents visited Ukraine through the auspices of the Auckland-based tourism company "Beyond Tours Ltd." By 2005, this figure, had grown to 38 individuals. Between July 2004 and June 2005, 335 New Zealand residents visited Ukraine.

By 2017, the total trade volume between New Zealand and Ukraine was NZ$22 million. New Zealand exported NZ$12.4 million worth of goods to Ukraine including frozen wish, grape wine, cereals, and meat. In return, Ukraine exported NZ$9.4 million worth of processed products including boats, floating structures, fats, oils, dyes, tannin, and paint.

== Migration ==
During the 19th and early 20th centuries, Ukrainian immigration to New Zealand was limited due to the latter's "highly selective and exclusivist" immigration policy in the past which favoured immigrant of British stock. One Poltava-born man named Anton Omelchenko, who visited Christchurch in 1910, was responsible for supplying horses to Captain Robert Falcon Scott's Terra Nova Expedition to Antarctica. In 1949, about 170 Ukrainian refugees settled in New Zealand as part of a brief wave of 930 former Soviet citizens who settled in New Zealand between 1949 and 1951. Many of these Ukrainians settled in Pahiatua in the North Island where the established a "neighbourhood community" that consisted of a choir, children's musical group, and a church. The number of Soviet-born residents in New Zealand rose slightly from 506 in 1951 to 982 in 1976. Between 2001 and 2013, the number of Ukrainian-born residents in New Zealand rose from 840 to 1,350.

Following the Russian invasion of Ukraine, the New Zealand Government introduced a two-year work visa programme in March 2022 allowing New Zealand citizens and residents of Ukrainian descent to sponsor Ukrainian family members seeking to shelter in New Zealand. This "Special Ukraine Policy" aims to bring over 4,000 Ukrainians to New Zealand and comes with work and study rights. By early November 2022, 1,000 visas had been grant and 400 Ukrainians had arrived in New Zealand. However, support group "Mahi for New Zealand" urged the Government to expand the level of financial, English language, and health assistance for Ukrainian refugees. Due to the lack of support, some refugees had returned to Ukraine. In late February 2023, the New Zealand Government extended the 2022 Special Ukraine Visa application window to 15 March 2024 and the travel window from nine to 12 months. In addition, the Government allowed "acceptable sponsors" who were not relatives of Ukrainian refugees to assume their financial and other obligations.

== Resident diplomatic missions ==
- New Zealand is accredited to Ukraine from its embassy in Warsaw, Poland.
- Ukraine is accredited to New Zealand from its embassy in Canberra, Australia.

== See also ==
- Foreign relations of New Zealand
- Foreign relations of Ukraine
- Ukrainian New Zealanders
