= Ukrainian New Zealanders =

- (New Zealand) (Ukraine)

Total population
- Ukrainian; 1,350 (2013)

Regions with significant populations
- Christchurch, Auckland, Wellington

Languages
- Ukrainian, New Zealand English

Religion
- Byzantine Catholic, Eastern Orthodox

Related ethnic groups
- Ukrainian Australians

Ukrainian New Zealanders (Ukrainian: Українці Нової Зеландії) are an ethnic minority amongst New Zealanders, consisting mainly of Ukrainian immigrants and New Zealand-born citizens of Ukrainian descent. Currently, the main concentrations of Ukrainians are located in Christchurch and Auckland.

== History ==
According to the political scientists Professor Natalia Chaban and Vlag Vernygora, connections between New Zealand and Ukraine prior to 1991 were "largely anecdotal and, when and if, original, mostly incomplete." Very, very few Ukrainians migrated to New Zealand during the 19th and 20th centuries due to various factors including New Zealand's "highly selective and exclusivist" immigration policy in the past which favoured immigrant of British stock. One Poltava-born man named Anton Omelchenko, who visited Christchurch in 1910, was responsible for supplying horses to Captain Robert Falcon Scott's Terra Nova Expedition to Antarctica. Since much of Ukraine was historically part of the Russian Empire and Soviet Union, much of the New Zealand public identified Ukraine as being part of Russia and the Soviet Union.

The formation of the Ukrainian community in New Zealand dates back to 1949 when about 170 Ukrainian refugees arrived in New Zealand following World War II. According to Chaban and Vernygora, these Ukrainian migrants were part of a wave of 930 former Soviet citizens who settled in New Zealand between 1949 and 1951. Many of these Ukrainians settled in Pahiatua in the North Island and established a "neighbourhood community" in an attempt to preserve their Ukrainian ethnic identity. Between the 1950s and 1970s, these Ukrainians had a choir, children's musical group, and a church with a Sunday school. The number of Soviet-born residents in New Zealand rose slightly from 506 in 1951 to 982 in 1976.

By 2001, there were 840 Ukrainian-born residents residing in New Zealand. According to the 2006 New Zealand census, 1,152 residents of the country declared Ukraine to be the place of their birth, and a further 672 inhabitants to consider themselves to be Ukrainian by ethnicity. By 2013, there were 1,350 Ukrainian-born people living in New Zealand.

The 2004 Orange Revolution raised public awareness of Ukraine in New Zealand. While the New Zealand Government did not take an active position on the Orange Revolution, New Zealanders of Ukrainian descent and sympathetic New Zealanders expressed support for the pro-democratic movement led by Viktor Yushchenko and Yulia Tymoshenko. Ukrainian New Zealanders Nataliya Poshyvaylo-Tower and Alex Melnychuk organised two solidarity demonstrations in Auckland and Christchurch, which attracted 46 people.

== Community groups ==
Notable local Ukrainian community groups have included the Auckland-based Ukrainian Association of New Zealand and the Ukrainian Gromada of Wellington.

=== Ukrainian Association of New Zealand ===
On 15 June 2007, the Ukrainian Association of New Zealand (North) was officially registered. Mr Stefan Romaniw OAM, chairman, AFUO, Secretary General, World Congress of Ukrainians, congratulated UANZ with this event. Thus, the Ukrainians of New Zealand were considered to be the part of the global Ukrainian community. The current Chairman of the UANZ is Ms Nataliya Poshyvaylo-Towler.

In addition to the successful formation of similar initiatives with organisations in other parts of New Zealand (Central North Island and South Island), UANZ initial steps were aimed at commemorating the 75th Anniversary of Holodomor 1932–1933 in Ukraine, which remained virtually unknown to New Zealanders. Therefore, the main task for UANZ was not simply to provide New Zealanders with relevant information about Holodomor, but to show and prove that the strong Ukrainian people, despite the historical challenges and great number of victims, managed to survive and now continues to adequately build their own state.

The congratulatory message of Dr. Lockwood Smith, Speaker of the New Zealand House of Representatives, Parliament of New Zealand, to the Ukrainian community of New Zealand on the occasion of the 50th Anniversary of the Ukrainian immigrants' arrival in this country had the important political and humanitarian perspective for Ukraine's relations with New Zealand. In his message Dr. L. Smith, among other, noted the current level of development of the Ukrainian community of New Zealand, and also stressed the importance of understanding historical events in the Ukrainians' development, including the tragedy of famine in Ukraine. The specified message of New Zealand senior officials confirmed the important attention of the New Zealand Side to the UANZ and to the development of relations with Ukraine.

== See also ==
- European New Zealanders
- Europeans in Oceania
- Immigration to New Zealand
- Pākehā
- New Zealand–Ukraine relations
- Ukrainian Australians
