= National Museum of the Holodomor-Genocide =

Museum in Kyiv, Ukraine

Coordinates: 50.4382°N 30.5540°E

- Національний музей Голодомору-геноциду
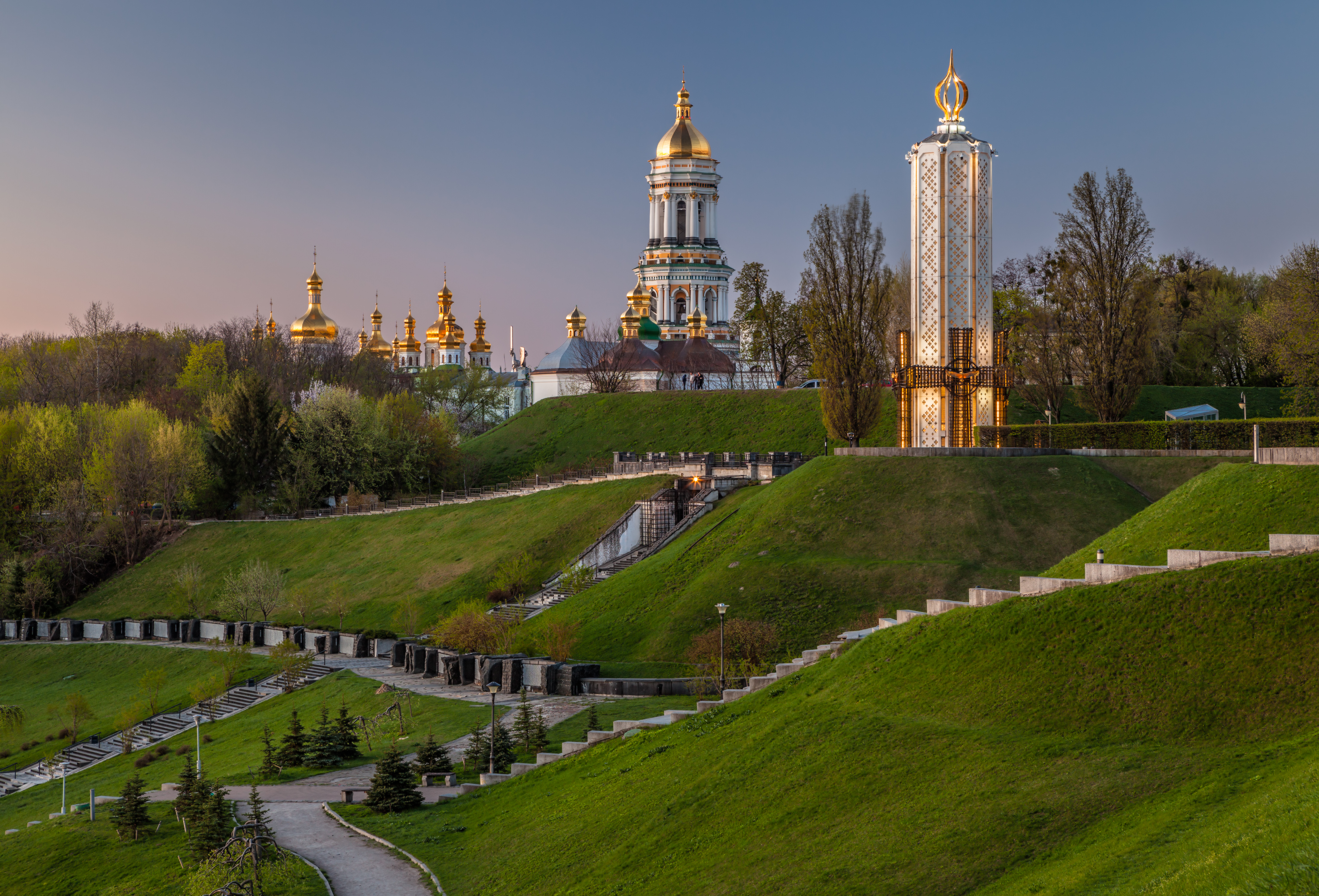
- General view of the museum complex
- Established: 2008
- Location: 3 Lavrska St., Kyiv, Ukraine
- Type: Hall of Memory
- Visitors: 190,000 (2018)
- Public transit access: Arsenalna (Kyiv Metro)
- Website: https://www.holodomormuseum.org.ua/eng

The National Museum of the Holodomor-Genocide (Ukrainian: Національний музей Голодомору-геноциду, romanized: Natsionalnyi muzei Holodomoru-henotsydu), formerly known as the Memorial in Commemoration of the Holodomor-Genocide in Ukraine, is Ukraine's national museum and a centre devoted to the victims of the Holodomor of 1932–1933, a man-made famine that killed millions in Ukraine. The museum was opened on the day of the 75th anniversary of the Holodomor in 2008. It gained the status of a national museum in 2010. The museum is located on the Pechersk Hills on the right bank of the Dnieper River in Kyiv, adjacent to the Kyiv Pechersk Lavra.

== History ==
On 28 November 2006, the Parliament of Ukraine (Verkhovna Rada) voted to recognize the Holodomor, a devastating famine which took place in the early 1930s in the former Ukrainian Soviet Socialist Republic, as a deliberate act of genocide against the Ukrainian people. The bill was signed into law by President Viktor Yushchenko and included a provision for commemorative and research activities, and the construction of memorials to honour the victims and preserve the memory of the Holodomor tragedy for future generations.

The Memorial in Commemoration of Famines' Victims in Ukraine was erected on the slopes of the Dnipro river in 2008, welcoming its first visitors on 22 November 2008. The ceremony of the memorial's opening was dedicated to the 75th anniversary of the Holodomor.

On 8 July 2009, the Cabinet of Ministers of Ukraine signed a decree that established a state museum "The Memorial in Commemoration of Famines' Victims in Ukraine". The museum subsequently acquired the status of a national museum on 18 February 2010.

Starting from February 2010, the museum has been included in the official program for visits to Ukraine by Heads of States and foreign delegations and officials.

On 31 July 2015, the Ministry of Culture of Ukraine renamed the museum in order to reflect the singular instance of the famine-genocide known as Holodomor. Prior to this, the museum, which represents three famines — the 1921–1923 famine, the 1932–1933 famine, and the 1946-1947 famine — used the term 'Holodomor' as a plural term. The plural has been removed in order to offset the understanding of the Holodomor being the 1932–1933 famine as being exclusively deemed to be genocidal in nature.

On July 12, 2023, according to the official web portal of the Ukrainian Parliament, the Verkhovna Rada of Ukraine plans to allocate additional funds to complete the construction and commissioning of the National Museum of the Holodomor Genocide. It is planned to allocate UAH 573.9 million from the state budget. The allocation of funds will make it possible to complete the entire complex of construction work at the museum in a short time.

== Architecture and symbolism ==
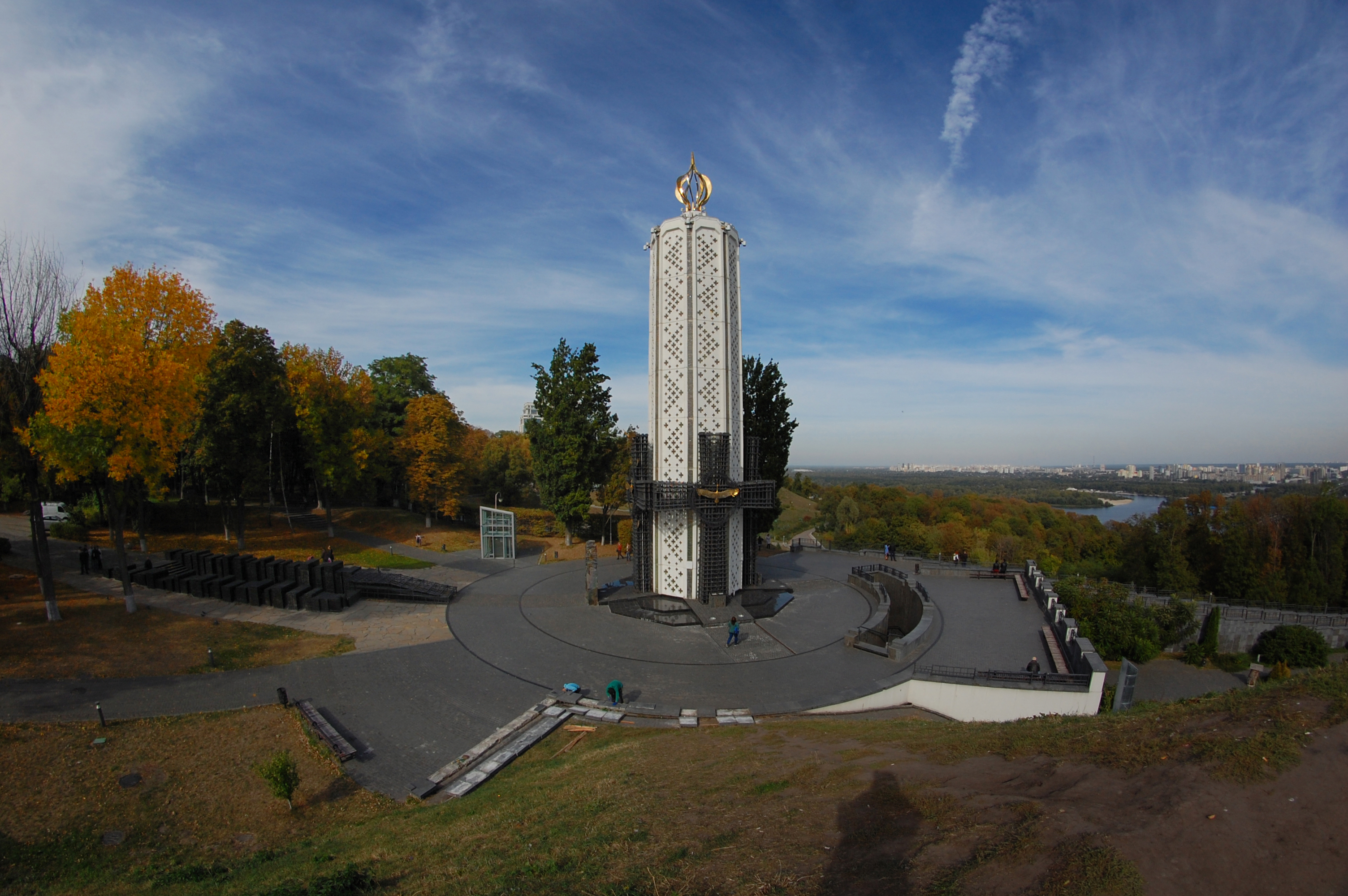
Central part of the memorial, symbolizing a burning candle

The museum consists of the memorial complex and the underground Hall of Memory that houses permanent exhibitions and artifacts from the famines’ periods. The memorial complex was conceptualized and designed by the Ukrainian folk artist Anatoliy Haydamaka and architect Yuriy Kovalyov. The symbolism of the famines’ events and human sufferings is amply portrayed on the museums’ grounds and in its architecture.

The entrance of the alley to the memorial complex is framed by two statues of angels, referred to as the Angels of Sorrow. The angels represent the guardians of the souls of the starved. In the centre of the alley, 24 millstones (the Millstones of Destiny) are set in a circle and carry a dual meaning. On the one hand, they symbolize the source of food and life. On the other hand, they represent a 24-hour clock, reminding that up to 24,000 human lives were ground to death daily during the Holodomor.

A haunting statue of a young girl clutching a handful of wheat stands is in the middle of the alley. This statue, Bitter Memory of Childhood, is dedicated to the most vulnerable victims of starvation — children. Picking up wheat left on the collective farm fields after reaping was considered a crime and was punishable by up to 10 years of imprisonment or even death. The paving leading to the centre of the memorial and the Hall of Memory symbolizes the highly fertile black soils of Ukraine.

The central part of the memorial is a white, 30-meter high candle-shaped monument, known as the Candle of Memory. The monument is decorated with glass crosses of different sizes arranged in a Ukrainian folk embroidery pattern. The crosses symbolize the souls of the famines’ victims, young and old. The bronze figures of storks soaring from the base of the monument represent the rebirth of the Ukrainian nation.

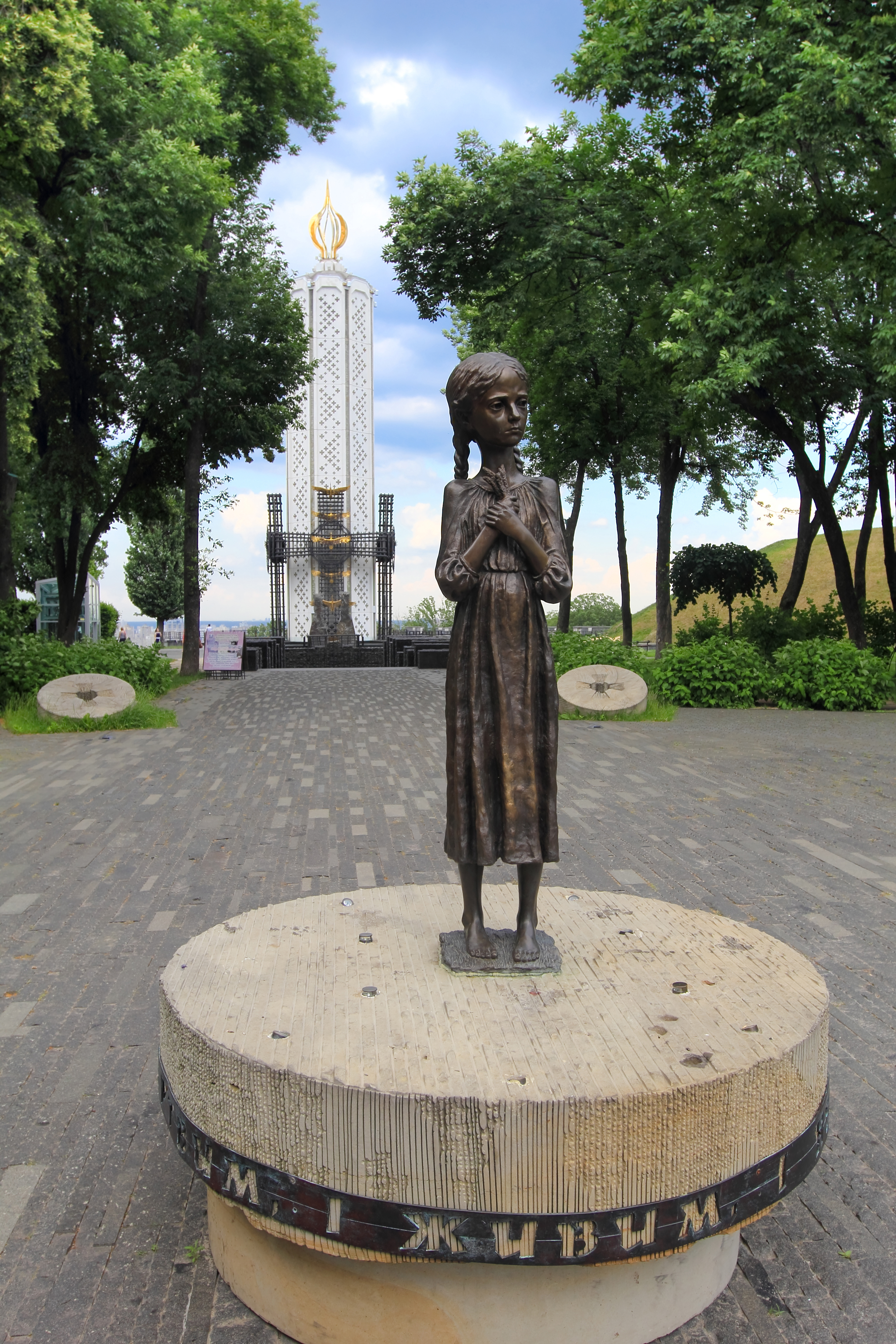
Sculpture near the entrance to the memorial

Below ground is a well-conceived Hall of Memory. In the Hall, visitors have an opportunity to commemorate the famines' victims by lighting a candle and by ringing a bell. A 20-minute educational film about the Ukrainian famines is projected on the walls of the Hall. A collection of artefacts dating back to the famines is displayed. These include period farm equipment, agricultural tools and household items. Visitors also have an opportunity to browse the volumes of the National Memory Book of Famine's Victims of 1932–1933 and provide information about their relatives who died of starvation in Ukraine.

The Hall of Memory leads visitors to the Black Board Alley. The symbolic black boards document the names of Ukrainian towns and villages which had suffered during the dark years of the famines. The names of 14 thousand villages and towns of Ukraine are engraved on the boards, which have become one of the most striking symbols of the Holodomor.

== 3D Model Bitter memory of childhood ==
In 2017, the company AERO3Dengineering developed a 3D model of the “Bitter memory of childhood” for the National Museum.

== Location and access ==
The museum is situated on the Pechersk Hills, one of Kyiv's most picturesque and ancient places on the high bank of the Dnipro, near the Kyiv Pechersk Lavra. The museum is easily accessible by public transport, the closest metro station is Arsenalna Station.

The museum is open every day from 10:00 until 18:00. Technical day is the second Tuesday of the month. General admission fee to the underground section of the museum (the Hall of Memory) is ₴30 for adults, ₴20 for Students, ₴15 for children. Guided tours are offered hourly from 10:00 to 17:30 and are available in Ukrainian, English, Russian. In 2012, the museum received more than 470,000 visitors, offered 2,160 guided tours, and hosted eight official delegations.

== Educational and research activities ==
The museum's goal is to collect, study, preserve and disseminate materials and knowledge that illuminate the Holodomor as an act of genocide against the Ukrainian people, to remember the scale of the tragedy of the Ukrainian famines, and to learn from these events so that they never occur again.

The museum currently offers educational programs and exhibitions. It plans to expand its educational efforts to include outreach programs for schools, post-secondary establishments and public libraries, as well as to offer teachers training sessions and seminars on the history of the Holodomor.

The museum is working on creating a database of the Ukrainian famines' survivors and victims, which will be made accessible to the Ukrainians and the international community.

== Memorial on-line ==
In 2012, the museum, in partnership with the International Renaissance Foundation and the Memorial in Commemoration of Famines' Victims in Ukraine charity, launched an Internet project to provide open and free access to collections of digitized materials on the Ukrainian famines. The project provides centralized access to archival collections of documents, periodicals, photographs, videos, and survivor and witness testimonies on all three famines in Ukraine the information is contained in the most complete Martyrology containing the names of about 900,000 dead in 1932–33.

== International collaboration ==
The museum aims to expand its activities to become a global centre for research on famine, victimization and human rights.

In July 2012, the museum signed a Memorandum of Understanding with the Canadian Museum for Human Rights to share knowledge, best practices and research resources related to the Holodomor. Both organizations committed to working together to educate the international community on human rights issues, with a particular focus on the relevance of the human rights lessons of the Holodomor.

The Holodomor monument "Bitter Memories of Childhood" was unveiled in 2014.

== Gallery ==
National Museum "Memorial to Holodomor victims"
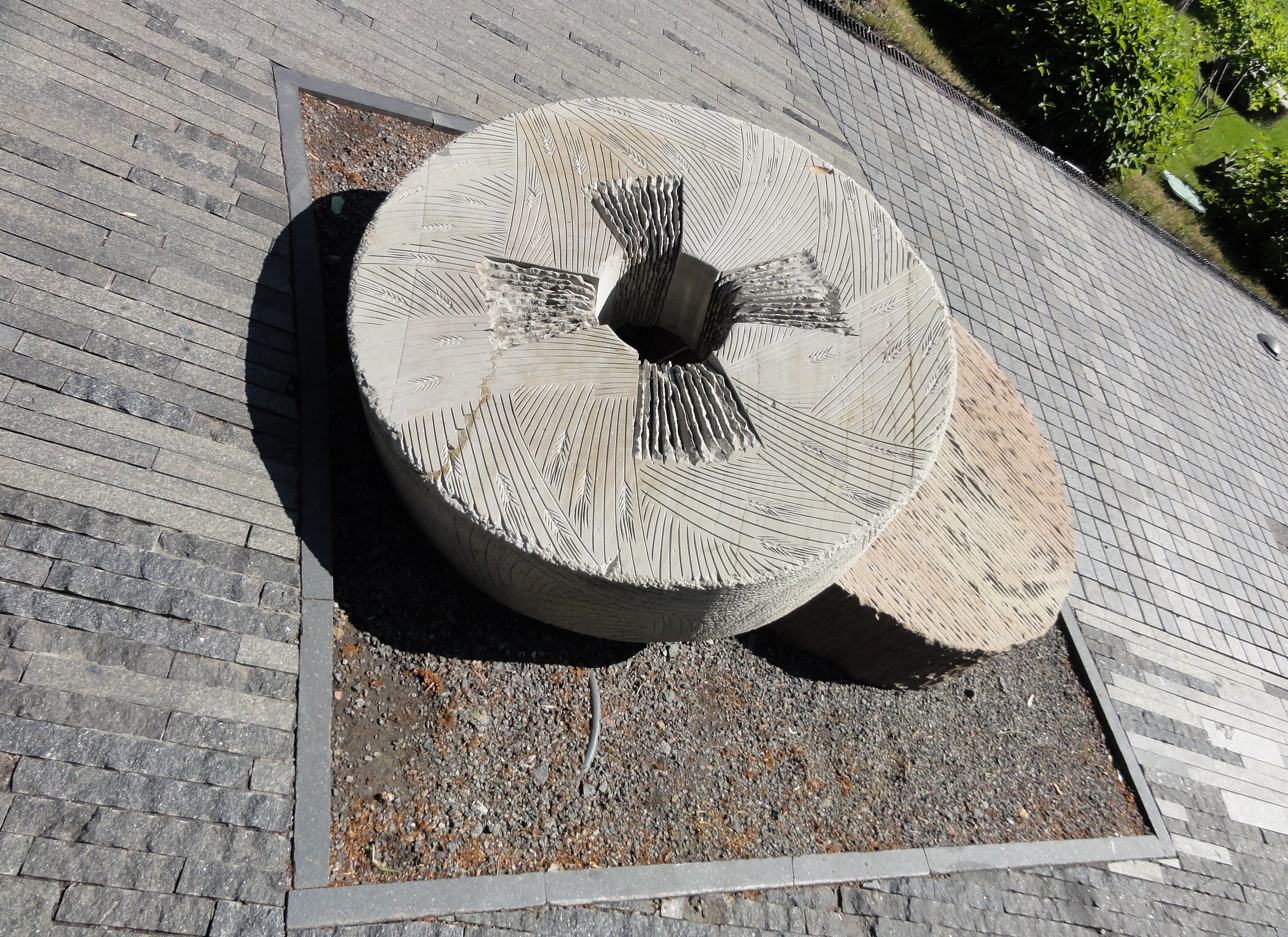
Symbolic grindstones serving as part of the memorial

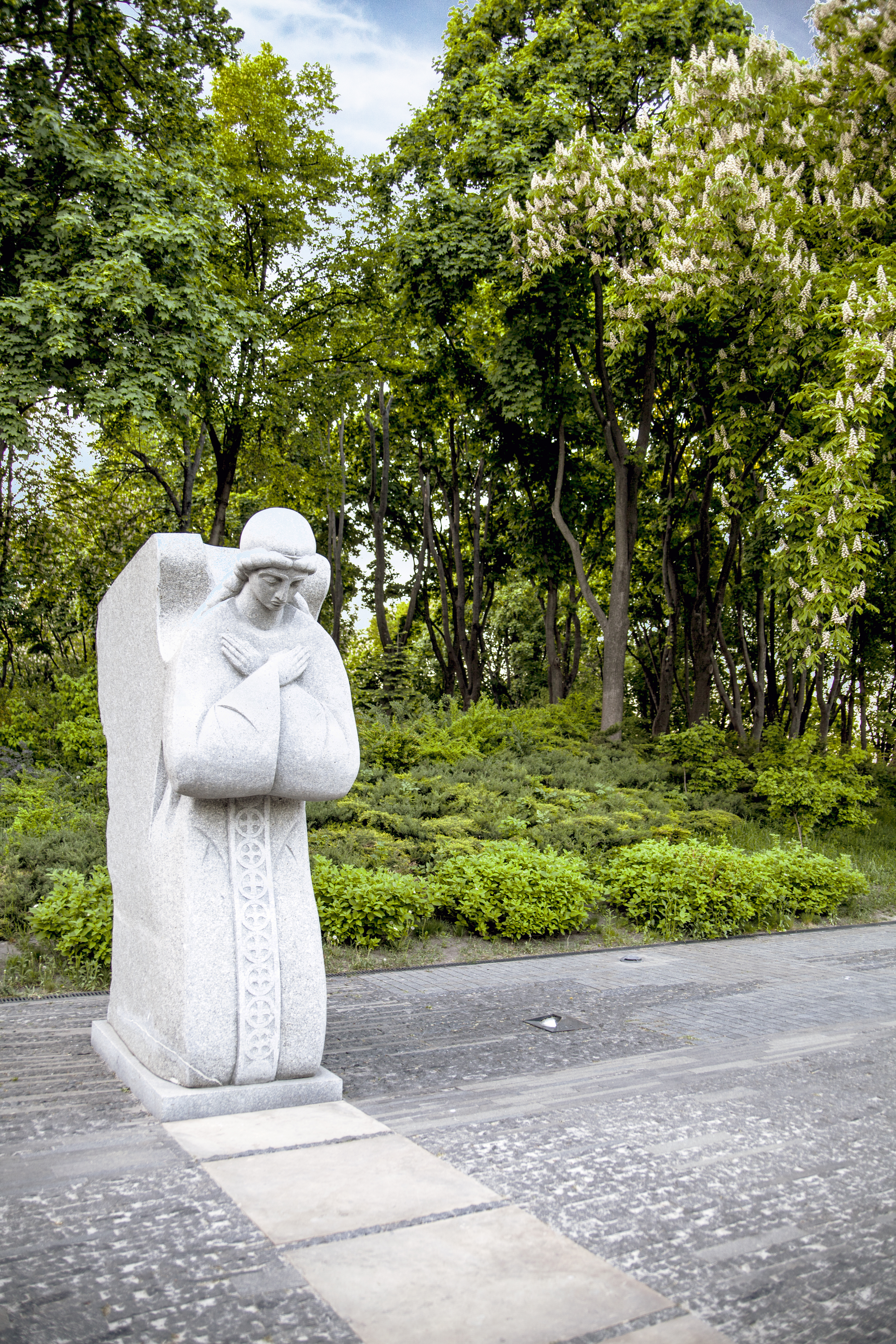
The Angel of Sorrow

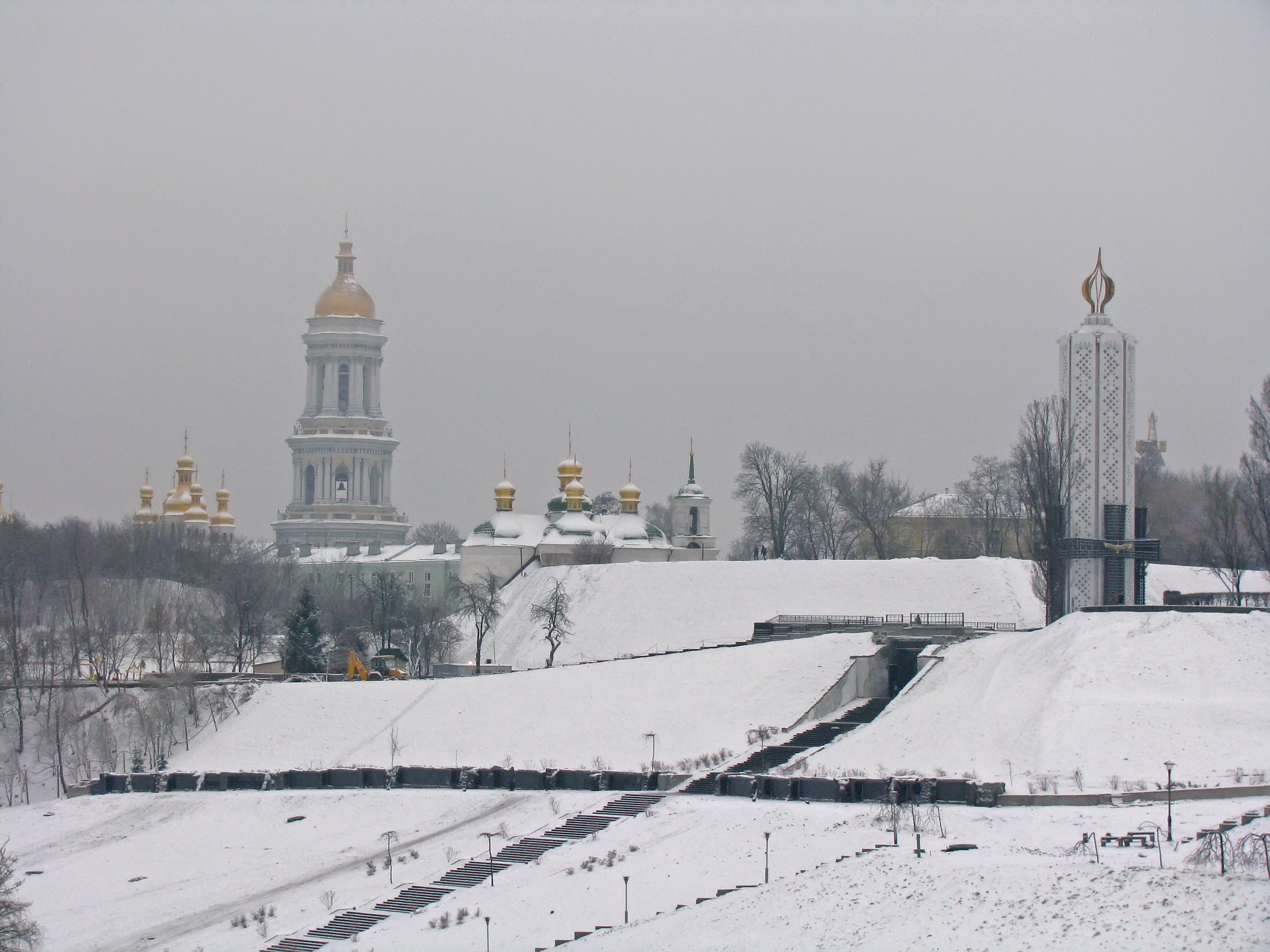
Panorama of the museum in winter

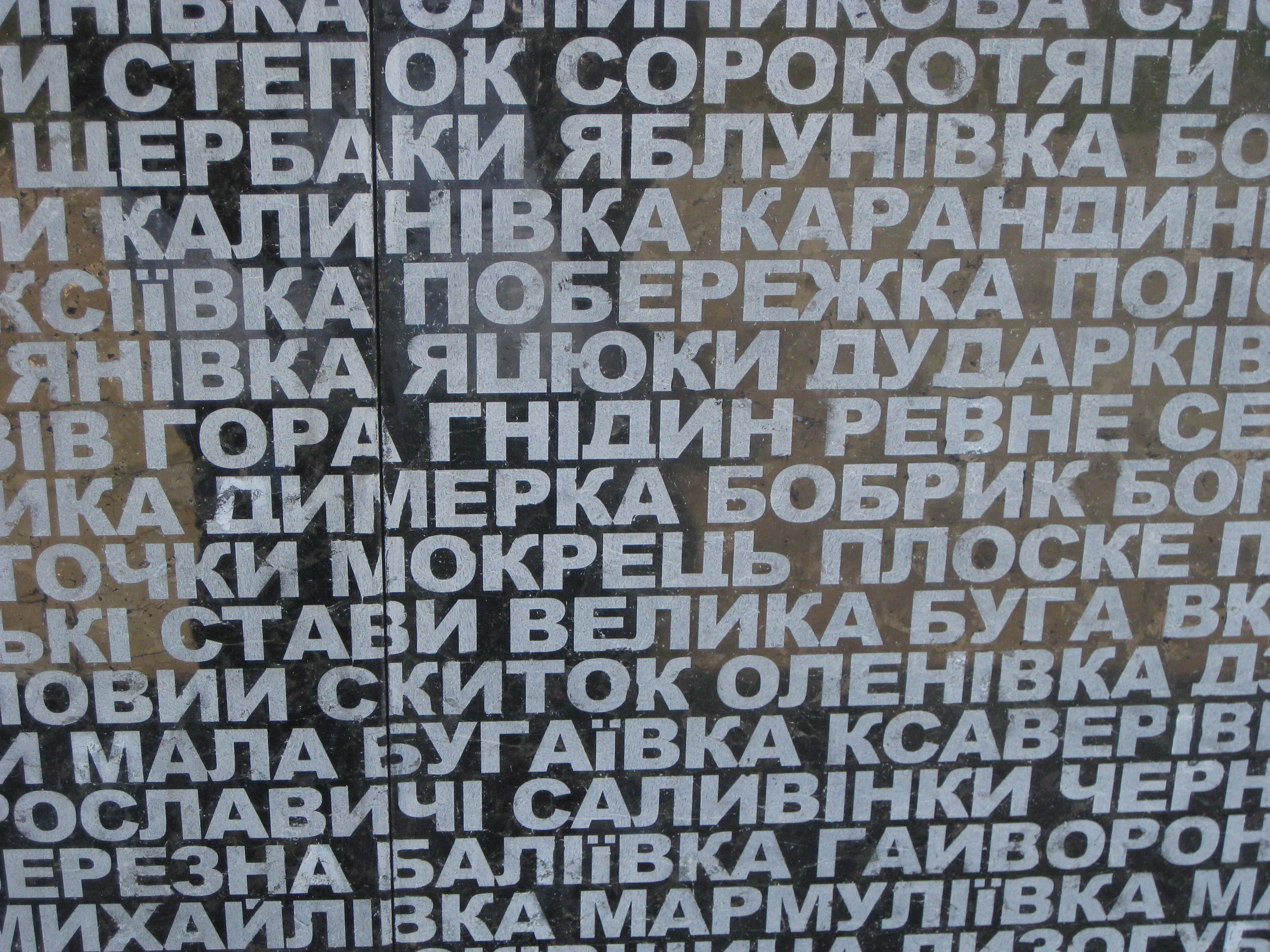
Names of settlements affected by the famine

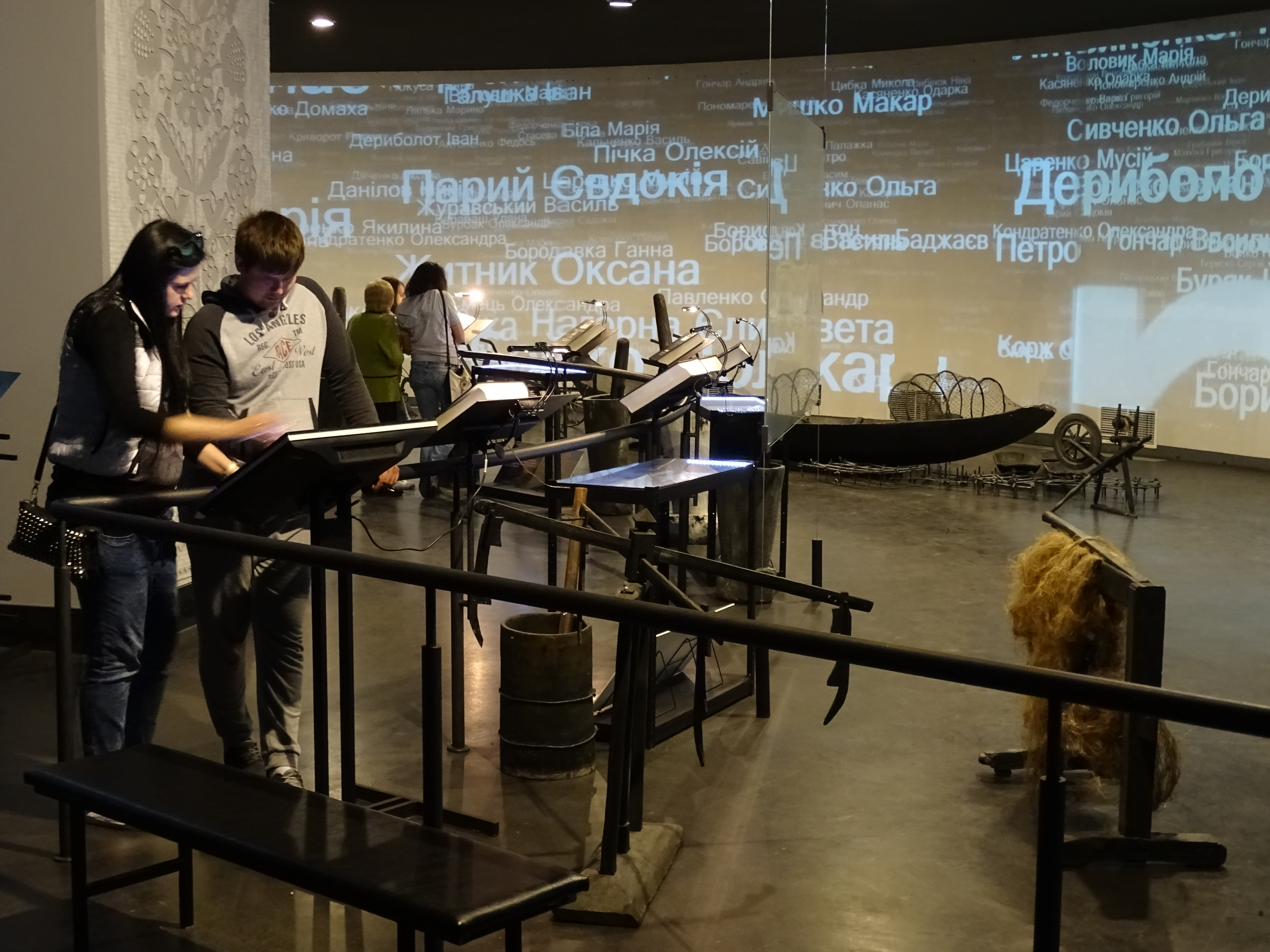
The interior of the National Museum

== See also ==
- Holodomor
- Park of Eternal Glory
- Outline of the Holodomor
- Bibliography of the Holodomor
