= Park of Eternal Glory =

Park-monument of landscape art in Kyiv, Ukraine

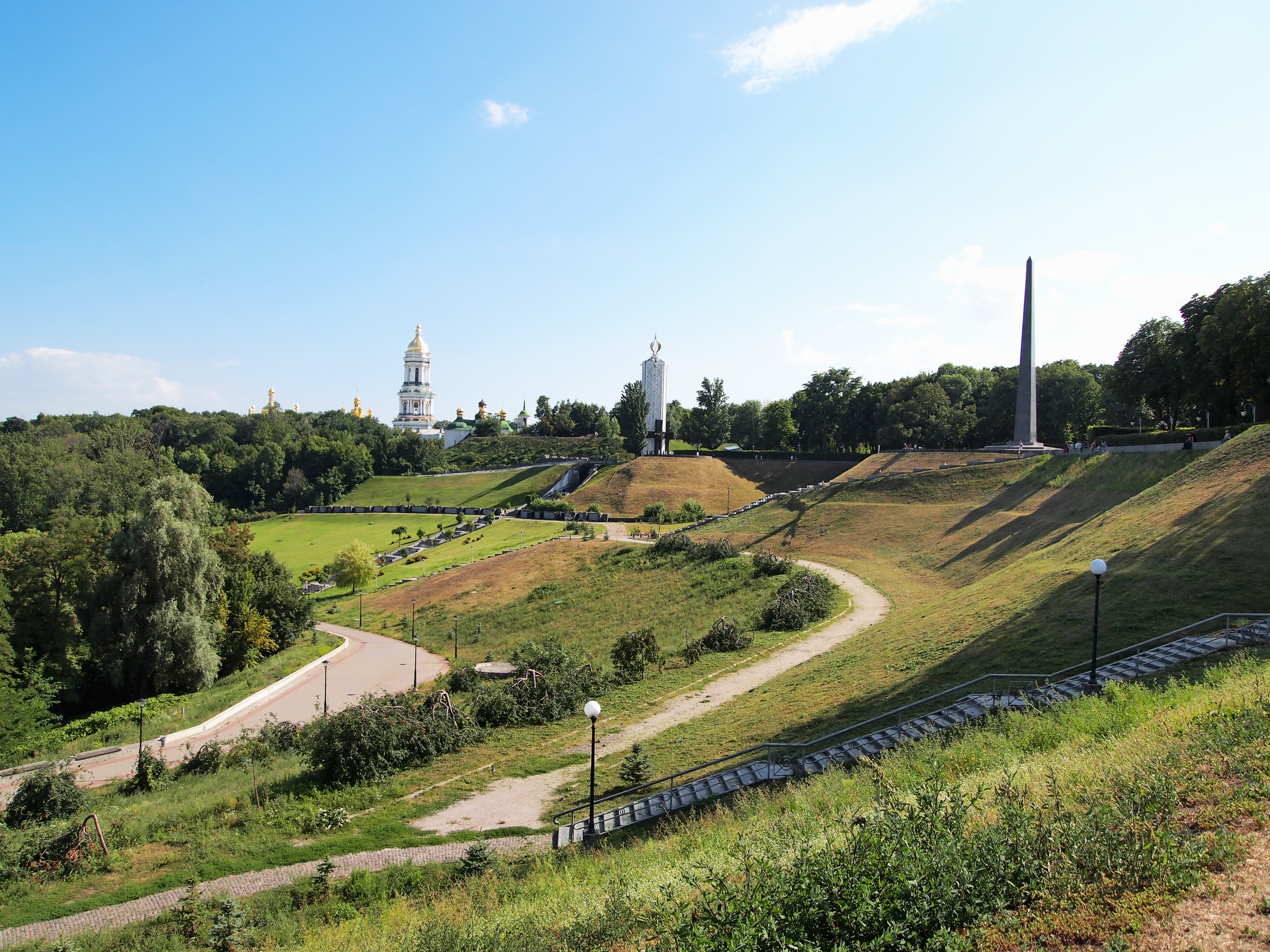
- Interactive map of Park of Eternal Glory
- Location: Kyiv, Ukraine
- Coordinates: 50°26′20″N 30°33′16″E
- Created: 1894
- Status: All year

The Park of Eternal Glory (Ukrainian: Парк Вічної Слави, romanized: Park Vichnoyi Slavy) is a park in Kyiv, Ukraine. It is located between Lavrska Street and the Dnipro Descent, and is surrounded by the Old Kyiv-Pecherska fortress, and the Glory Square.

== Areas ==
- Alley of Heroes
- Memorial of Eternal Glory
  - Tomb of the Unknown Soldier
- National Museum of the Holodomor-Genocide

== History ==
In 1894, the commandant of the Kyiv fortress, Lieutenant General Alexei Anosov began work on streamlining and improvement of this site. In 1957, the Memorial of Eternal Glory was opened inside the park. In honor of the 30th anniversary of the Victory over Nazi Germany in 1945, the Alley of hero cities, which leads from Lavra street to the Tomb of the Unknown Soldier, was formed. In 1984, on the occasion of the 40th anniversary of the liberation of Ukraine from the Nazi invaders, the park was reconstructed. The National Museum of the Holodomor-Genocide welcomed its first visitors on 22 November 2008.

== Gallery ==
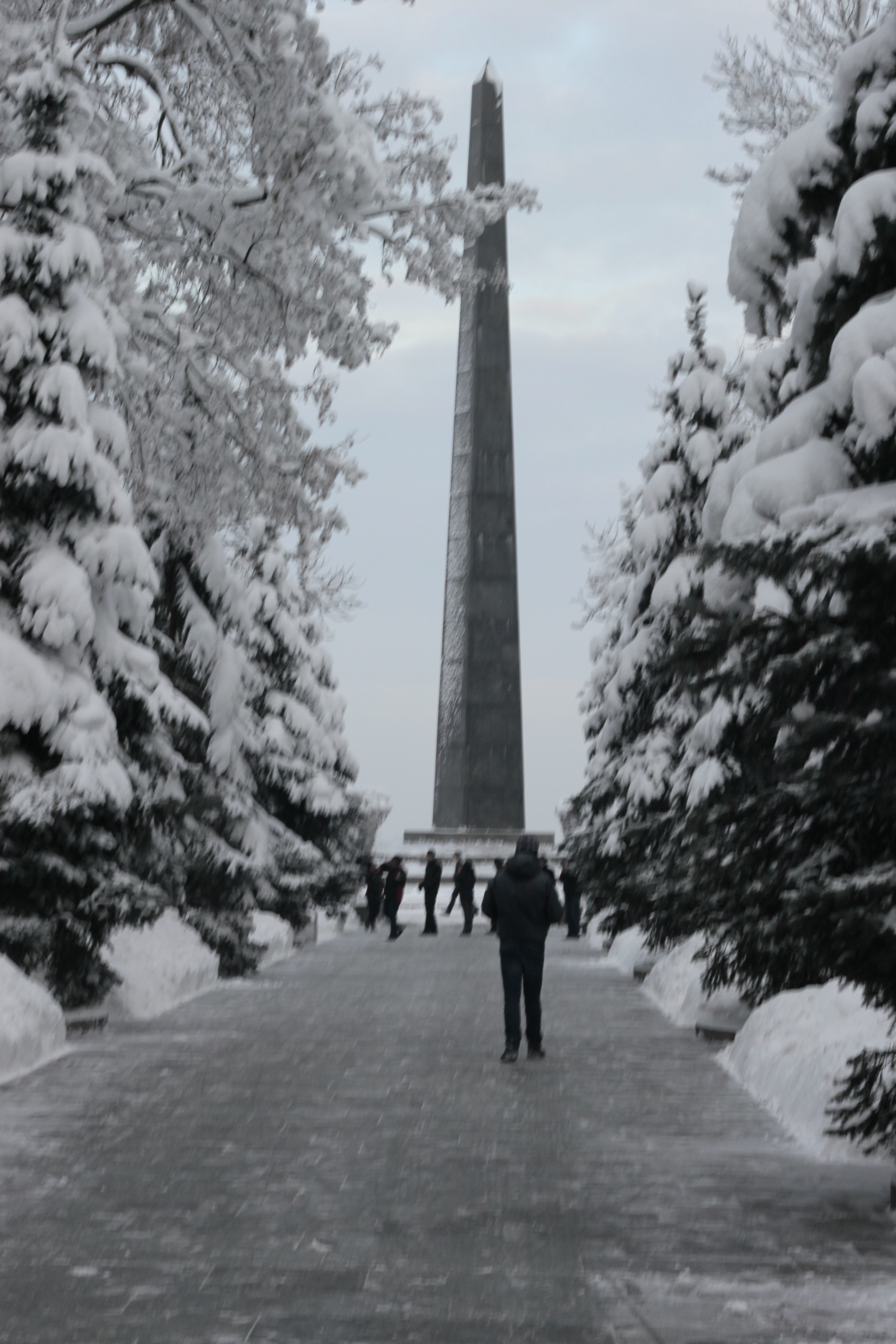

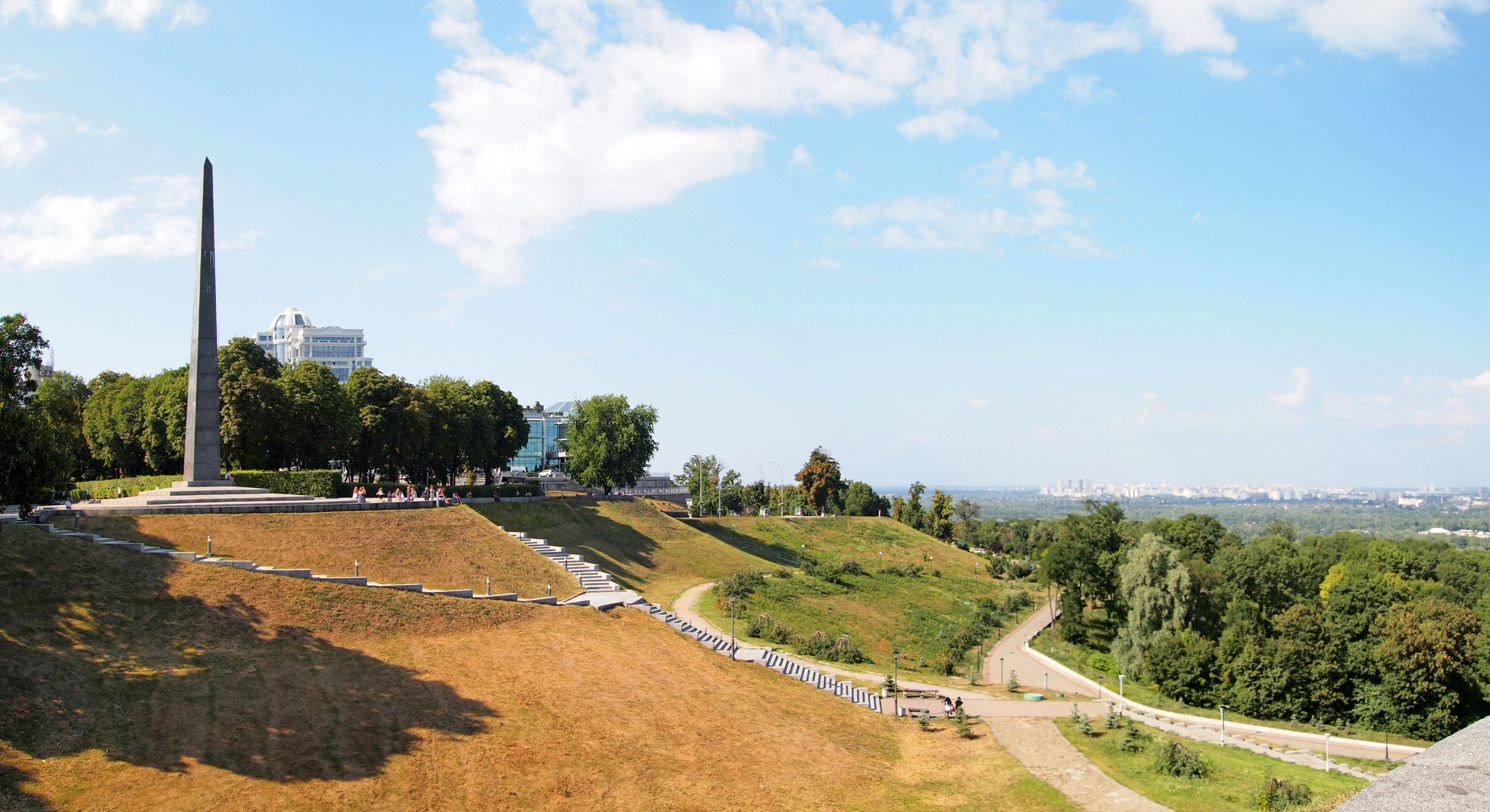

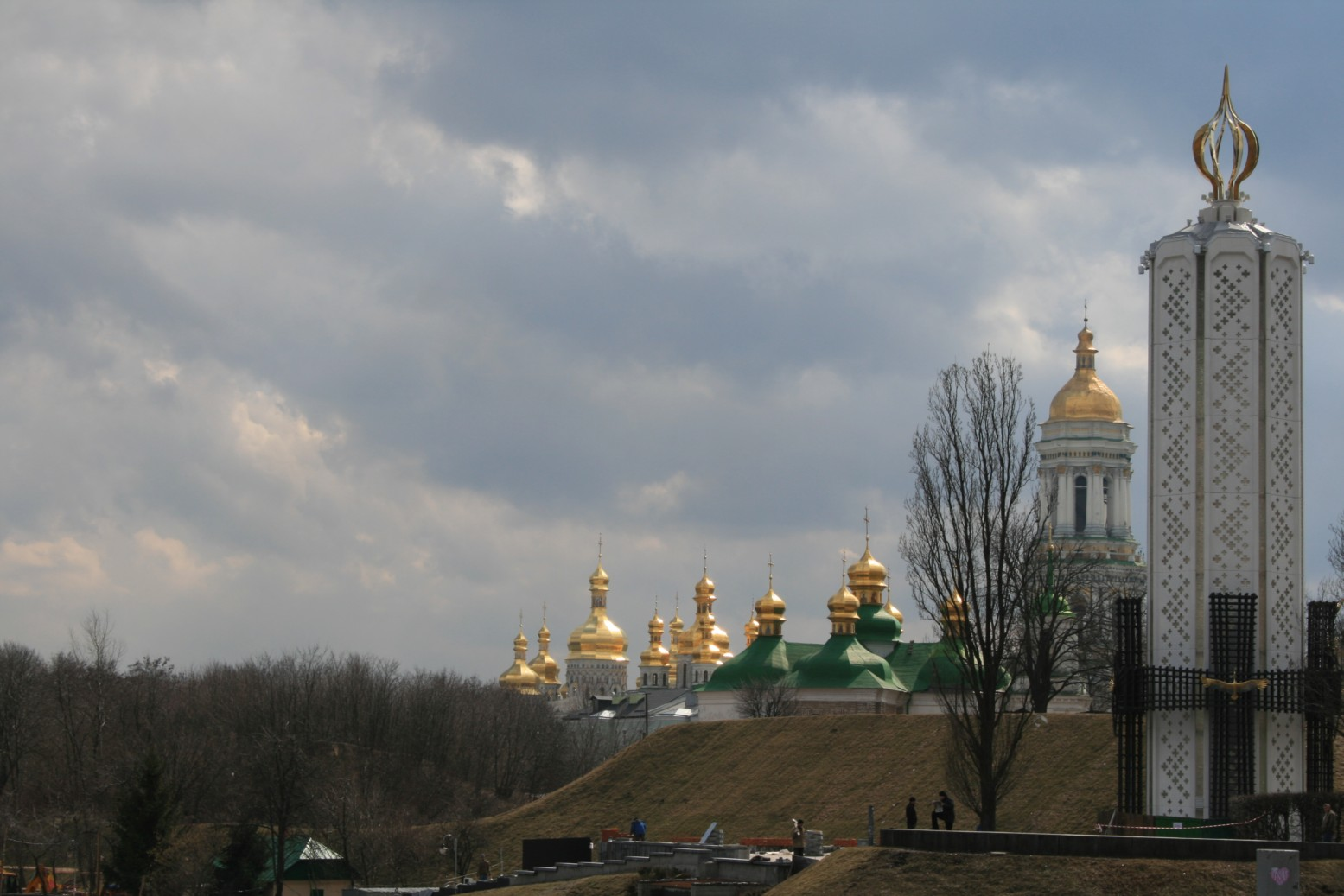

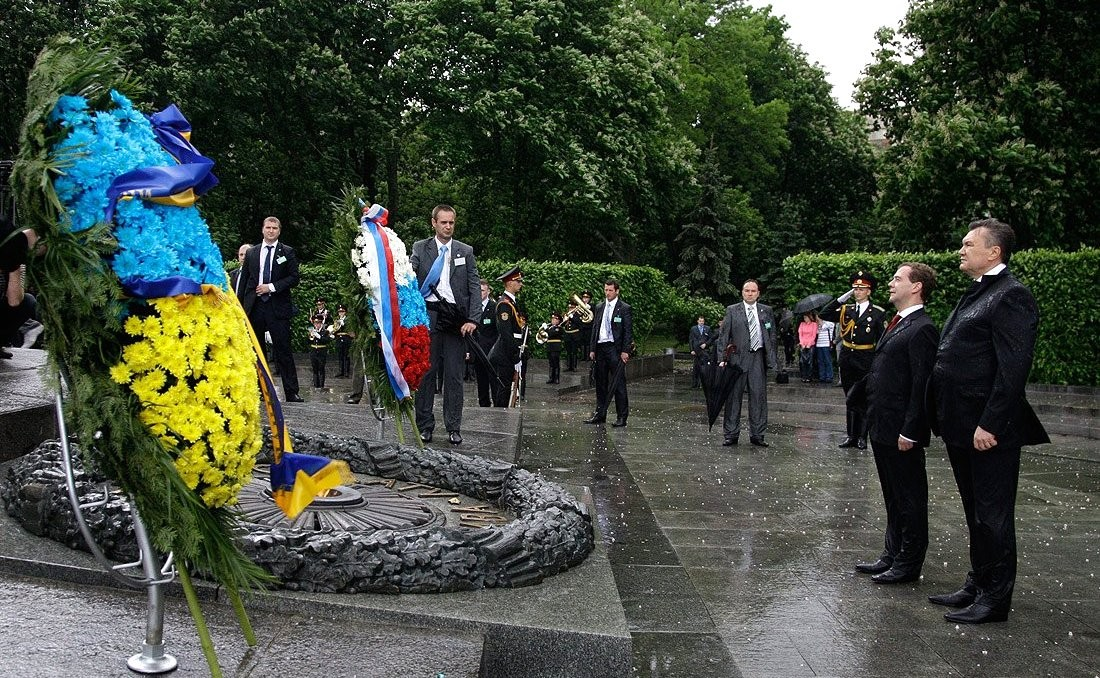

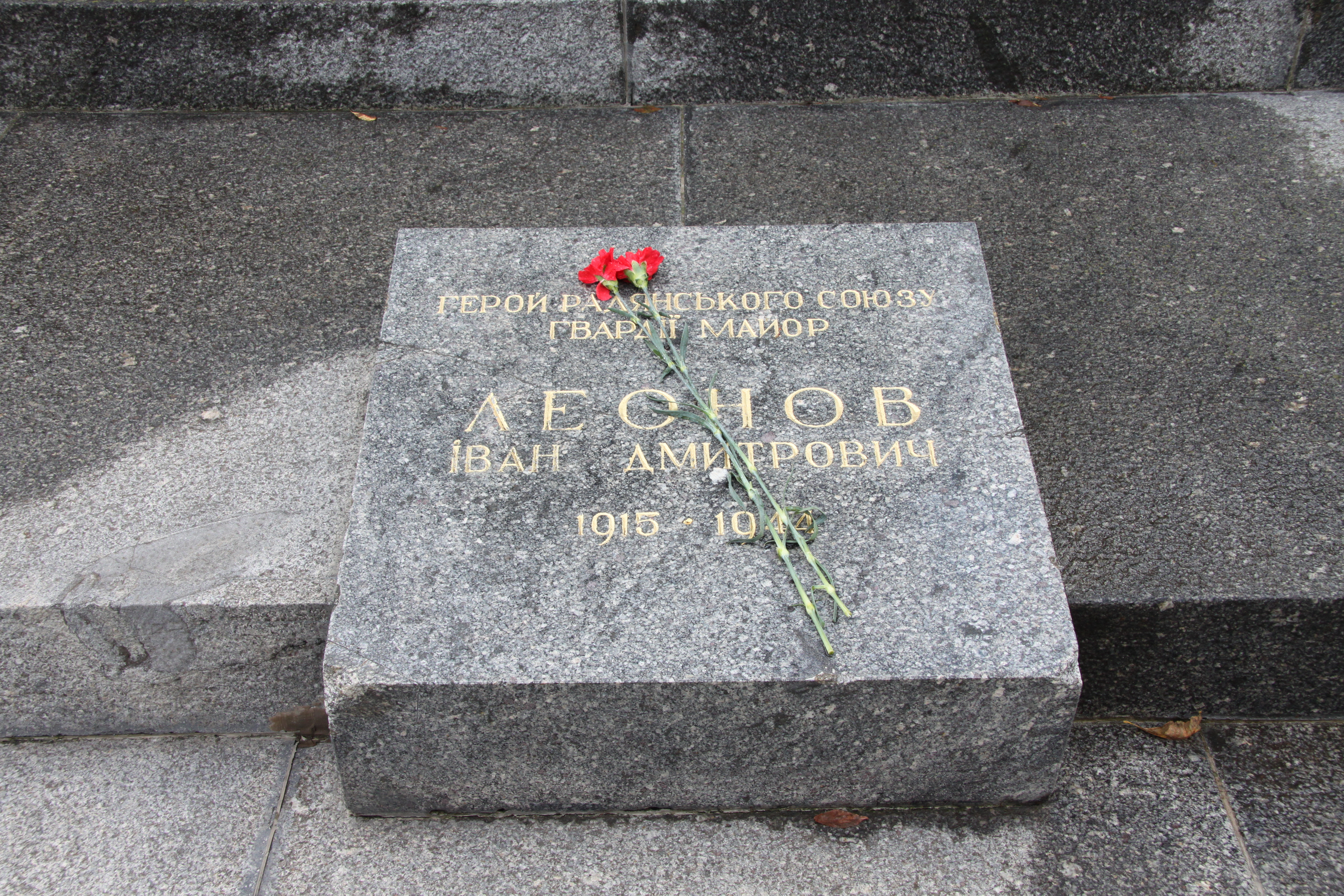

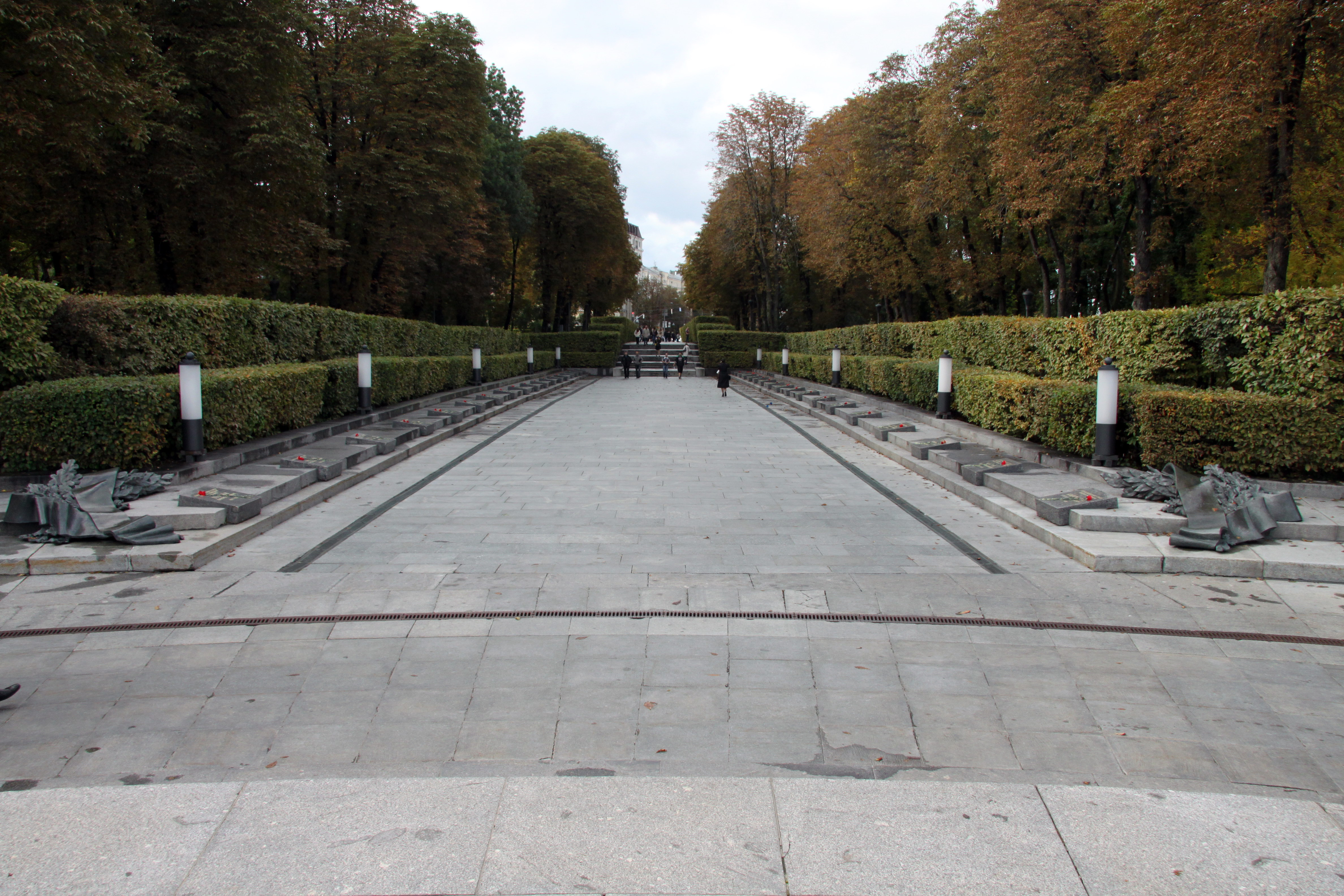
