= Tomb of the Unknown Soldier (Kyiv) =

Monument in Kyiv, Ukraine

Coordinates: 50.4391°N 30.5532°E

The Memorial of Eternal Glory (Ukrainian: Меморіал Вічної Слави) is a war memorial located in the Ukrainian capital of Kyiv, dedicated to soldiers of the Red Army who fought in the Second World War. It is situated inside the Park of Eternal Glory. The memorial is a 27 meters high obelisk, with an eternal flame burning at the Tomb of the Unknown Soldier (Ukrainian: Могила невідомого солдата). The Alley of Heroes leads to the tomb.

== Overview ==
The tomb was opened on 6 November 1957, on the eve of the ruby jubilee of the October Revolution. On 8 May 1967, it was dedicated to the memory of all the unknown Ukrainian soldiers who gave their lives in the Liberation of Ukraine. International dignitaries such as U.S. President Richard Nixon, Azerbaijani President Ilham Aliyev, Lithuanian Prime Minister Algirdas Butkevičius, Russian President Vladimir Putin, and Turkish Prime Minister Recep Tayyip Erdogan have visited and laid wreaths at the tomb. It is official protocol by the State Protocol Department of the Ministry of Foreign Affairs for dignitaries on state visits to lay wreaths at the Tomb of the Unknown Soldier. The British government has annually held Remembrance Day services at the tomb.

Following Ukrainian decommunization laws came into effect in 2015, in 2025 the memorial was modified. The revised design displayed 1939 as the beginning of the Second World War, instead of the original date of 1941.

== Gallery ==
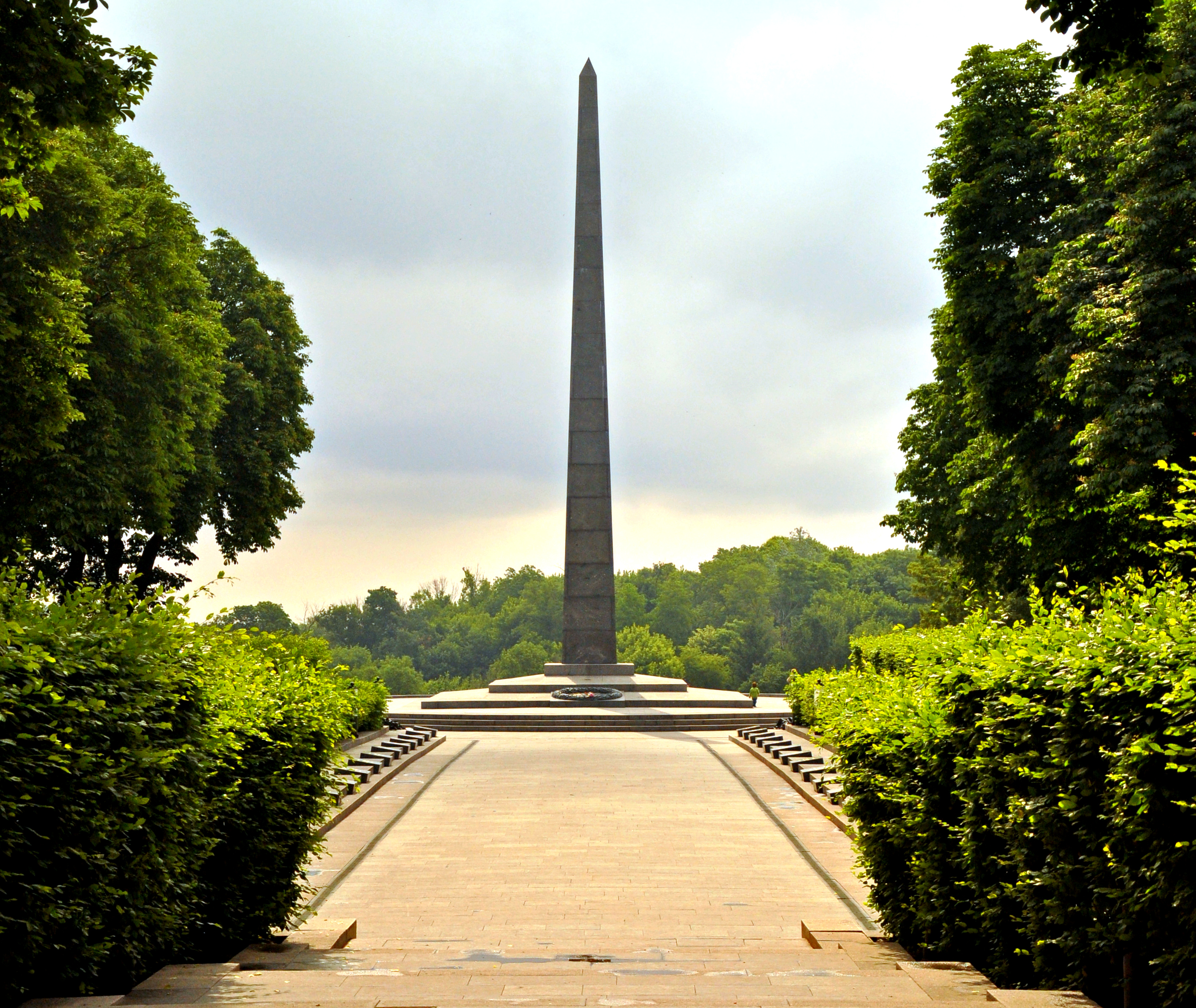
The unknown soldier

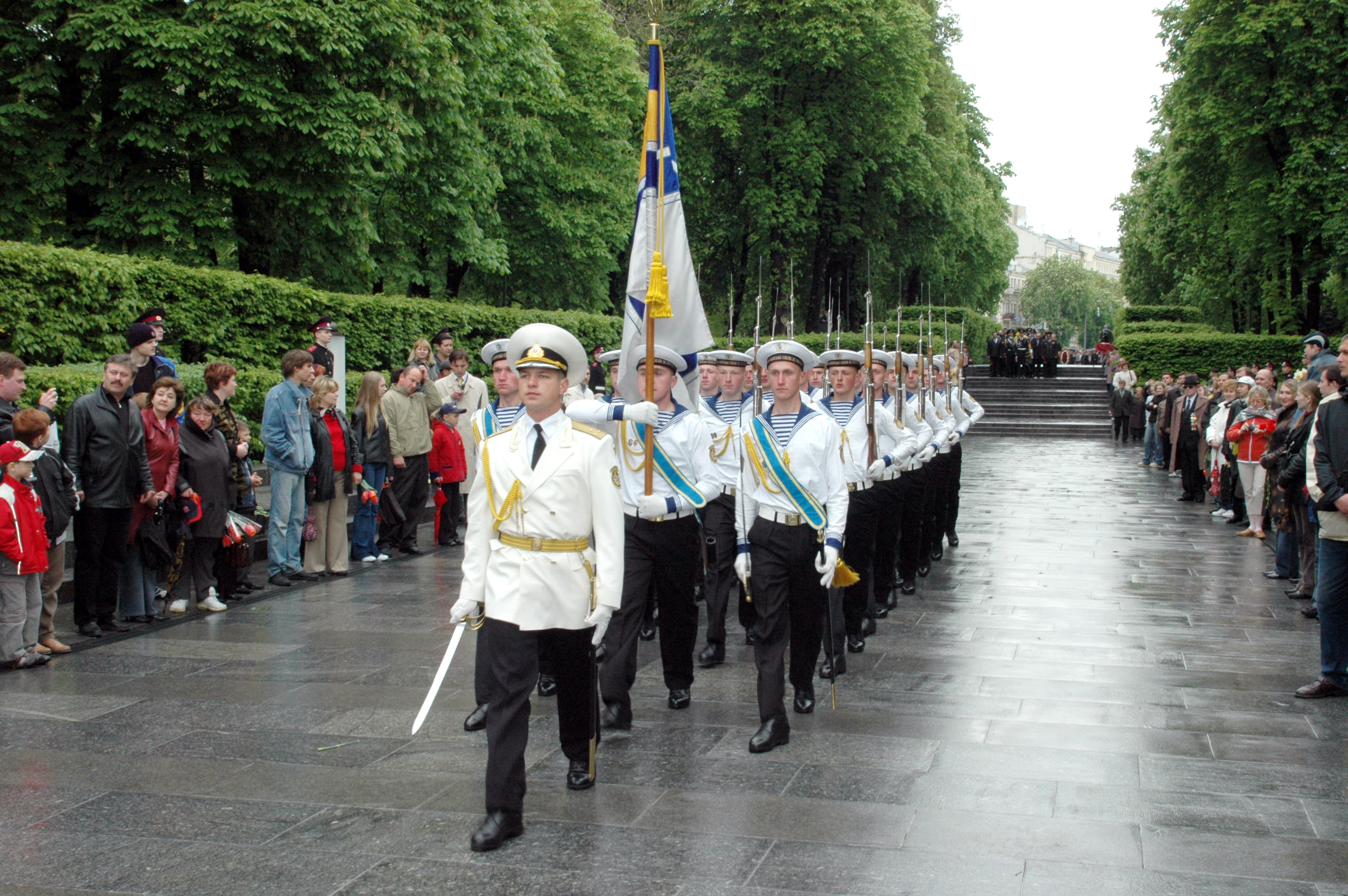
A Ukrainian Navy honor guard marching to the tomb.

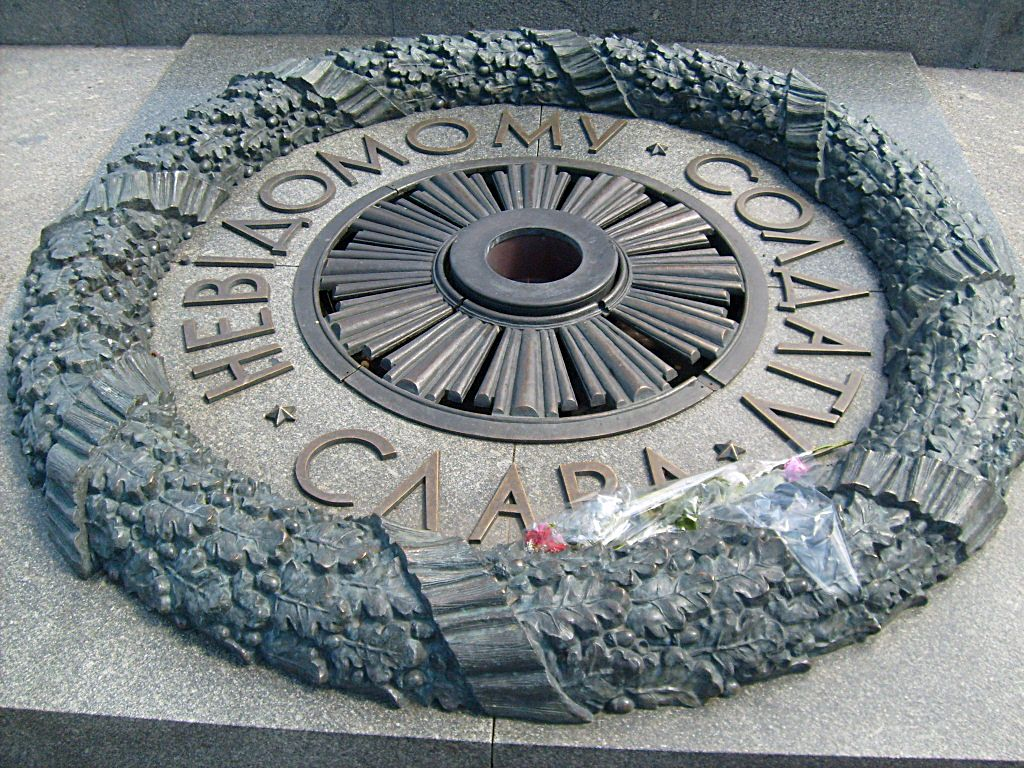
The eternal flame

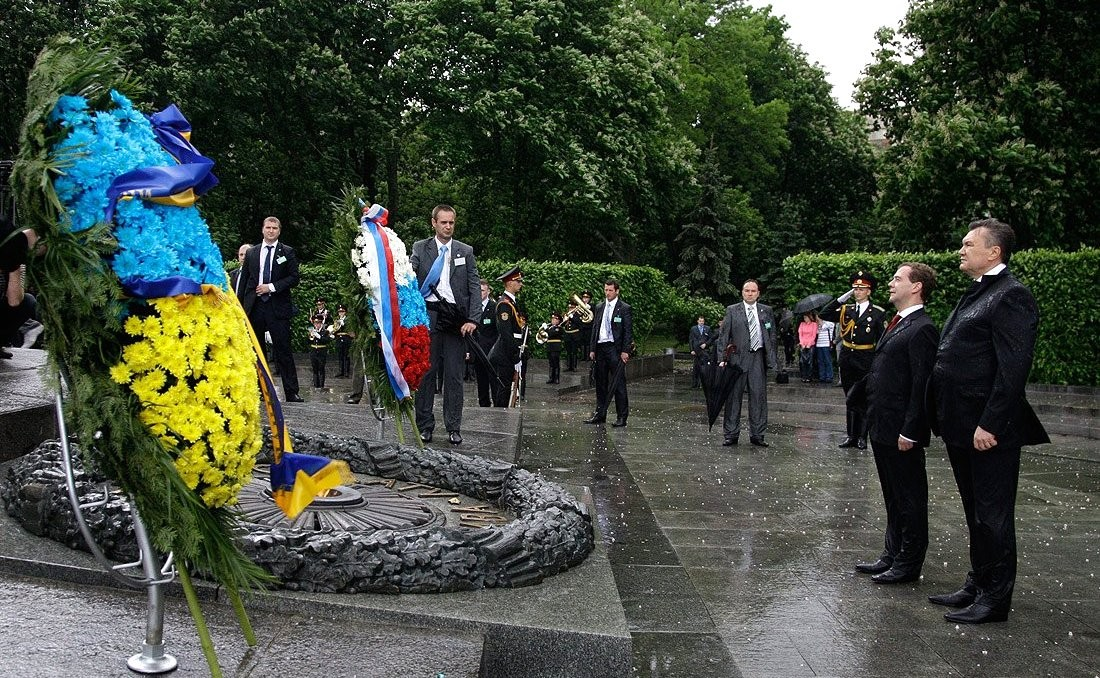
Dmitry Medvedev and Viktor Yanukovich at the tomb.

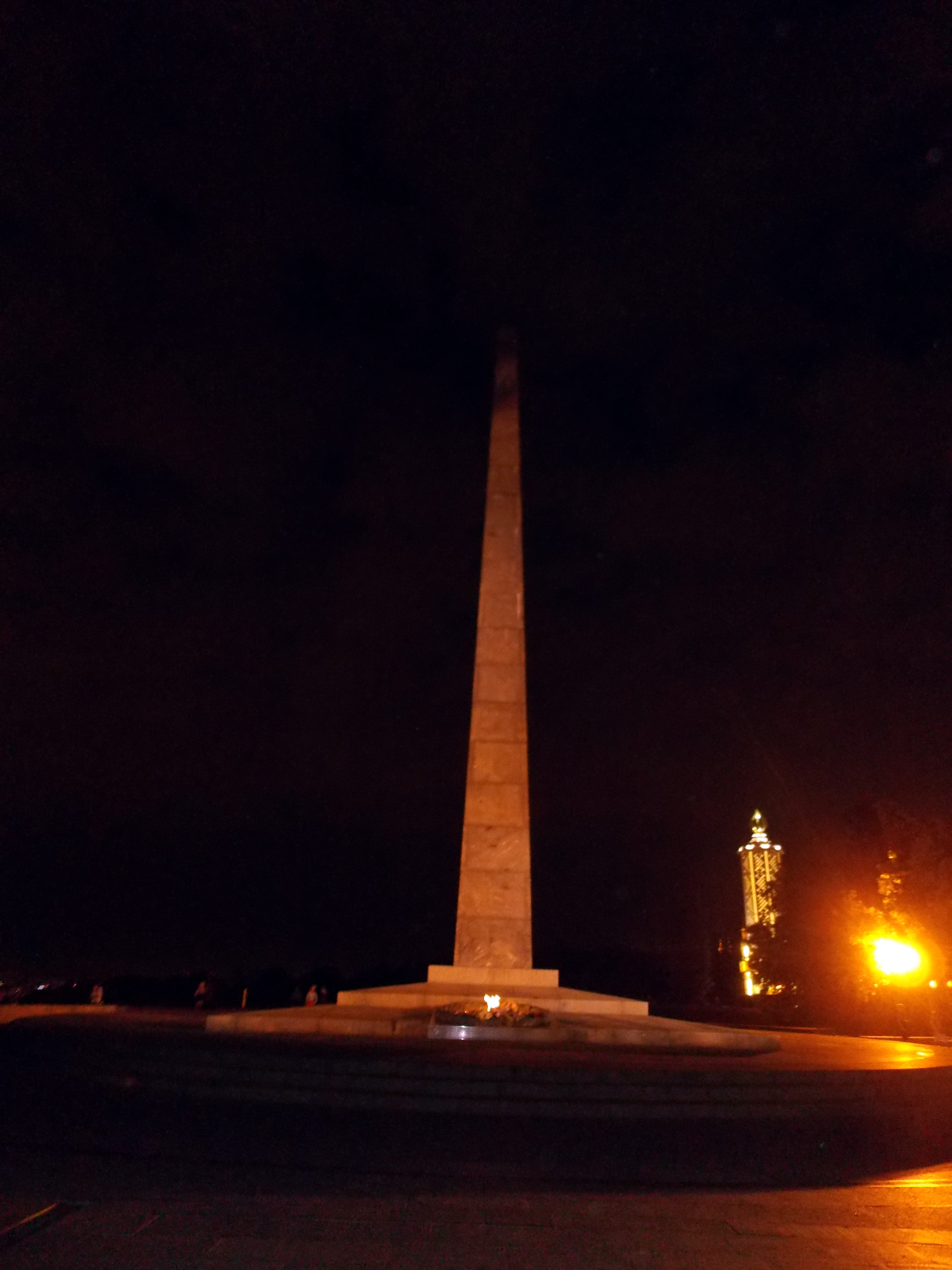
The eternal flame at night.

== See also ==
- Tomb of the Unknown Soldier (Moscow)
- Victory Square (Minsk)
- Eternity Memorial Complex, Chișinău
