= Victory Day over Nazism in World War II =

Former Ukrainian national holiday

- The official symbol for the holiday is the Remembrance poppy.
- Official name: Ukrainian: День перемоги над нацизмом у Другій світовій війні
- Observed by: Ukraine
- Celebrations: non-labour day
- Observances: flowers laying
- Date: 9 May
- Frequency: annual
- First time: 9 May 2015
- Last time: 9 May 2023

Victory Day over Nazism in World War II (Ukrainian: День перемоги над нацизмом у Другій світовій війні, romanized: Den peremohy nad natsyzmom u Druhii svitovii viini) was a national holiday and a non-working day in Ukraine from 2015 to 2023.

The holiday was first celebrated on 9 May 2015 and followed the Day of Remembrance and Reconciliation on 8 May (which paid tribute to the victims of World War II and was also first celebrated in 2015). The holiday replaced Victory Day, which is celebrated in other post-Soviet states.

On 8 May 2023, Ukrainian President Volodymyr Zelenskyy submitted to the Verkhovna Rada (Ukraine's national parliament) a bill establishing May 8, the Day of Remembrance and Victory over Nazism in World War II 1939 – 1945. On 29 May 2023, parliament made the Day of Remembrance and Victory over Nazism in World War II 1939 – 1945 on May 8 as a public holiday, canceling the Victory Day over Nazism in World War II on May 9.

== History ==
On 9 April 2015, the Ukrainian parliament approved a set of decommunization laws which included the annulment of the Soviet law commonly cited as the "Law of Perpetuation of the Great Patriotic War of 1941–1945", which had established Victory Day as a Ukrainian holiday. The holiday was replaced with a new holiday, officially named "Victory Day over Nazism in World War II".

According to Ukraine's decommunization laws, both Communist and Nazi symbols have been prohibited in Ukraine since 15 May 2015, which means that Soviet symbols may not be used during the celebration of this holiday. The term "Great Patriotic War" was itself removed from all official Ukrainian legislation shortly after the change of holiday, and, while not illegal, the phrase "Great Patriotic War" is rarely used due to its frequent use by the USSR, and later, the Russian Federation, with Ukrainian institutions preferring the phrase "World War II".

Ukraine has also worked to shift the narrative of the holiday away from a glorification of war and conflict and instead to "celebrate personal histories", with an aim to "honor, rather than celebrate" the events of the war, in a manner more similar to the United Kingdom's Remembrance Day than to Russia's Victory Day.

On 8 May 2023, Volodymyr Zelenskyy signed a decree according to which Ukraine celebrates Europe Day on 9 May, and submitted to the Verkhovna Rada a bill establishing 8 May, the Day of Remembrance and Victory over Nazism in World War II 1939 – 1945, as a day off instead of Victory Day over Nazism in World War II on 9 May.

On 29 May 2023, the Verkhovna Rada made the Day of Remembrance and Victory over Nazism in World War II 1939 – 1945 on 8 May as a public holiday, canceling the Victory Day over Nazism in World War II on 9 May.

On 12 June 2023, President Zelenskyy signed this law.

According to opinion polling by Kyiv International Institute of Sociology, in 2010 almost 60% of citizens considered Victory Day one of the biggest holidays while in 2022, only 13% of Ukrainians were ready to celebrate 9 May.

=== 9 May as a triple anniversary ===
While 9 May is the general commemoration of the termination of the Second World War and the allied victory in Europe and North Africa, in Ukraine it is in recent years a triple anniversary aside from Europe Day being marked on said date – 9 May being the date of the 1920 Kyiv Polish-Ukrainian victory parade during the Ukrainian War of Independence, the first ever military parade in modern times to be held in the capital following the Polish-Ukrainian Kyiv offensive. No major commemorations of the parade have been held so far, however.

== Celebrations by year ==
=== 2015 ===
The Ukrainian Institute of National Memory have published teaching materials in advance and recommended the holiday be celebrated in a new format. Despite the fact that the law "About perpetuation of the victory over Nazism in World War II 1939 – 1945" officially did not came into force, the holiday in Ukraine officially was celebrated in a format different from Russian formats of celebration of "Victory Day". On this day there were ceremony of laying flowers at monuments to unknown soldiers of the Red Army, in Kyiv – a peace march involving military brass bands from Ukraine, Estonia, Jordan, Lithuania, Poland, and Serbia. It was after the ceremony of oath of cadets in the presence of the President of Ukraine Petro Poroshenko.

The day before, Poroshenko delivered a speech to a Verkhovna Rada filled with veterans of the Red Army, the Ukrainian Insurgent Army, Anti-Terrorist Operation veterans, as well as former presidents of Ukraine (Leonid Kravchuk, Leonid Kuchma and Viktor Yushchenko) and Secretary-General of the United Nations Ban Ki-moon.

For this memorable day the President of Ukraine established a state award by his order – the anniversary Medal "70 Years of Victory over Nazism".

=== 2016 ===
2016 was the first year that the holiday was celebrated as an official holiday (although the first celebrations took place the year before, the law establishing the holiday was adopted a couple days after 9 May).

=== 2017 ===
More than 30,000 police officers were deployed to monitor holiday marches. The 72nd anniversary celebrations coincides with the ceremonies for the Eurovision Song Contest in Kyiv.

=== 2019 ===
President-elect Volodymyr Zelenskyy arranged a meeting in Zaporizhzhia of a veteran Red Army Captain and a veteran of the Ukrainian Insurgent Army.

=== 2020 ===
The 2020 celebrations in honor of the diamond jubilee were cancelled by order of Prime Minister Denys Shmyhal in light of the COVID-19 pandemic in Ukraine. On 7 May, Mayor of Kyiv Vitali Klitschko announced the organization of a planned event in the Park of Eternal Glory with a high security presence. President Zelenskyy went on a working visit to the Luhansk Oblast where he visited an urban settlement that is divided by the border between Ukraine and Russia. In the settlement, he visited the memorial complex "Ukraine to the Liberators". He also visited the Zakarpattia Oblast, where he also laid flowers at the "Hill of Glory" memorial complex. During his holiday address on 9 May, he paid tribute to Ukrainians who fought during the war, including Crimean Tatar Amet-Khan Sultan, American military personnel Alex M. Diachenko and Michael Strank, as well as Hero of the Soviet Union Ivan Kozhedub. Zelenskyy also announced the creation of a memorial project, which would involve the placement of bells in the four corners of Ukraine.

=== 2021 ===
President Volodymyr Zelenskyy took part in a ceremony of honoring the victims of World War II on Glory Square in Kyiv and he laid flowers at the Tomb of the Unknown Soldier (Kyiv), honoring the memory of soldiers killed during World War II.

=== 2022 ===
Amidst the Russian invasion of Ukraine people came out to pay their own tributes at the Tomb of the Unknown Soldier (Kyiv). Ukrainian president Volodymyr Zelenskyy said in his public address that this isn't a war between two countries but two opposing world views. He ended his speech by saying, "We won then, we will win now."

=== 2023 ===
To mark the 78th anniversary of Victory in Europe, President Zelenskyy stated that from 2023 onwards, May 8 will be the new date of the formal commemoration of victory over Nazism in World War II, in line with celebrations of Victory in Europe Day in the European Union and with commemorations in the US and Canada, with May 9 being earmarked as Europe Day in its stead as a commemoration of the 1950 formation of the EU — all as a reaction to the Russian invasion the previous year, a break of the former precedence, and a show of gratitude to the countries that have helped Ukraine resist Russia and its allies. May 8 will remain, though, as the date of the Day of Remembrance and Reconciliation and thus the two holidays were to be merged as one. A Presidential Decree to formalize the transfer of Victory Day to May 8 and renew the Europe Day holiday on May 9 was signed in Kyiv that day.

== Symbols ==
The official symbol of celebration of both Victory Day over Nazism in World War II and Day of Remembrance and Reconciliation is the red poppy (remembrance poppy) flower, which is the common symbol of the memorable days of Second World War all over the world (more recognizable in the British Commonwealth of Nations). It has been used in Ukraine in its own styling developed by Kharkiv designer Serhii Mishakin. The motto of both days is "1939—1945. We remember. We prevail" (Ukrainian: 1939–1945. Пам’ятаємо. Перемагаємо: "Pamyataemo. Peremahaemo").

== See also ==
- 2017 Dnipro clashes
- Liberation Day (Ukraine)
- Time of Remembrance and Reconciliation for Those Who Lost Their Lives during the Second World War

== Sources ==
- Media related to Victory Day over Nazism in World War II at Wikimedia Commons
- Official Website
- Project of bill "On perpetuation of the victory over Nazism in World War II in 1939 — 1945" (in Ukrainian). Verkhovna Rada of Ukraine.
