= Liberation Day (Ukraine) =

Public holiday in Ukraine

Day of Liberation of Ukraine from Fascist Invaders День визволення України від фашистських загарбників
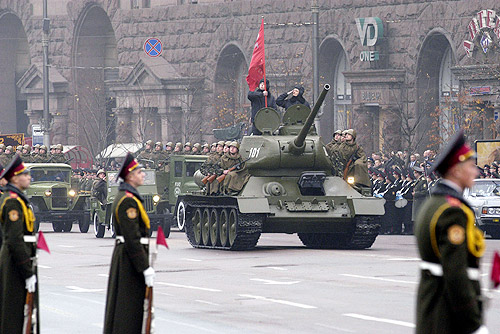
- A Liberation Day parade in 2004.
- Official name: Day of the Liberation of Ukraine from fascist invaders
- Observed by: Ukraine
- Type: National
- Significance: Liberation from Nazi Germany
- Date: October 28
- Next time: 28 October 2026
- Related to: World War II

The Liberation Day of Ukraine (Ukrainian: День визволення України, romanized: Den vyzvolennia Ukrainy), officially the Day of Liberation of Ukraine from Fascist Invaders (Ukrainian: День визволення України від фашистських загарбників, romanized: Den vyzvolennia Ukrainy vid fashystskykh zaharbnykiv), is a holiday celebrated annually on 28 October in Ukraine. It commemorates the Liberation of Ukraine from Nazi Germany on 28 October 1944.

The first settlements in Eastern Ukraine were liberated by the Red Army in December 1942. Major battles for the liberation of the Ukrainian SSR lasted from January 1943 to the autumn of 1944. At this time, half of Ukraine was in the hands of the Red Army. On August 23, 1943, the city of Kharkiv was liberated. On October 27, 1944, Uzhhorod was retaken from the Germans, and Soviet troops arrived at what would be the modern western border of Ukraine. On October 28, 1944, the last territory of current Ukraine (near Uzhhorod, then part of the Kingdom of Hungary) was cleared of German troops; this is annually celebrated in Ukraine (on 28 October) as the "anniversary of the liberation of Ukraine from the Nazis".

== History ==
2004 marked the first time the anniversary was celebrated since independence. A large military parade held on Maidan Nezalezhnosti with the participation of President of Ukraine Leonid Kuchma and Russian President Vladimir Putin. The idea of making the date a national holiday was expressed by the then Minister of Economy of Ukraine Sergey Tigipko on October 15, 2009. Five days later, President Viktor Yushchenko signed a decree establishing the holiday. A couple of days later, planned celebrations took place in accordance with a parliamentary decree signed in January.

On Liberation Day, the country honors of veterans and war dead, often laying wreaths and flowers at memorials. There are often exhibitions and displays of military equipment and military parades of the Armed Forces of Ukraine. Military tattoos and local parades of Military bands take place through the main streets of local cities. Folk festivals and holiday concerts also take place.

== Renaming proposal ==
In 2019, the Ukrainian Institute of National Memory, then led by Volodymyr Viatrovych, proposed renaming the Liberation Day into the "Day of Expulsion of the Nazi occupiers", noting that after 28 October 1944 Ukraine did not become an independent nation, but returned under the control of the Soviet Union. However, such proposal was not adopted.

== Gallery ==
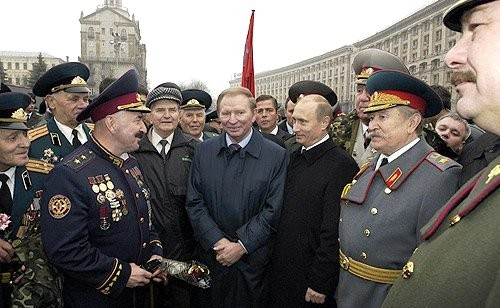
Ukrainian President Leonid Kuchma and Russian President Vladimir Putin during the 2004 celebration.

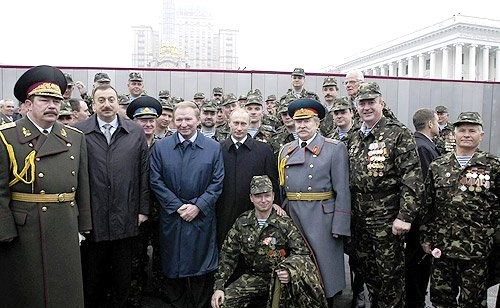
President of Azerbaijan Ilham Aliyev, Ivan Gerasimov, Kuchma and Putin during the 2004 celebration.

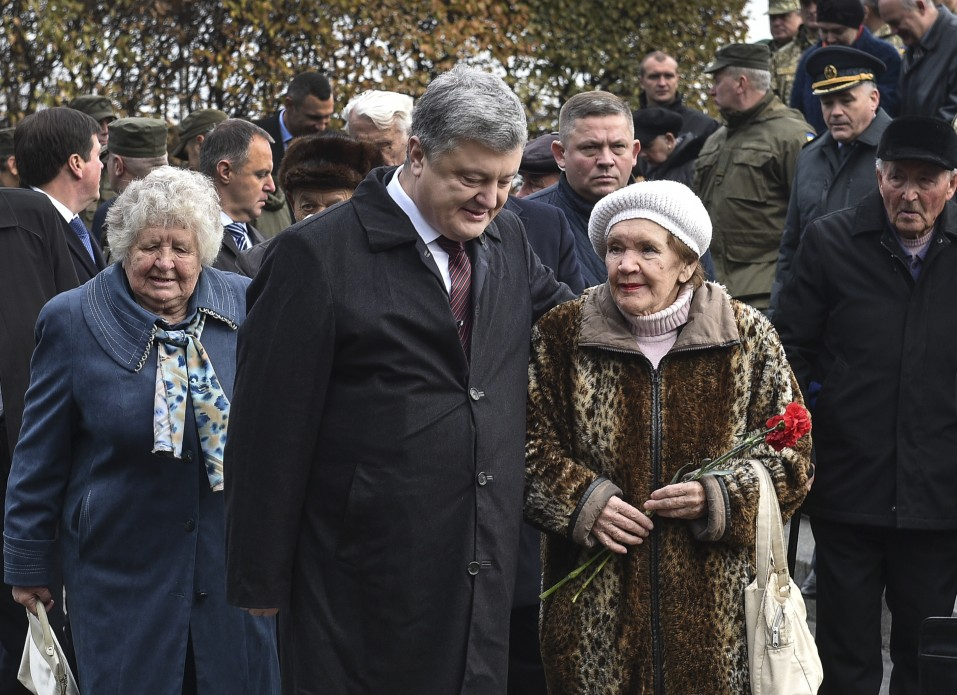
President Petro Poroshenko during a 2017 celebration ceremony.

== See also ==
- 60th Anniversary of the Liberation of Ukraine
- Liberation Day (Moldova)
- Public holidays in Ukraine
- World War II
- Victory in Europe Day
- Victory Day over Nazism in World War II
- Day of Remembrance and Victory over Nazism in World War II 1939 – 1945
