= 2017 Dnipro clashes =

Mass brawl in Dnipro, Ukraine in 2017

- Location: 48.4513°N 35.0713°E; Monument of Eternal Glory, Dnipro, Ukraine
- Date: 5 May 2017; 10:30 a.m. (UTC+3)
- Attack type: Regional enmity in Ukraine, Civil disorder clash between the police officer and the civilis
- Weapons: tear gas, batons, smoke grenades
- Injuries: 14 (8 civilian, 6 police)
- Victim: Donbas war veterans
- Perpetrators: Oleksandr Vilkul; Borys Kolesnikov; Suspects: National Police of Ukraine; Titushky

On 9 May 2017, Victory Day over Nazism in World War II, a fight broke out on in Dnipro, Ukraine. In the morning veterans who had participated in the War in Donbas asked Opposition Bloc supporters at the event to remove the party flag with Soviet connotations and the Ribbon of Saint George, which is illegal in Ukraine, and then conflicts broke out. There are reports that the National Police of Ukraine not only failed to crack down on illegal opposition supporters, but also collaborated with Titushky to help beat soldiers. Witnesses said police used tear gas, smoke grenades and baton attacks during the fights.

The chief of the Dnipropetrovsk Oblast Police, the chief of the Dnipro Police Department and his deputy were dismissed following the incident. Many news reports claimed that the police abused their power and attacked people. However, in the final investigation, no police officers were prosecuted. Subsequent investigations revealed that Titushky, who was accused of joining the police, was organized by Oleksandr Vilkul, the leader of the Opposition Bloc, and each Titushky was paid 600 hryvnia. In the end, one Titushky was suspected of assaulting a member of the Verkhovna Rada and was sentenced to three months in prison, while the others were released without charge.

This incident resulted in 14 injuries, including 8 event participants and 6 security police officers, and 250 people were detained.
