= 60th Anniversary of the Liberation of Ukraine =

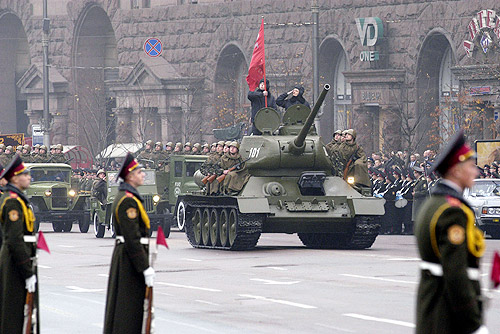
- A T-34 tank carrying the Victory Banner driving onto Independence Square.
- Native name: Ukrainian: 60-й річниці визволення України від фашистських загарбників
- Date: 28 October 2004; 21 years ago
- Duration: 1 day
- Venue: Maidan Nezalezhnosti and Park of Eternal Glory
- Location: Kyiv, Ukraine
- Type: cultural, military
- Organised by: Government of Ukraine, Ministry of Defence
- Participants: Leonid Kuchma, President and Supreme Commander-in-Chief; Viktor Yanukovich, Prime Minister of Ukraine; Oleksandr Kuzmuk, Minister of Defence; Vladimir Putin, President of Russia; Ilham Aliyev, President of Azerbaijan
- Awards: Medal "60 years of the Liberation of Ukraine from the Fascist Invaders"

The 60th Anniversary of the Liberation of Ukraine was a celebration in Kyiv, Ukraine on October 27–28, 2004 on the occasion of the 60th anniversary of the liberation of Ukraine from the Nazi Invaders. It was notable in that it was timed to the 2004 Ukrainian presidential election that occurred a week later. It was the first time the anniversary was celebrated since independence.

== Events on October 27 ==
=== Anniversary parade ===
This was a large military parade held on Maidan Nezalezhnosti with the participation of the Kyiv Garrison of the Armed Forces of Ukraine as well as the Internal Troops of Ukraine. It was held in the same format as the annual Kyiv Independence Day Parade, including the traditional flag raising ceremony to the tune of Shche ne vmerla Ukraina. Inspecting the parade was the Defense Minister General of the Army Oleksandr Kuzmuk and General of the Army Ivan Herasymov, a war veteran who was Chairman of the Verkhovna Rada Committee on Pensioners, Veterans and Disabled Persons. It was commanded by the Commander-in-Chief of the Ukrainian Ground Forces, Lieutenant General Nikolai Petruk. The historical marchpast saw the Ukrainian-made T-34 tank roll on the street, with columns of troops dressed the stylized uniforms of Red Army infantrymen, tankmen, artillerymen, pilots, and sailors passing along Khreshchatyk. The standards of the four Ukrainian as well as the 1st Byelorussian Fronts also were carried along the central street of Kyiv. Veterans of the Soviet offensive (many of which were Heroes of the Soviet Union, Hero of Socialist Labor, and recipients of the Order of Glory) rolled through the square in an open-top UAZs, after which they were seated on chairs under the rostrum, where other high-ranking guests stood. A combined band led by Yuri Kirichenko from Sumy consisting of 30 Ukrainian military bands with a total of 1,000 people stood in front of the main rostrum. Being that a total of 5,000 people participated in the parade, this meant that every fifth participant was a musician. After the parade had passed along Khreshchatyk, a concert lasting 40 minutes took place, with the combined band performing military melodies such as Katyusha, Siny Platochek, and The Sacred War.

=== Other events ===
On October 27, the President of Ukraine together with presidents of Belarus, Russia and Azerbaijan laid wreaths at the Tomb of the Unknown Soldier in the memorial complex of the Park of Eternal Glory in Kyiv. The heads of state participated in a festive event at the Palace "Ukraine". A visit to the National Museum of the History of Ukraine in the Second World War was also arranged.

The Victory Banner was brought to Kyiv from Moscow via train to take part in the parade. From the airport, the Victory Banner was transported to the Museum of the Great Patriotic War. On the evening of October 28, the banner was handed over to representatives of the Russian delegation, who returned it to the Central Armed Forces Museum in Moscow.

== Medal ==
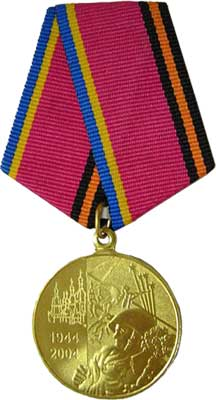
The jubilee medal.

The Medal "60 years of the Liberation of Ukraine from the Fascist Invaders" was awarded throughout the year 2004. The medal was designed by Viktor Buzalo, Deputy Head of the State Awards and Heraldry Administration of the Presidential Administration of Ukraine. The distinction was established by Presidential Decree on September 17, 2004. The President of Ukraine awarded it to participants of hostilities during the Great Patriotic War. The anniversary medal was also and awarded on behalf of the President of Ukraine by the central executive bodies and the Council of Ministers of the Autonomous Republic of Crimea. The Ministry of Foreign Affairs of Ukraine also gave the anniversary medal to citizens of other countries.

== Commemorative coin ==
A commemorative 5 hryvnia coin was issued by the National Bank of Ukraine. The coin was put into circulation on October 27, 2003. The front of the coin depicts the Tomb of the Unknown Soldier while the obverse depicts the Dnieper.

== Attending dignitaries ==
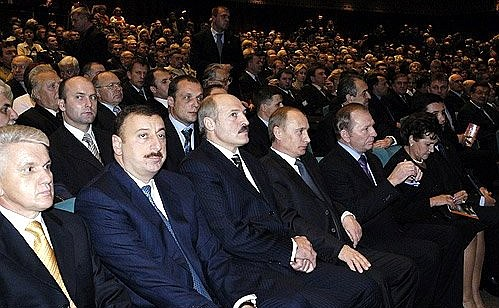
The gala event.

- Ukrainian
  - President of Ukraine Leonid Kuchma
  - Chairman of the Verkhovna Rada Volodymyr Lytvyn
  - Ukrainian Prime Minister and Presidential Candidate Viktor Yanukovych
  - Mayor of Kyiv Oleksandr Omelchenko
- Russian
  - President Vladimir Putin
  - Kremlin Chief of Staff Dmitry Medvedev
  - Ambassador of Russia to Ukraine and Former Russian Prime Minister Viktor Chernomyrdin
  - Gennady Zyuganov, First Secretary of the Central Committee of the Communist Party of the Russian Federation and Leader of the CPRF in the State Duma
- Other
  - Belarusian President Alexander Lukashenko (who left Kyiv before the parade)
  - Azerbaijani President Ilham Aliyev

Kazakh President Nursultan Nazarbayev was also invited to the celebrations.

== Gallery ==
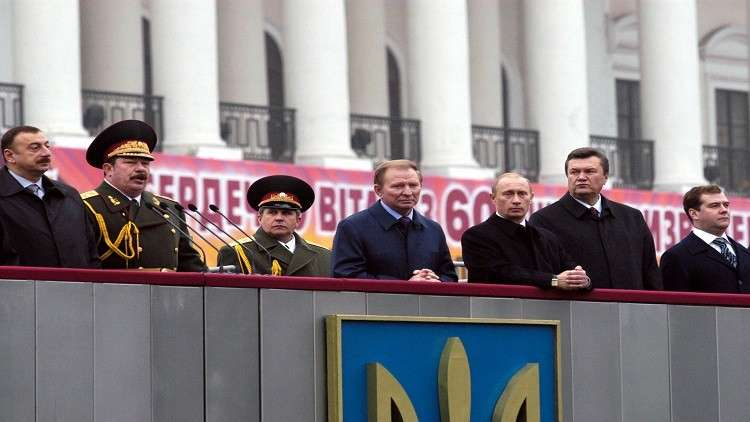
Minister of Defense of Ukraine Oleksandr Kuzmuk delivers a holiday address during the parade

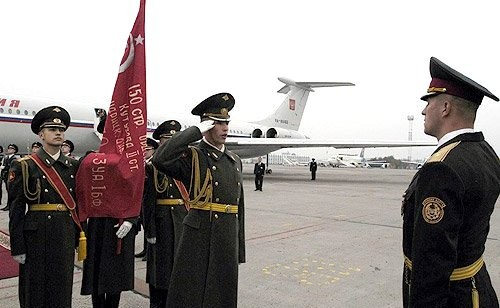

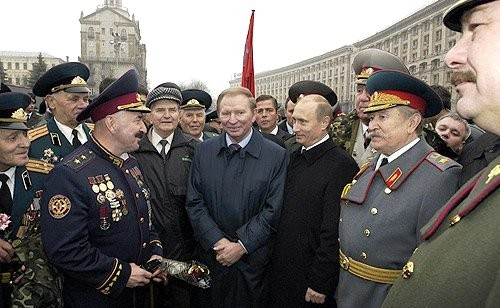

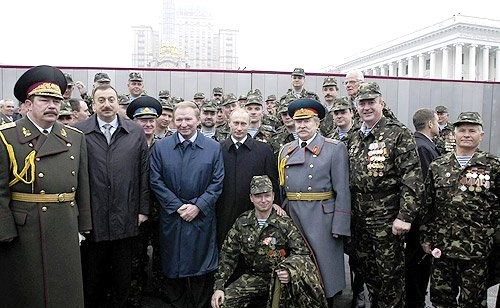
