= Time of Remembrance and Reconciliation for Those Who Lost Their Lives during the Second World War =

World day

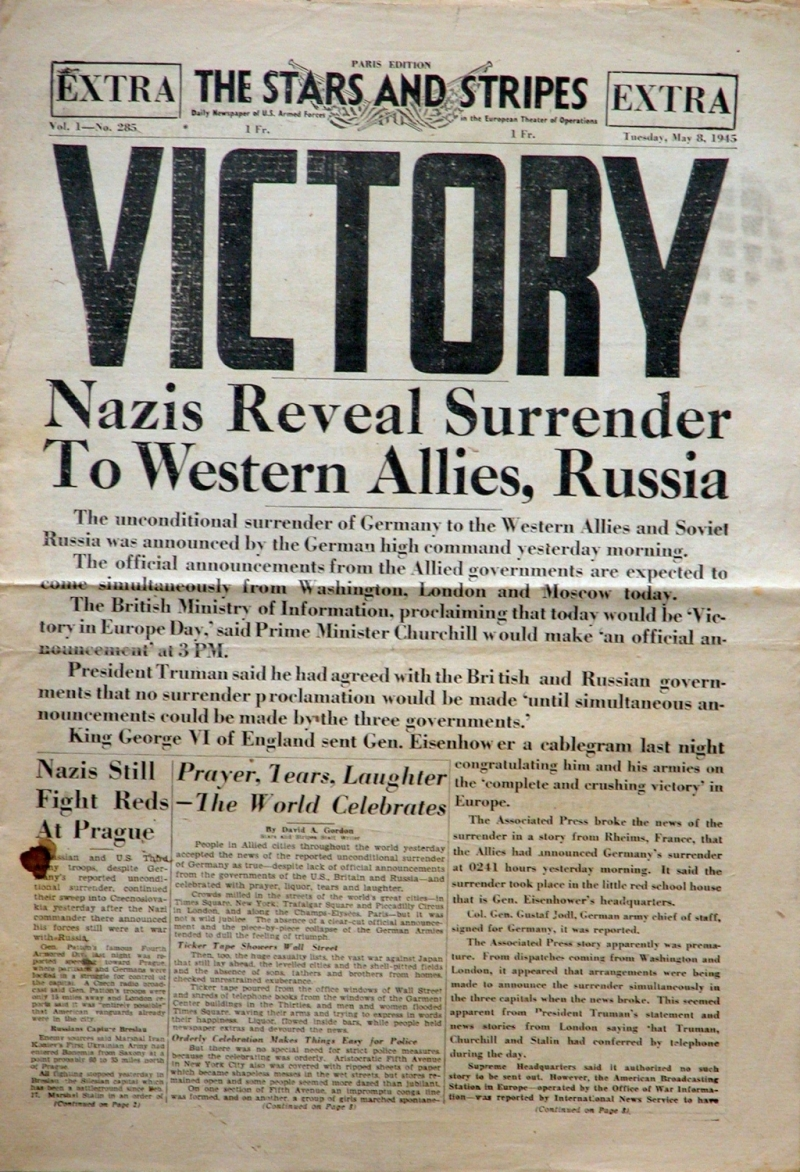
8 May 1945

The Time of Remembrance and Reconciliation for Those Who Lost Their Lives during the Second World War (May 8 and May 9) is an annual international day of remembrance designated by Resolution 59/26 of the United Nations General Assembly on November 22, 2004. The resolution urges 'Member States, organizations of the United Nations system, non-governmental organizations and individuals' to pay tribute to the victims of World War II.

It begins on May 8, the anniversary of the date when the World War II Allies accepted the unconditional surrender of the armed forces of Nazi Germany and the end of Adolf Hitler's Third Reich.

In Ukraine (from 2015 to 2023), May 8 was designated as a day of remembrance and reconciliation, but it was not a public holiday. Since 2024 Ukraine has a public holiday on 8 May, the Day of Remembrance and Victory over Nazism in World War II 1939 – 1945.

== See also ==
- Victory in Europe Day
- Victory over Japan Day
- Remembrance of the Dead
