= Ivan Gerasymov =

Soviet-Ukrainian military commander and politician

Hero of Ukraine Ivan Gerasymov
- Іван Герасимов
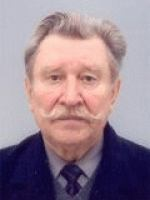
- Official portrait, 2002
- Born: August 8, 1921; Pestrovka, Bashkir ASSR, Russian SFSR, Soviet Union
- Died: June 4, 2008 (aged 86); Kyiv, Ukraine
- Military career
- Allegiance: Soviet Union; Ukraine
- Branch: Soviet Army; Ukrainian Ground Forces
- Service years: 1938–1992
- Rank: General of the Army
- Commands: 1st Guards Tank Army; Kyiv Military District
- Conflicts: World War II
- Awards: Hero of Ukraine; Order of Lenin (2); Order of the Red Banner; Order of the Patriotic War, 1st class; Order of the Red Star (2)

General of the Army Ivan Aleksandrovich Gerasimov (Ukrainian: Іван Олександрович Герасимов, romanized: Ivan Oleksandrovych Herasymov; Russian: Иван Александрович Герасимов; August 8, 1921 – June 4, 2008) was a Soviet general, Ukrainian politician and People's Deputy of Ukraine. He was a member of the Communist Party of Ukraine. Gerasymov was the oldest sitting member of the Verkhovna Rada at the time of his death on June 4, 2008, at the age of 86.

== Biography ==
An ethnic Russian, Ivan Aleksandrovich Gerasimov was born on 8 August 1921. In 1940, he joined the Red Army. From 1940 to 1941 he was a platoon commander in the Odesa Military District. From 1941 to 1942 he was the commander of a tank company on the South and South-Western Front. Throughout the rest of the war, he was the commander of a tank battalion on the North Caucasian Front, commander of a Tank Regiment of Voronezh, 1st Ukrainian Front and Chief of Staff of a Tank Brigade of the 2nd Far East Front.

== Postwar ==
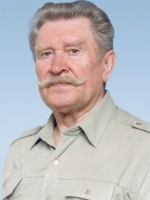
Ivan Gerasymov in 2006

After the war, he attended the Military Academy of Armored and Mechanized Forces in Moscow. He graduated from it in 1955. From 1955 to 1964 he held numerous posts within the framework of divisions. From 1964–1966 he attended the Military Academy of the General Staff of the Armed Forces of the USSR. From 1966 to 1971 he was the commander of the 1st Tank Army. From 1971 to 1972 he was the First Deputy Commander of the Carpathian Military District. From 1972 to 1975 he was the Commander of the Northern Army Group. Then from 1975 to 1984 he was the Commander of the Kyiv Military District. He was made from 1984 to 1990 the Commander in chief of the troops of the South-Western Direction, and in 1986 arrived at the site of the Chernobyl disaster to head Soviet Ministry of Defence efforts there, in succession to General Vladimir Pikalov.

== Post military career ==
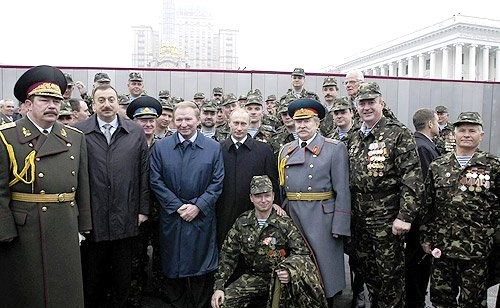
General Gerasymov (third from right, standing in front row) at the 2004 Ukrainian Liberation Day Parade in Kyiv.

From 1990 until his retirement from the army in 1992 he was the Chief Inspector of the Main Inspectorate of the Ministry of Defense. On 3 July 2004, he led the Ukrainian delegation of veterans at the Minsk Independence Day Parade in honor of the Minsk Offensive's diamond jubilee. On 27 October, he inspected the military parade on Maidan Nezalezhnosti in honor of the 60th anniversary of the Liberation of Ukraine along with Oleksandr Kuzmuk.

=== Political activity ===
He was a member of the Communist Party of Ukraine and from 2002 to 2008, he was a people's Deputy of Ukraine. He held the position of head of the subcommittee on legislative support for social protection of war and labor veterans, other elderly citizens of the Verkhovna Rada Committee on Pensioners, Veterans and Disabled Persons.

== Death ==
He died on 4 June 2008 in Kyiv and is buried in Moscow. On 9 May 2010, in honor of the 65th anniversary of the end of the World War II, a memorial plaque was installed in his honor at the building of the Ministry of Defense in Kyiv.

== Military ranks ==
- Major General of Tank Troops (22 February 1963)
- Lieutenant General of Tank Troops (21 February 1969)
- Colonel General (11 April 1973)
- General of the Army (28 October 1977)

== Awards ==
=== USSR ===
- 2 Orders of Lenin
- 2 Orders of the Red Star – February 17, 1943
- Medal "For Courage" – March 30, 1942
- Order of the October Revolution
- Three Orders of the Red Banner
- Order of the Patriotic War, 1st class (1985)
- Order "For Service to the Homeland in the Armed Forces of the USSR" 3rd degree (30 April 1975)

=== Ukraine ===
- Hero of Ukraine (October 27, 1999)
- Full Cavalier of the Order of Bohdan Khmelnytsky
  - 1st degree (May 5, 1999)
  - 2nd degree (March 27, 1997)
  - III degree (May 7, 1995)
- Honorary Badge of Distinction of the President of Ukraine (October 6, 1994)

=== Awards of foreign countries ===
- Order of Polonia Restituta (Poland, 1973)
- Scharnhorst Order (GDR)
- Order "For Military Merit" (MPR, 1971)
- Medal "30 Years of the Bulgarian People's Army" (PRB, 1974)
- Medal "40 Years of Victory over Hitler's Fascism" (PRB, 1985)
- Medal "For Strengthening Friendship in Arms" in gold (Czechoslovakia, 1970)
- Medal "50 Years of the Communist Party of Czechoslovakia" (Czechoslovakia, 1971)
- Medal "Friendship" (Mongolian People's Republic, 1968)
- Medal "50 Years of the Mongolian People's Army" (MPR, 1971)
- Medal "30 Years of Victory over Militarist Japan" (MPR, 1976)
- Medal "20th Anniversary of the Revolutionary Armed Forces of Cuba" (Cuba, 1976)
- Medal "30th Anniversary of the Revolutionary Armed Forces of Cuba" (Cuba, 1986)

== See also ==
- List of members of the Verkhovna Rada of Ukraine who died in office

Military offices
Preceded by post installed	Commander-in-chief of troops of the South-Western Direction; 1984–1989	Succeeded by Vladimir Osipov
Preceded by Grigoriy Salmanov	Commander of the Kyiv Military District; 1975–1984	Succeeded by Vladimir Osipov
Preceded by Magomed Tankayev	Commander of the Northern Group of Forces (in Poland); 1973–1975	Succeeded by Oleg Kulishev
