= Day of Remembrance and Victory over Nazism in World War II 1939–1945 =

Ukrainian national holiday

- The official symbol for the holiday is the Remembrance poppy.
- Official name: Ukrainian: День пам'яті та перемоги над нацизмом у Другій світовій війні 1939 – 1945 років
- Also called: Day of Remembrance and Victory
- Observed by: Ukraine
- Celebrations: non-working day
- Observances: Memorial service, wreath laying
- Date: 8 May
- Next time: 8 May 2027
- Frequency: Annual
- First time: 8 May 2024
- Related to: Ukraine during World War II

Day of Remembrance and Victory over Nazism in World War II 1939–1945 (Ukrainian: День па́м'яті та перемо́ги над наци́змом у Дру́гій світові́й війні́ 1939 – 1945 ро́кі́в, romanized: Den pamiati ta peremohy nad natsyzmom u Druhii svitovii viini 1939 – 1945 rokiv) is a national holiday and non-working day in Ukraine established in 2023. Its first celebration was in 2024. The holiday is celebrated on 8 May and has replaced Victory Day over Nazism in World War II that was previously celebrated on 9 May, from 2015 to 2023.

== History ==
According to opinion polling by Kyiv International Institute of Sociology, in 2010, almost 60% of Ukrainians considered Victory Day (the holiday that commemorated the Soviet victory over Nazi Germany in 1945) one of the biggest holidays. In 2022, following the Russian invasion of Ukraine, only 13% of Ukrainians were ready to celebrate 9 May.

On 8 May 2023, Ukrainian President Volodymyr Zelenskyy signed a decree according to which Ukraine celebrates Europe Day on 9 May, and submitted to the Verkhovna Rada (Ukraine's national parliament) a bill establishing 8 May, the Day of Remembrance and Victory over Nazism in World War II 1939–1945, as a day off instead of Victory Day over Nazism in World War II on 9 May. In a speech that day Zelenskyy stated that, "We are returning to our state an honest history without ideological admixtures." He also stressed that "It was on 8 May that the Act of Unconditional Surrender of the Wehrmacht entered into force."

On 29 May 2023, the Verkhovna Rada made the Day of Remembrance and Victory over Nazism in World War II 1939–1945 a public holiday on 8 May, cancelling the Victory Day over Nazism in World War II on 9 May.

On June 12, 2023, President Zelenskyy signed this law.

On 8 May 2024 the new holiday was first celebrated.

== Symbols ==
The official symbol of celebration of both Day of Remembrance and Victory over Nazism in World War II 1939–1945 and the Time of Remembrance and Reconciliation for the Fallen is the red poppy (remembrance poppy) flower, which is the common symbol of the memorable days of Second World War all over the world (more recognizable in the British Commonwealth of Nations). It has been used in Ukraine in its own styling developed by Kharkiv designer Serhii Mishakin. The official motto is "1939—1945. We remember, We prevail!" (Ukrainian: 1939-1945. Пам’ятаємо. Перемагаємо, romanized: Pamiataiemo. Peremahaiemo)

== Public opinion ==
According to a study conducted by the Kyiv International Institute of Sociology in February 2024, 11% of Ukrainians celebrate Victory Day as the most popular holiday, while Christmas is 70%, Easter is 68% and New Year is 47%. Sociologists note that in 2010, Victory Day on 9 May was one of the most important holidays, as 58% of Ukrainians thought so. However, already in 2021, only 30% of Ukrainians considered it an important holiday. The decline in the popularity of Victory Day in Ukraine is explained by the fact that this day is very actively celebrated in Russia as a militaristic holiday.

== See also ==
- Liberation Day (Ukraine)
- Time of Remembrance and Reconciliation for Those Who Lost Their Lives during the Second World War
