= Victory in Europe Day =

Celebration of the end of World War II in Europe

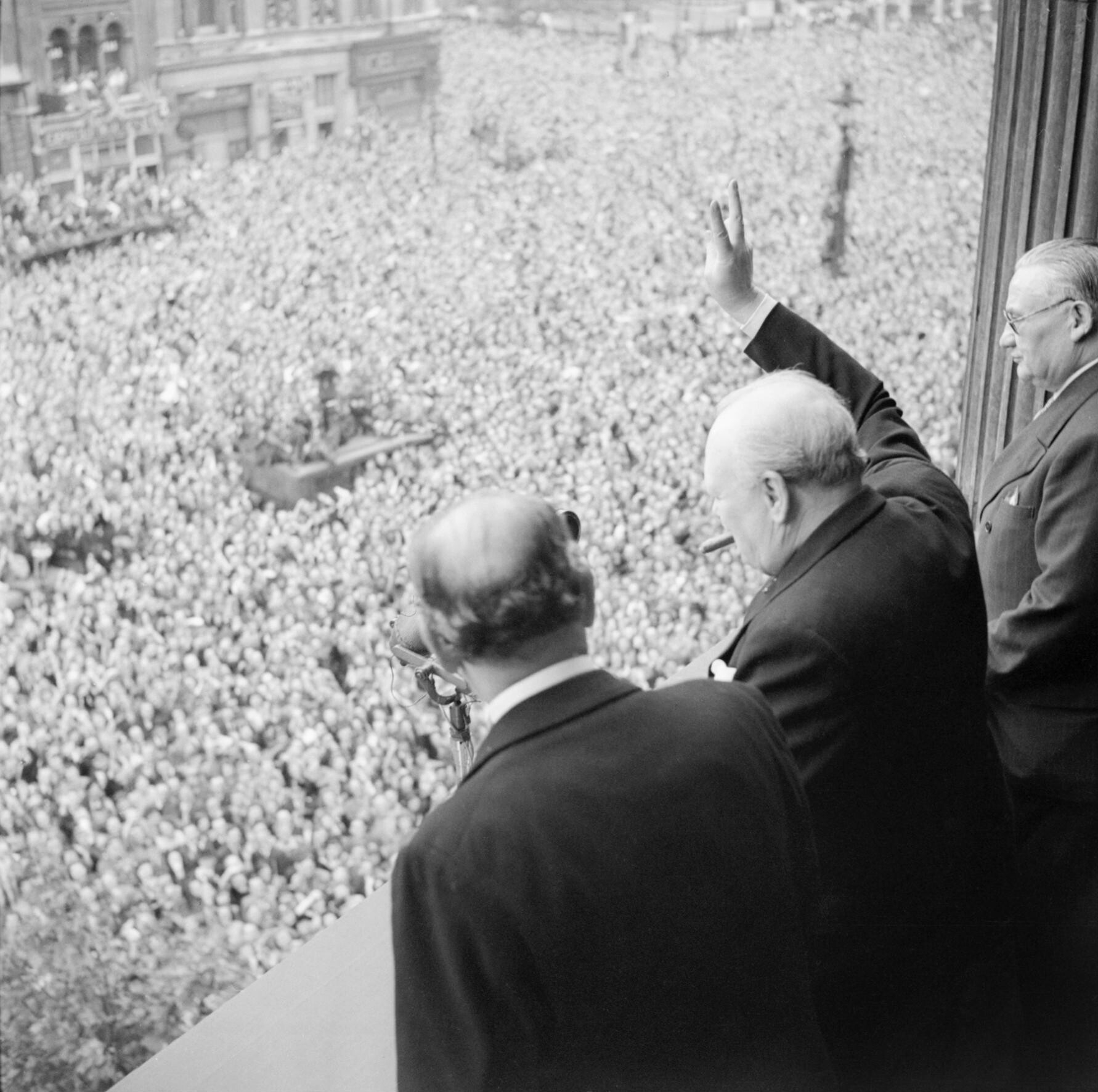
- Winston Churchill waving to the crowds in Whitehall (Parliament Street) on 8 May celebrating the end of the war, showing the V of Victory
- Also called: VE Day; V-E Day
- Observed by: European states; National holiday (8 May): European Union; Observances (8 May): Norway; Ukraine; United Kingdom
- Type: International
- Significance: End of World War II in Europe
- Date: 8 May
- Frequency: Annual
- First time: 8 May 1945; 81 years ago
- Related to: Victory over Japan Day, Victory Day (9 May) and Europe Day

Victory in Europe Day is the day celebrating the formal acceptance by the Allies of World War II of Nazi Germany's unconditional surrender of its armed forces on Tuesday, 8 May 1945; it marked the official cessation of all German military operations.

Russia and some other countries (including several former Soviet states) celebrate on 9 May, as Germany's unconditional surrender entered into force at 23:01 on 8 May Central European Summer Time; this corresponded with 00:01 on 9 May in Moscow Time.

Several countries observe public holidays on the day each year, also called Victory Over Fascism Day, Liberation Day, or Victory Day. In the UK, it is often abbreviated to VE Day, a term which was used as early as mid-1944, in anticipation of victory.

== History ==
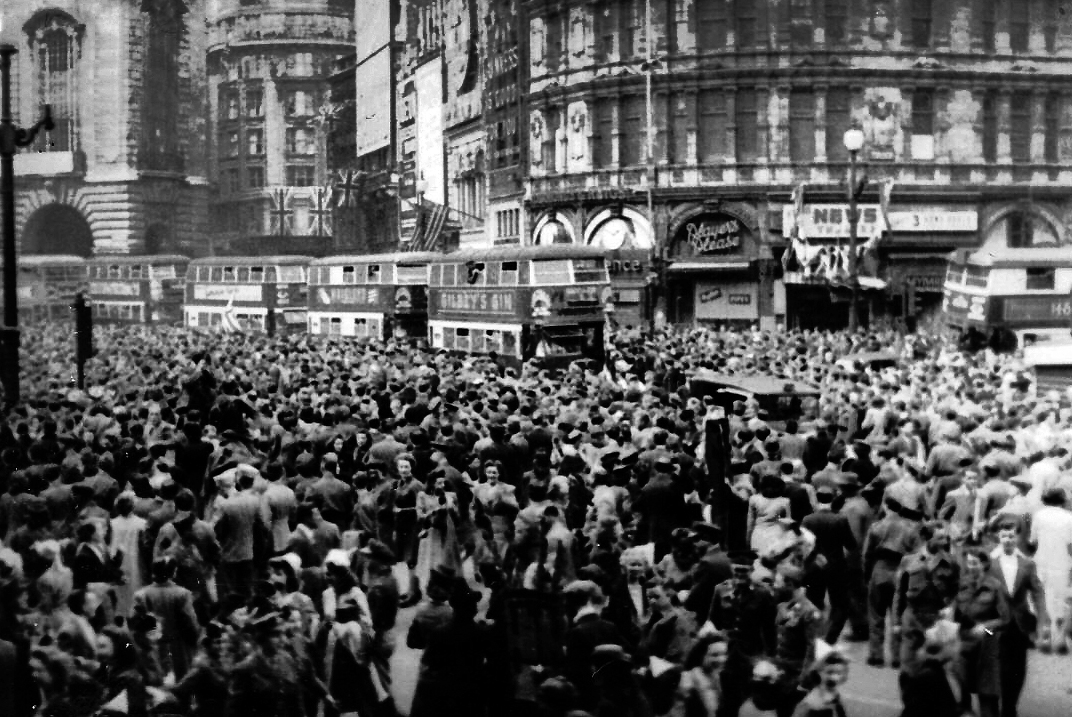
Crowds gathering in celebration at Piccadilly Circus, London during VE Day on 8 May 1945

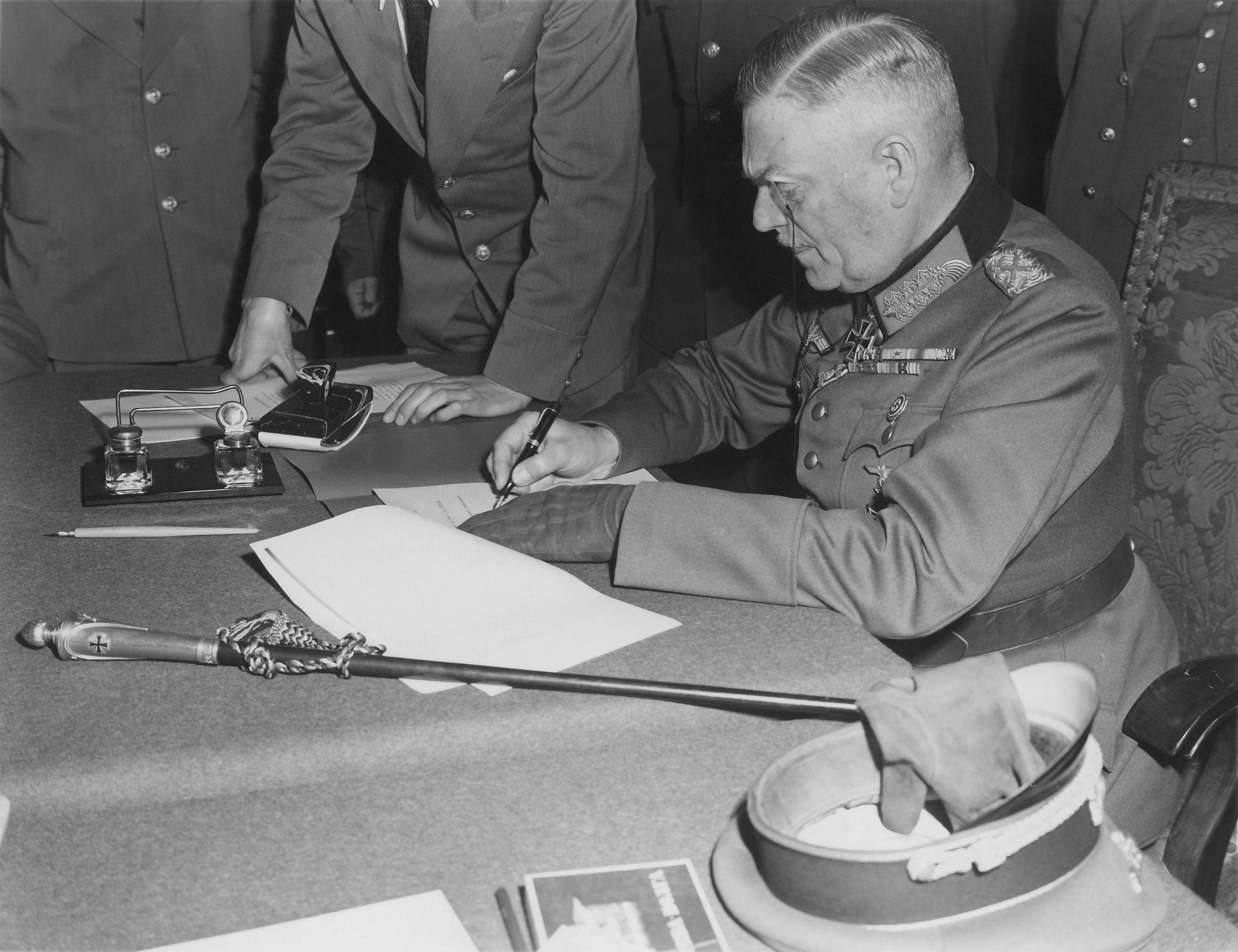
Field Marshal Wilhelm Keitel signing the final surrender terms on 8 May 1945 in Berlin

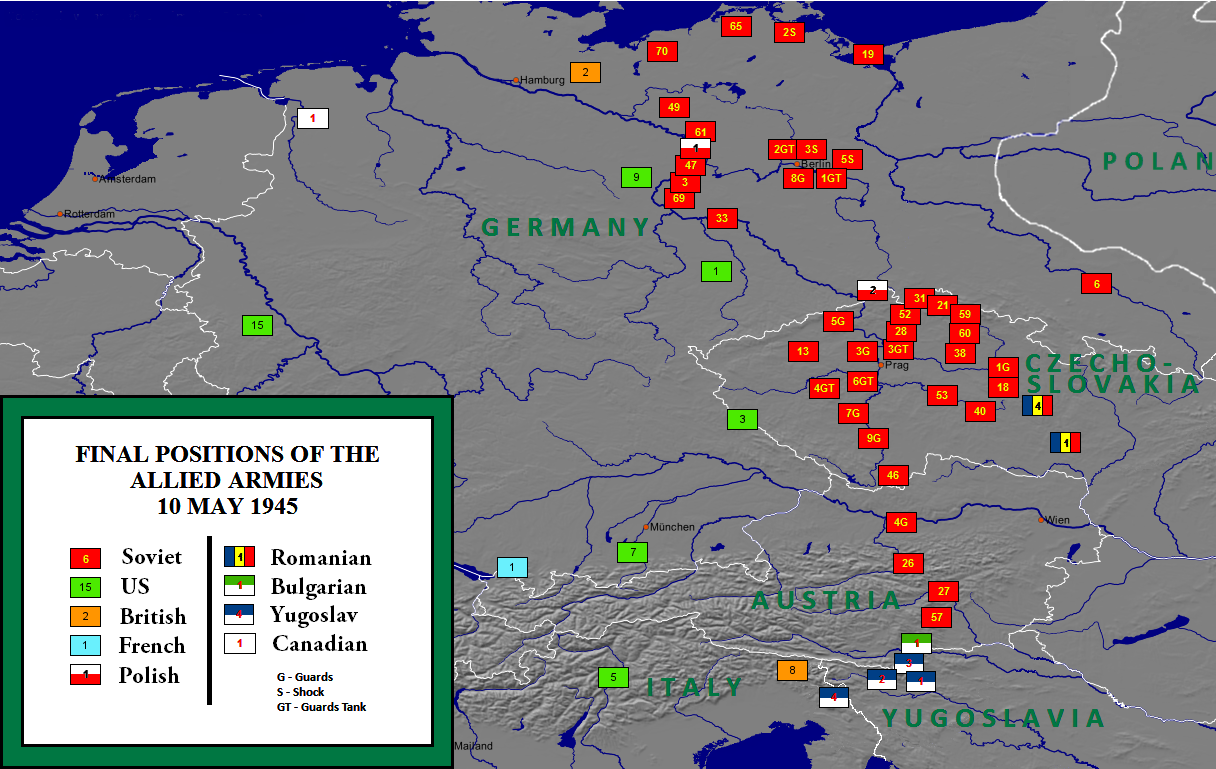
Final positions of the Allied armies, May 1945

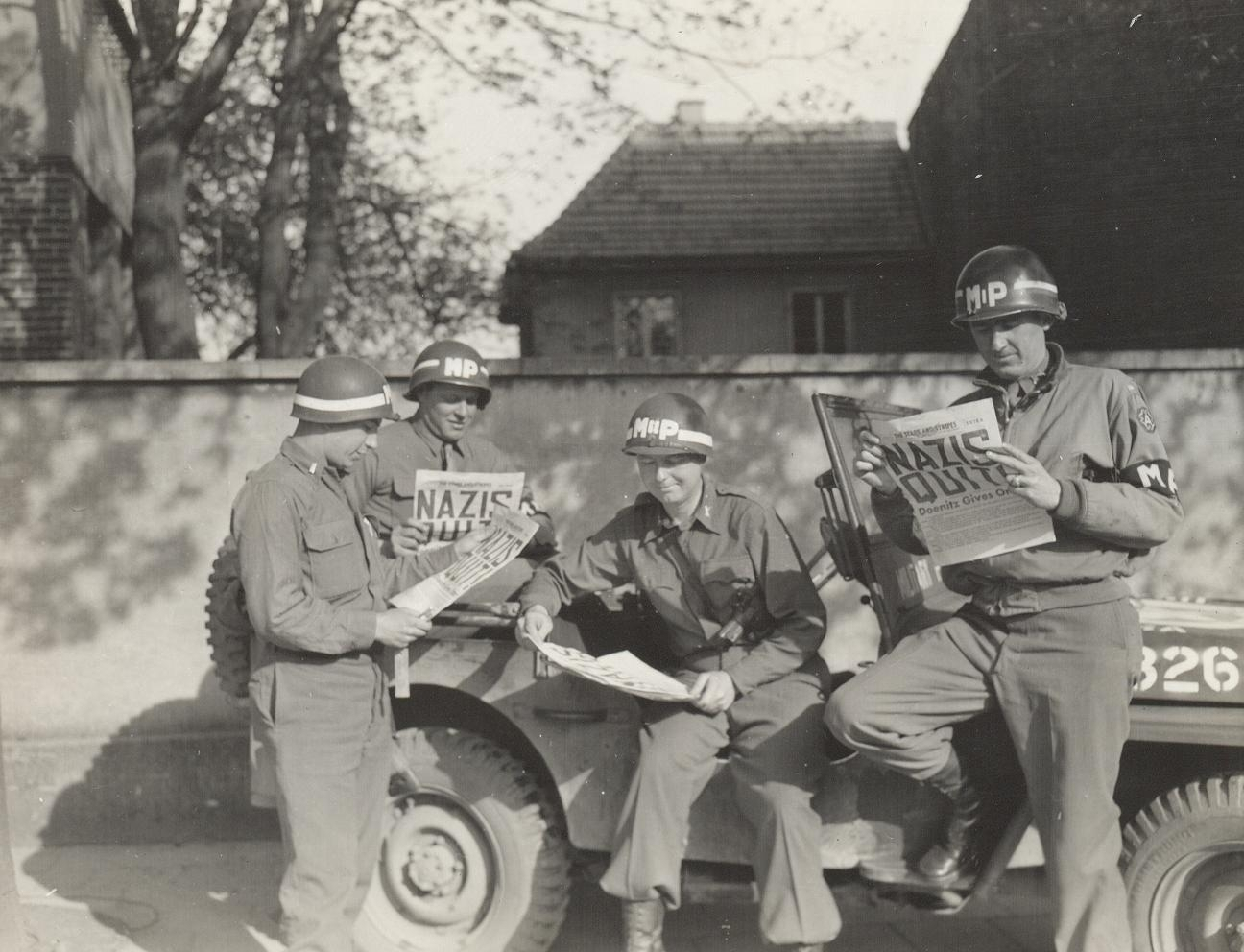
United States military policemen reading about the German surrender in the newspaper Stars and Stripes

Adolf Hitler, the Nazi leader, had committed suicide on 30 April during the Battle of Berlin, and Germany's surrender was authorised by his successor, Reichspräsident Karl Dönitz. The administration headed by Dönitz was known as the Flensburg Government. The act of military surrender was first signed at 02:41 on 7 May at the Supreme Headquarters of Allied Expeditionary Forces (SHAEF) in Reims. A slightly modified document, considered the definitive German Instrument of Surrender, was signed on 8 May 1945 in Karlshorst, Berlin at 22:43 local time.

The German High Command will at once issue orders to all German military, naval and air authorities and to all forces under German control to cease active operations at 23.01 hours Central European time on 8 May 1945...

— German Instrument of Surrender, Article 2,

Upon the defeat of Germany, celebrations erupted throughout the Western world, especially in the United Kingdom, in North America and in the USSR. More than one million people celebrated in the streets throughout the UK to mark the end of the European part of the war. In London, crowds massed in Trafalgar Square and up the Mall to Buckingham Palace, where King George VI and Queen Elizabeth, accompanied by their daughters and Prime Minister Winston Churchill, appeared on the balcony of the palace before the cheering crowds. Churchill went from the palace to Whitehall, where he addressed another large crowd:

God bless you all. This is your victory. In our long history, we have never seen a greater day than this. Everyone, man or woman, has done their best.

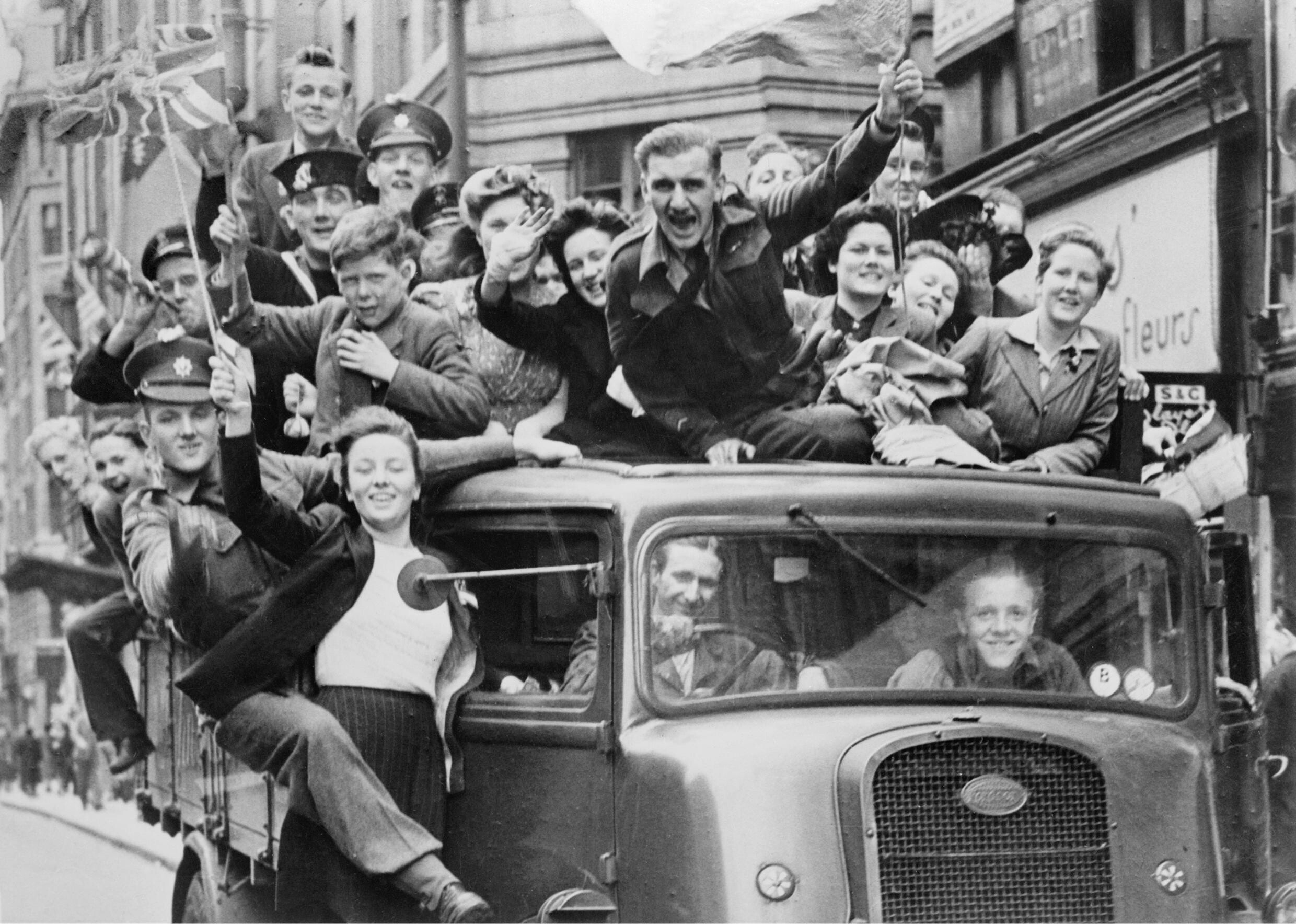
Celebrations in London on 8 May 1945

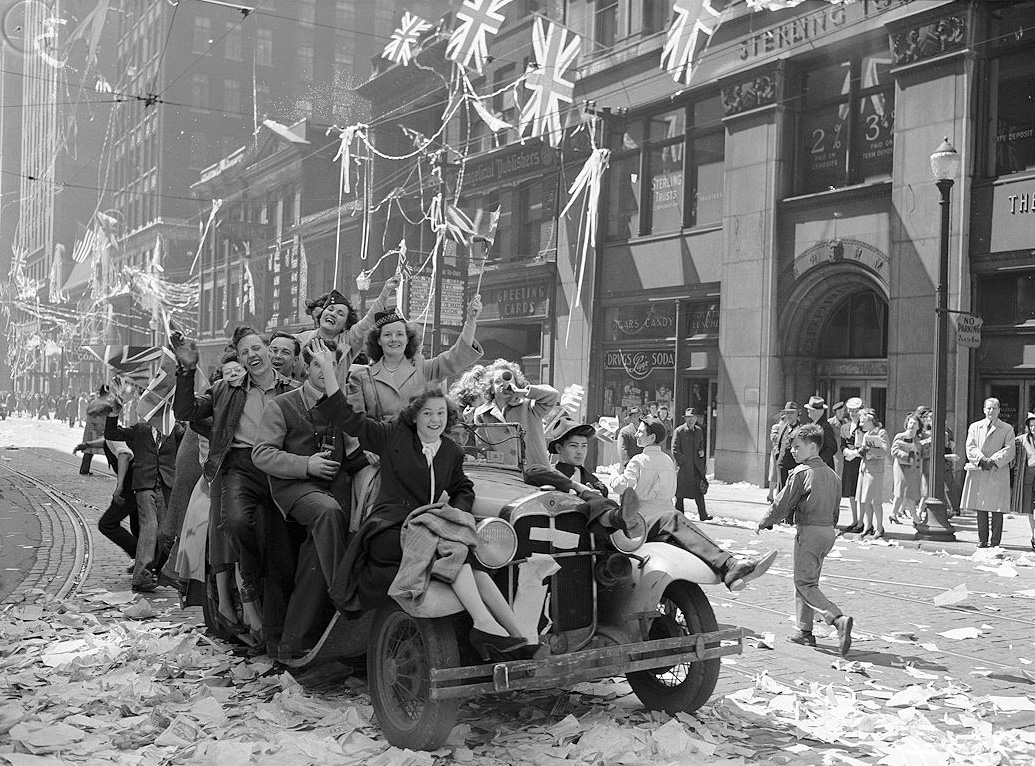
Celebrations in Toronto on 8 May 1945

Churchill asked Ernest Bevin to come forward and share the applause. Bevin said, "No, Winston, this is your day," and proceeded to conduct the people in the singing of "For He's a Jolly Good Fellow". Later, Princess Elizabeth (the future Queen Elizabeth II) and her sister Princess Margaret were allowed to wander incognito among the crowds and take part in the celebrations.

In the United States, the event coincided with President Harry S. Truman's 61st birthday. He dedicated the victory to the memory of his predecessor, Franklin D. Roosevelt, who had died of a cerebral hemorrhage less than a month earlier, on 12 April. Flags remained at half-staff for the remainder of the 30-day mourning period. Truman said of dedicating the victory to Roosevelt's memory and keeping the flags at half-staff that his only wish was "that Franklin D. Roosevelt had lived to witness this day". Later that day, Truman said that the victory made it his most enjoyable birthday. Great celebrations took place in many American cities, especially in New York's Times Square.

Tempering the jubilation somewhat, both Churchill and Truman pointed out that the war against Japan had not yet been won. In his radio broadcast at 15:00 on 8 May, Churchill told the British people, "We may allow ourselves a brief period of rejoicing (as Japan) remains unsubdued". In America, Truman broadcast at 09:00 and said it was "a victory only half won".

== National celebrations ==
VE Day is celebrated across European nations as public holidays and national observances.

=== Austria ===
The Festival of Joy is an Austrian event held in honor of VE Day. The Austrian Mauthausen Committee (MKÖ) has organised the Festival of Joy since 2013, in cooperation with the Austrian government and the City of Vienna. The festival is held annually on Heldenplatz.

On the eve of the 75th anniversary in 2020, Russian president Vladimir Putin, at the request of Chancellor Sebastian Kurz, gave a live address broadcast on Austrian TV channel ORF.

=== France ===
France celebrates VE Day on 8 May, known as 8 mai 1945, being a national and public holiday.

As of 3 September 2018, at least 523 street names "Rue (du) 8-Mai-1945" are recorded in the 18 regions, as well as in the 36,700 French communes (equivalent of civil parishes in England).

Orléans simultaneously celebrates both VE Day and the anniversary of the Siege of Orléans being lifted on this date by French forces led by Joan of Arc, patron saint of France, in 1429, during the Hundred Years War.

8 May 1945 was also the beginning of the Sétif and Guelma massacre in French Algeria, and it remains a point of contention in Algeria and France.

=== Germany ===
Events in Berlin occur on 8 May to commemorate those who fought against Nazism in the German Resistance and died in World War II. In 2020, a regional holiday in Berlin occurred on 8 May to mark the 75th anniversary of surrender. East Germany celebrated 8 May as its Tag der Befreiung (Liberation Day), first celebrated under Walter Ulbricht's government in 1950 and repeated annually until the fall of communism. Between 1975 and 1990, it was Tag des Sieges (Victory Day).

=== Poland ===
The 8th May is known in Poland as "Narodowy Dzień Zwycięstwa" (National Victory Day), and this has been the officially recognised date since a decision on 24 April 2015. From 1945 until 2014, Poland officially recognised 9 May, in line with Russia.

On 8 May 1945, a meeting of the Council of Ministers was held, debating whether to establish the holiday on 8 May (proposed by Marshal Michał Rola-Żymierski) or 10 May (proposed by the government). Finally, the "National Day of Victory and Freedom" was established on 9 May by decree.

From 1946 to 1989, it was celebrated with Russian traditions, as Poland was a socialist state at the time. The main celebrations were carried out at Plac Zwycięstwa (Victory Square) or Plac Defilad (Parade Square) in Warsaw (most notably in 1985).

After 1990 and the fall of the Soviet Union, no official ceremonies were organized; however, many cities and military units together with local governments organized their own festivities. The Russian minority in Poland continues to celebrate 9 May traditions to this date. At the end of March 2015, due to the upcoming 70th anniversary of the end of World War II in Europe, the president of the Institute of National Remembrance Łukasz Kamiński sent a letter to the Marshal of the Sejm requesting a change from 9 to 8 May. On 24 April, the Sejm adopted the Act on National Victory Day to be celebrated on 8 May, at the same time abolishing the National Day of Victory and Freedom celebrated on 9 May.

=== United Kingdom ===
In the United Kingdom, although a major national event, VE Day is not an annual public holiday. In 1995 and 2020, the early May bank holiday was moved by the government from the preceding Monday to 8 May to commemorate the 50th and 75th anniversaries of VE Day, respectively.

=== United States ===
Victory Day is not a federal holiday in the United States. However, on 5 May 2025, President Donald Trump issued a proclamation designating 8 May as "Victory Day for World War II".

=== Commemorative events ===
- Belgium: In Belgium, the commemoration of the termination of World War II since 1974 has been part of the Armistice of 11 November 1918 (Dutch: Wapenstilstandsdag), an annual national holiday. Every year on this day, a truce-ceremony is held in the presence of the king at the Tomb of the Unknown Soldier near the Congress Column in Brussels. It was first intended to commemorate the victims of the First World War and subsequently those of World War II and all other wars worldwide.
- Czech Republic: Since the Dissolution of Czechoslovakia in 1993, the Czech Republic has officially recognized 8 May as Victory Day (Den vítězství) Liberation Day (Den osvobození). In recent years the liberation of Plzeň by American forces has been commemorated on 5 May. From 1948 to 1993, the Czechoslovak Republic celebrated 9 May, which was marked with a military parade of the Czechoslovak People's Army (ČSLA) on Letná every five years.
- European Union: 9 May is Europe Day which celebrates "peace and unity in Europe", on the anniversary of the 1950 Schuman Declaration.
- Baltic states: Estonia, Latvia and Lithuania officially commemorate 8 May, but do not commemorate 9 May since it marked the Soviet occupation in 1944 for these states. Despite this, the local Russian communities still informally celebrate 9 May. Russian diplomats, other representatives from the Commonwealth of Independent States, and local politicians of Russian origin usually take part.

== List of associated holidays ==
Country	Holiday name	Date	Type	Notes
Armenia	Victory and Peace Day	9 May	National public	
Azerbaijan	Victory Day	9 May	National public	
Bailiwick of Guernsey	Liberation Day, Guernsey	9 May	Regional public	British Channel Islands have three Liberation Days: 9 May in Jersey and Guernsey; 10 May in Sark; and 16 May in Alderney
Bailiwick of Guernsey	Liberation Day, Sark	10 May	Regional public	
Bailiwick of Guernsey	Liberation Day, Alderney	16 May	Regional public	
Belarus	Victory Day	9 May	National public	
Bosnia and Herzegovina	Victory Day	9 May	Regional public	Public holiday only in Republika Srpska but celebrated across the nation
Croatia	Victory Day	9 May	National commemorative	
Czech Republic	Victory Day	8 May	National public	Known as Den vítězství. Public holiday.
Denmark	Liberation Day	5 May	National commemorative	as "Befrielsesdag" (Liberation Day), an official flag flying day, not a public holiday.
Estonia	Remembrance Day	8 May	National commemorative	Not a public holiday; commemorative services are held during the day.
Georgia	Victory over Fascism Day	9 May	National public	As "ფაშიზმზე გამარჯვების დღე" (Victory over Fascism Day)
Israel	VE Day	9 May	National commemorative	Considered a national day of remembrance.
Italy	Liberation Day	25 April	National public	Public holiday.
Jersey	Liberation Day	9 May	Regional public	
Kazakhstan	Victory Day	9 May	National public	
Kyrgyzstan	Victory Day	9 May	National public	
Latvia	Remembrance Day	8 May	National commemorative	As Nacisma sagrāves un Otrā pasaules kara upuru piemiņas diena (The Crushing of Nazism and Commemoration Day of Victims of World War II). Not a public holiday; commemorative services are held during the day.
Lithuania	Remembrance Day	8 May	National commemorative	As Antrojo pasaulinio karo aukų atminimo diena (Day of Remembrance of the Victims of the World War II). Not a public holiday; commemorative services are held by the President and other officials.
Moldova	Victory Day	9 May	National public	
Netherlands	Liberation Day	5 May	National commemorative	as "Bevrijdingsdag" (Liberation Day), a public holiday held once every year on 5 May.
Norway	Liberation Day	8 May	National commemorative	as "Frigjøringsdagen" (Liberation Day) and The National Veterans Day, an official flag flying day, not a public holiday.
Poland	National Victory Day	8 May	National commemorative	Not a public holiday; commemorative services are held during the day.
Russia	Victory Day	9 May	National public	as "День Победы" (Victory Day)
Serbia	Victory Day	9 May	National public	as "Дан победе" / "Dan pobede" (Victory Day), a public working holiday.
Slovakia	Victory over Fascism Day	8 May	National public	as "Deň víťazstva nad fašizmom"
Tajikistan	Victory Day	9 May	National public	
Turkmenistan	Day of Remembrance of National Heroes of Turkmenistan in the 1941–1945 World War	9 May	National public	
Ukraine	Day of Remembrance and Victory over Nazism in World War II 1939 – 1945	8 May	National public	
Uzbekistan	Day of Remembrance and Honour	9 May	National public	Known as Xotira va qadrlash kuni; before 1999, it was known as Gʻalaba kuni (Victory Day).

=== Soviet Victory Day ===
The instrument of surrender signed 7 May 1945 stipulated that all hostilities must cease at 23:01 (CET), 8 May 1945. Since that point in time would be on 9 May in local time in the Soviet Union, most Soviet states including Russia celebrated Victory Day on 9 May.

== Gallery ==
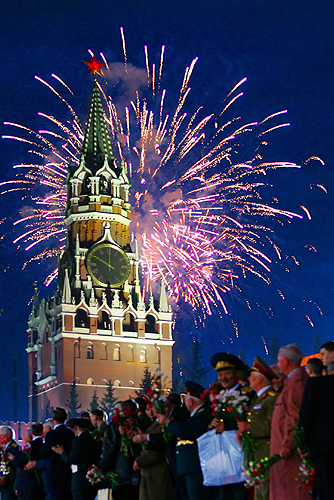
Fireworks in Moscow, Russia (Victory Day 2005)

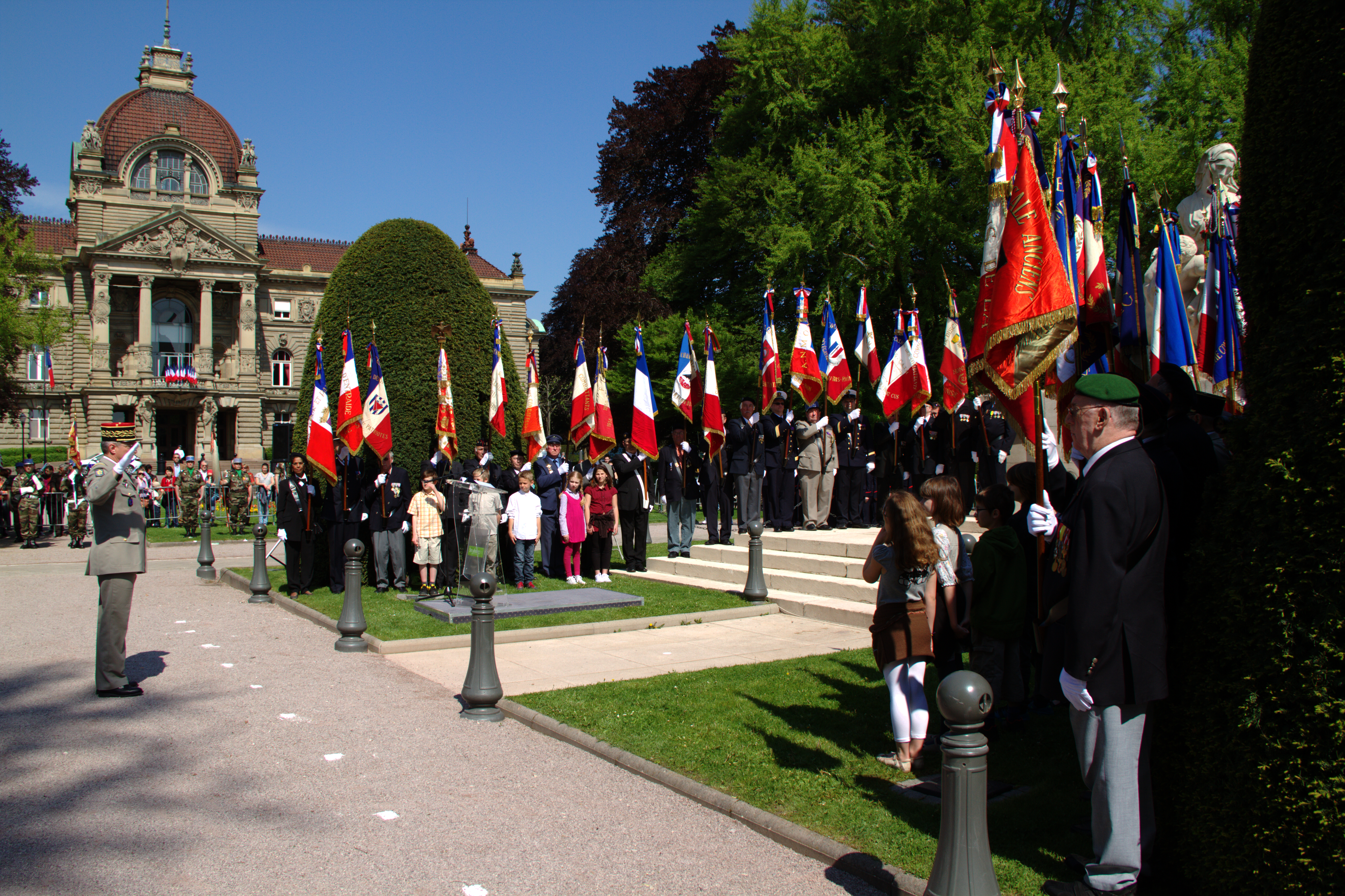
Ceremony in Place de la République, Strasbourg, France (2013)

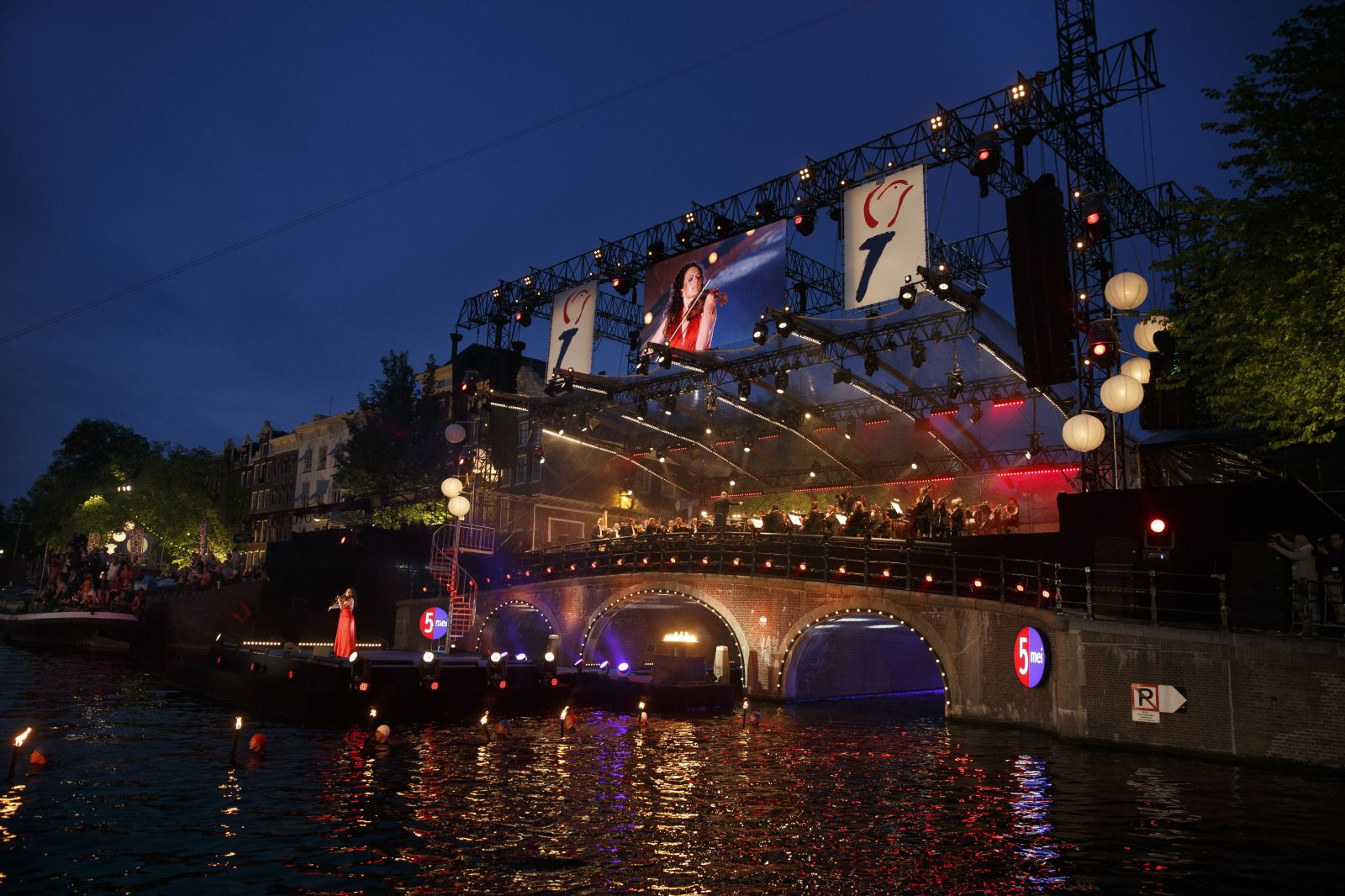
Concert in Amsterdam, Netherlands (Bevrijdingsdag 2014)

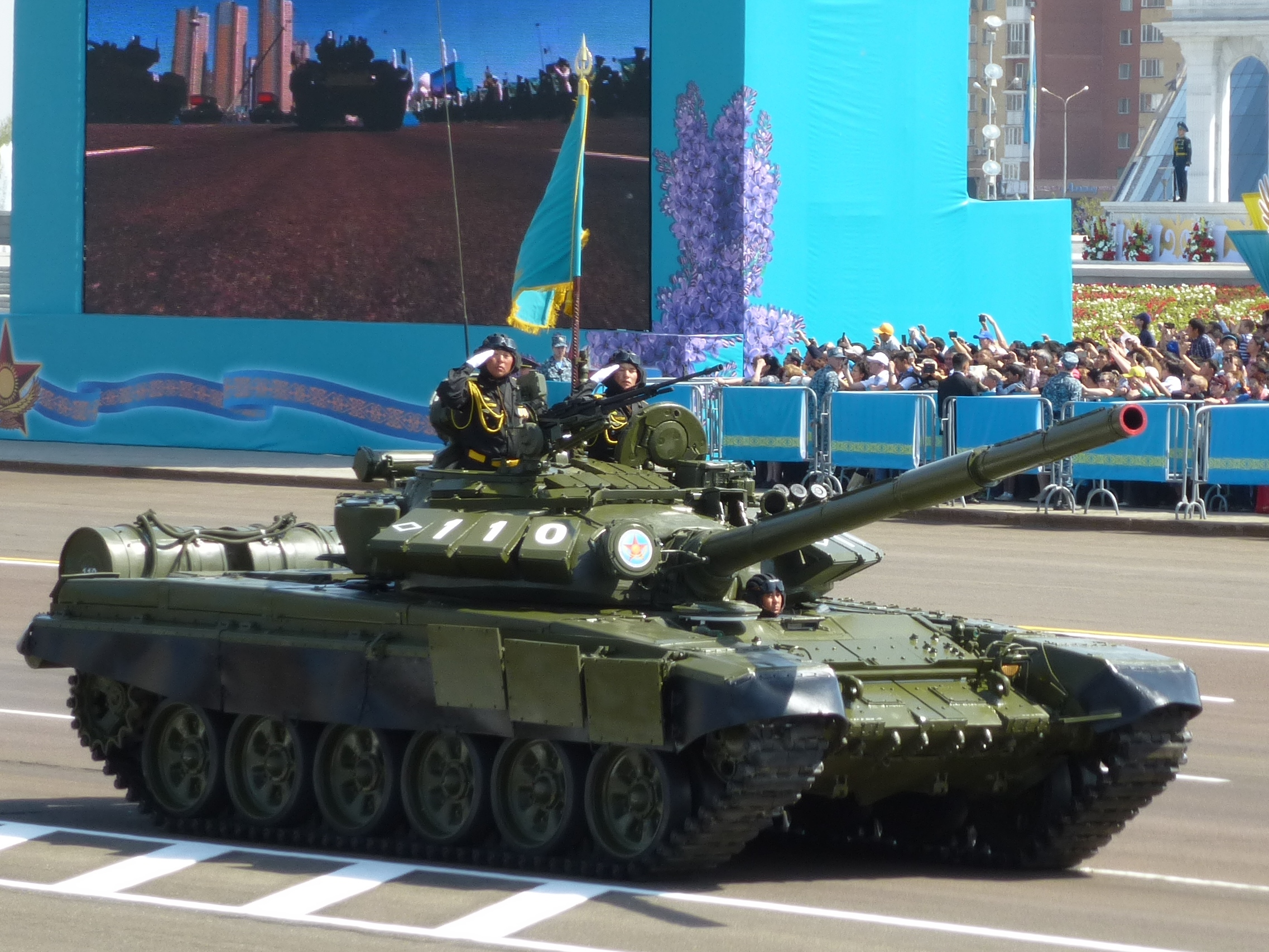
A T-72 tank in the Victory Day parade, Astana, Kazakhstan (Victory Day 2015)

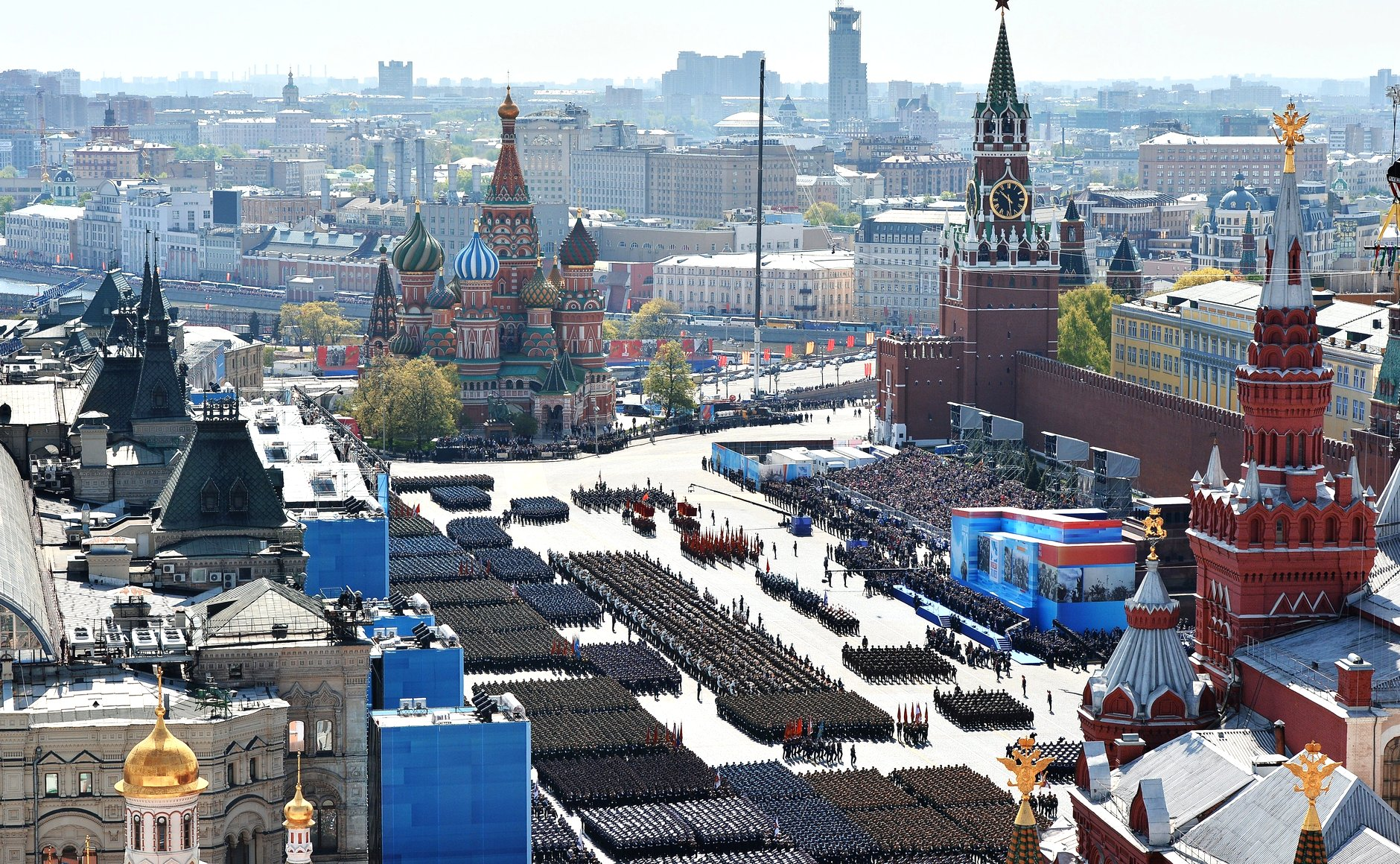
The Victory Day Parade, Red Square, Moscow, Russia (Victory Day 2015)

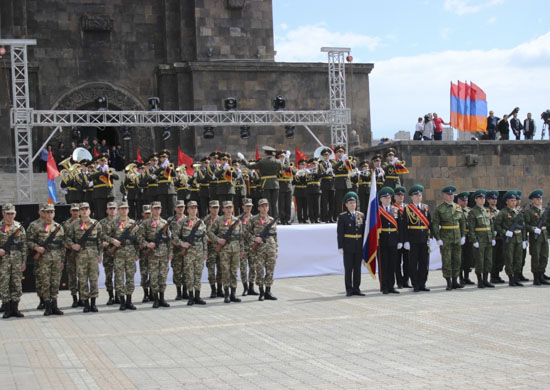
Ceremony at the Mother Armenia monument, Yerevan, Armenia (Victory Day 2018)

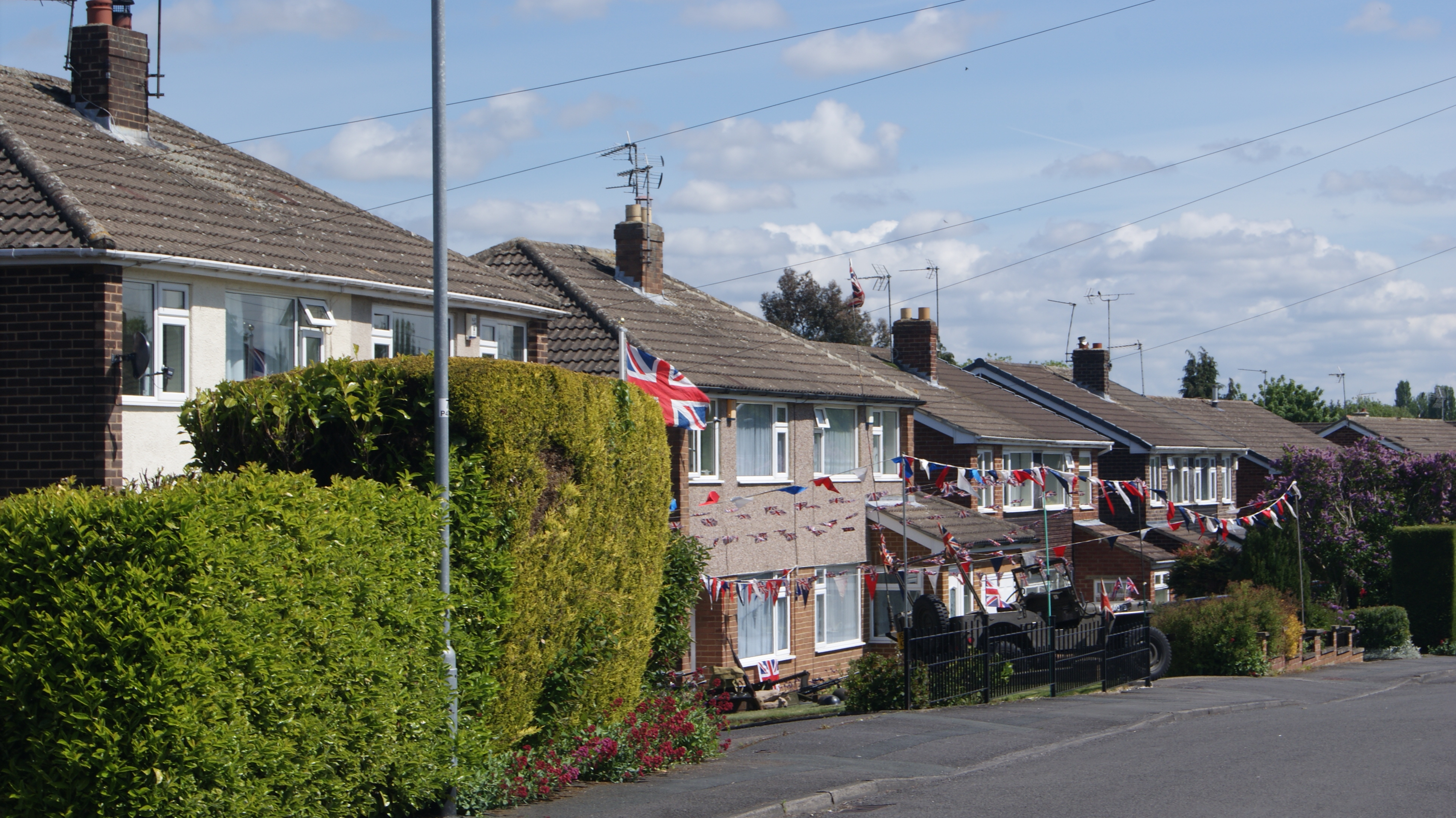
A street in Wetherby with decorative bunting, United Kingdom (2020)

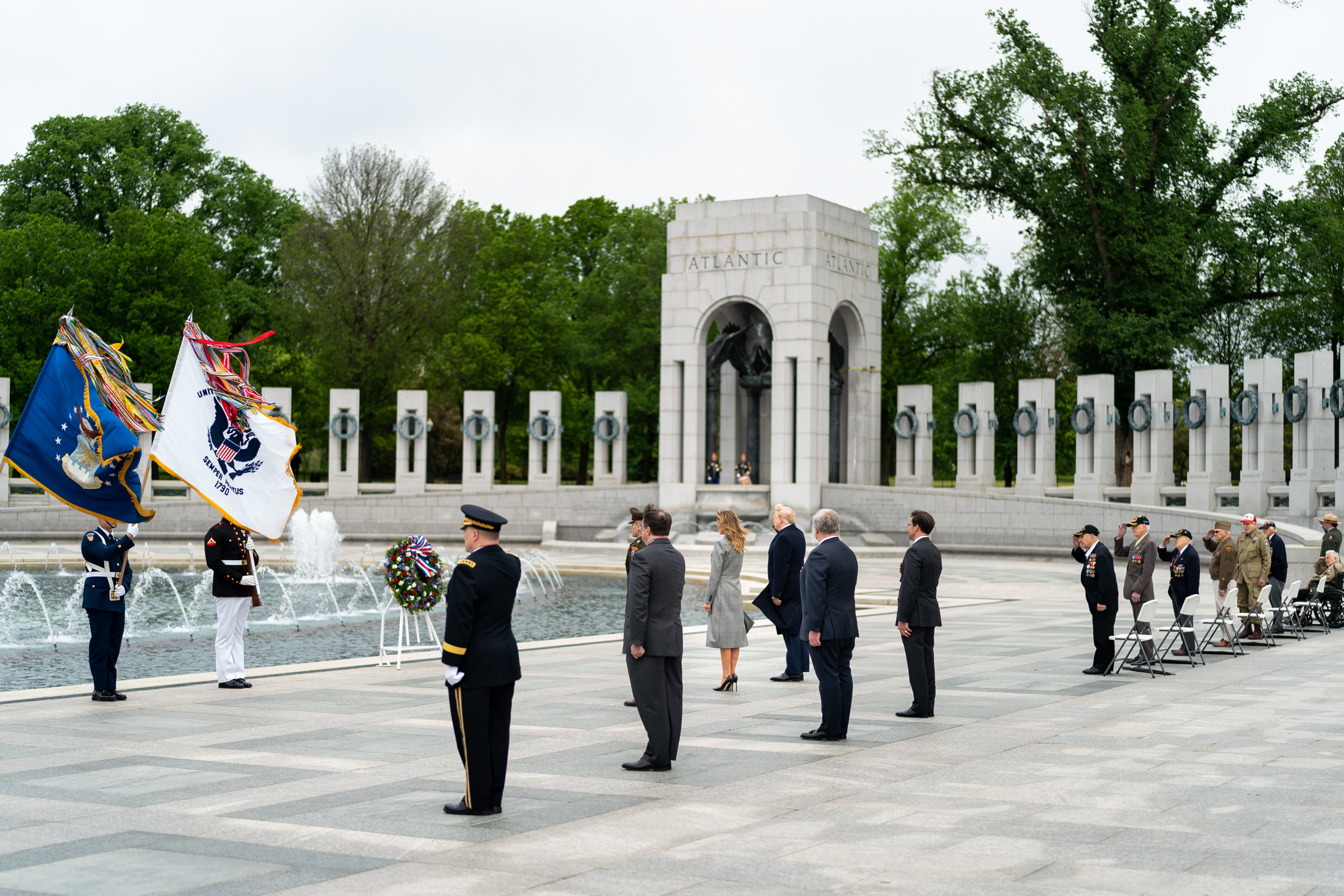
Ceremony at the World War II Memorial, Washington D.C., United States (2020)

== See also ==
- List of timelines of World War II
- Time of Remembrance and Reconciliation for Those Who Lost Their Lives during the Second World War
- Victory Day
- Victory Day Parades
- Victory over Japan Day
- Zero hour (1945)

== Bibliography ==
- Hermiston, Roger (2016). All Behind You, Winston — Churchill's Great Coalition, 1940–45. London: Aurum Press. ISBN 978-17-81316-64-1.
- Telfer, Kevin (2015). The Summer of '45. Islington: Aurum Press Ltd. ISBN 978-17-81314-35-7.
