= 2024 deaths in the United States (October–December) =

- Decades: 2000s; 2010s; 2020s; 2030s
- See also: History of the United States (2016–present); Timeline of United States history (2010–present); List of years in the United States

The following notable deaths in the United States occurred in October–December 2024. Names are reported under the date of death, in alphabetical order as set out in WP:NAMESORT. A typical entry reports information in the following sequence: Name, age, country of citizenship at birth and subsequent nationality (if applicable), what subject was noted for, year of birth (if known), and reference.

== October ==
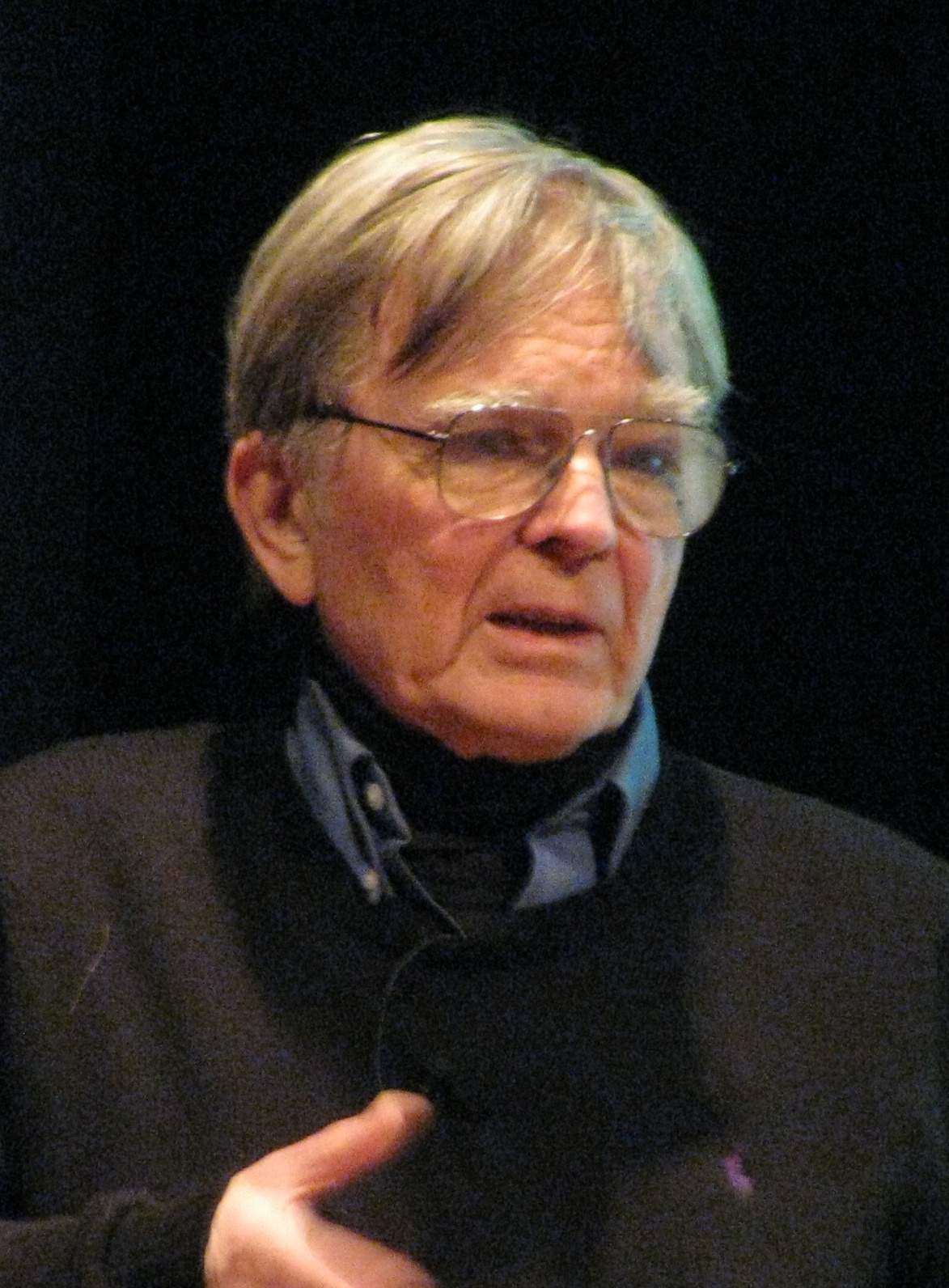
Robert Coover

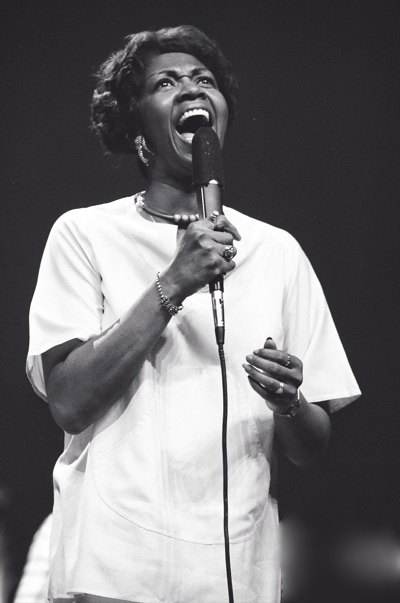
Cissy Houston

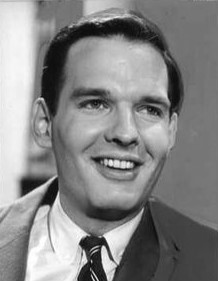
Nicholas Pryor

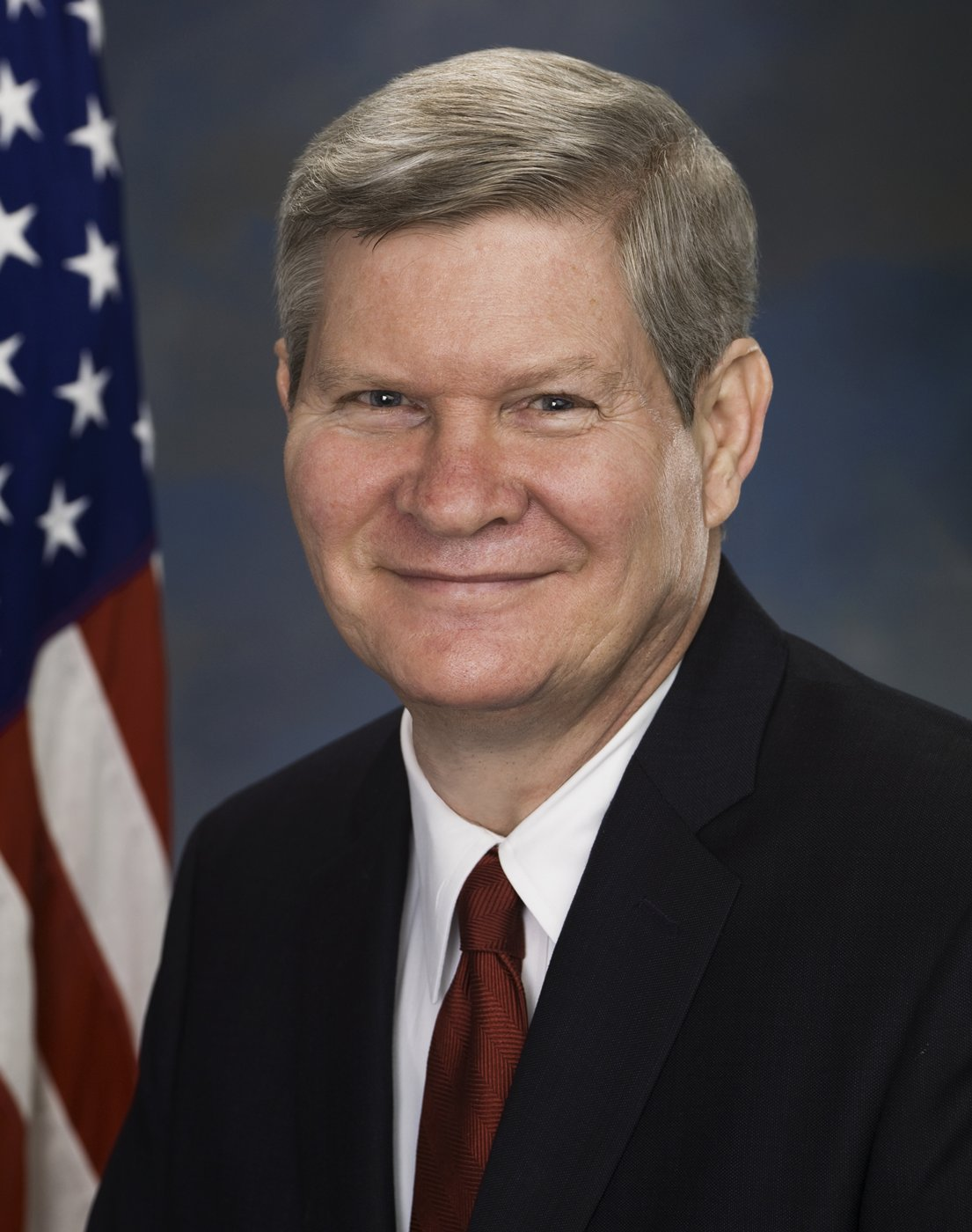
Tim Johnson

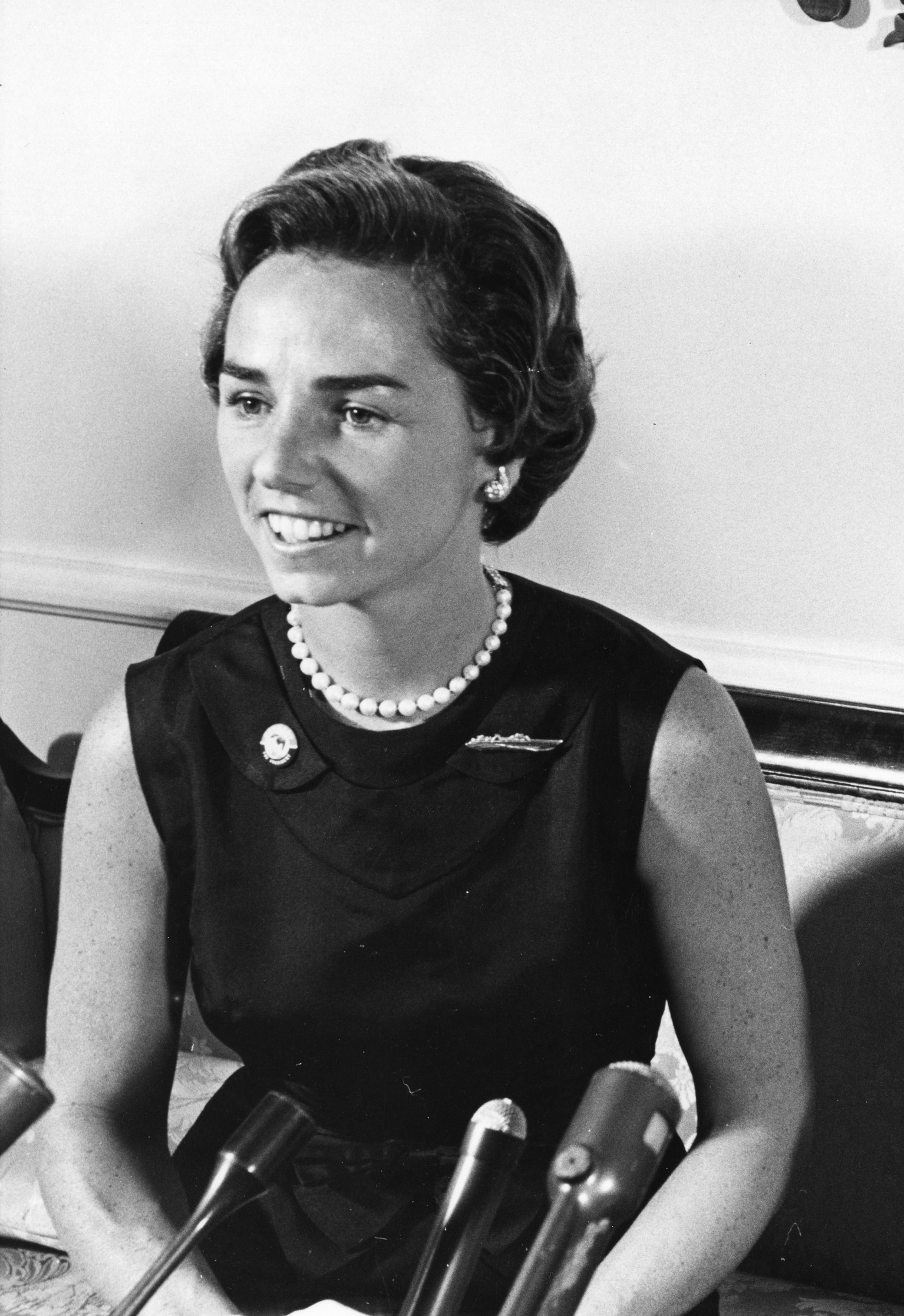
Ethel Kennedy

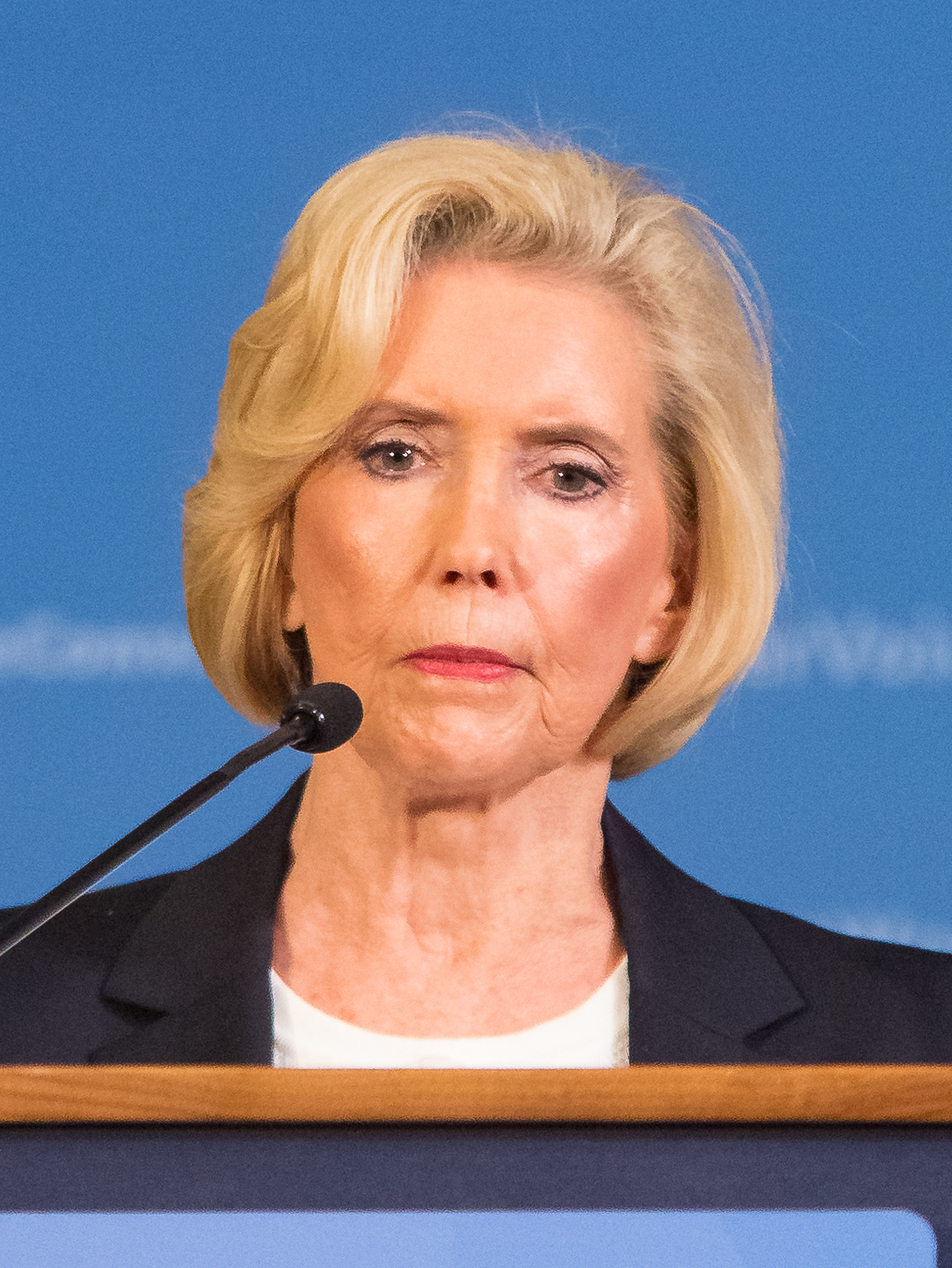
Lilly Ledbetter

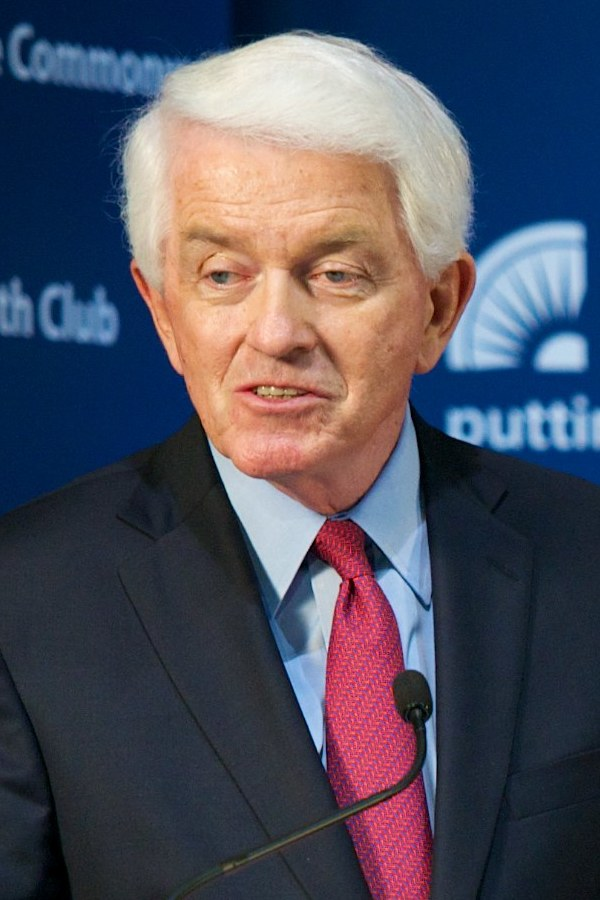
Thomas J. Donohue

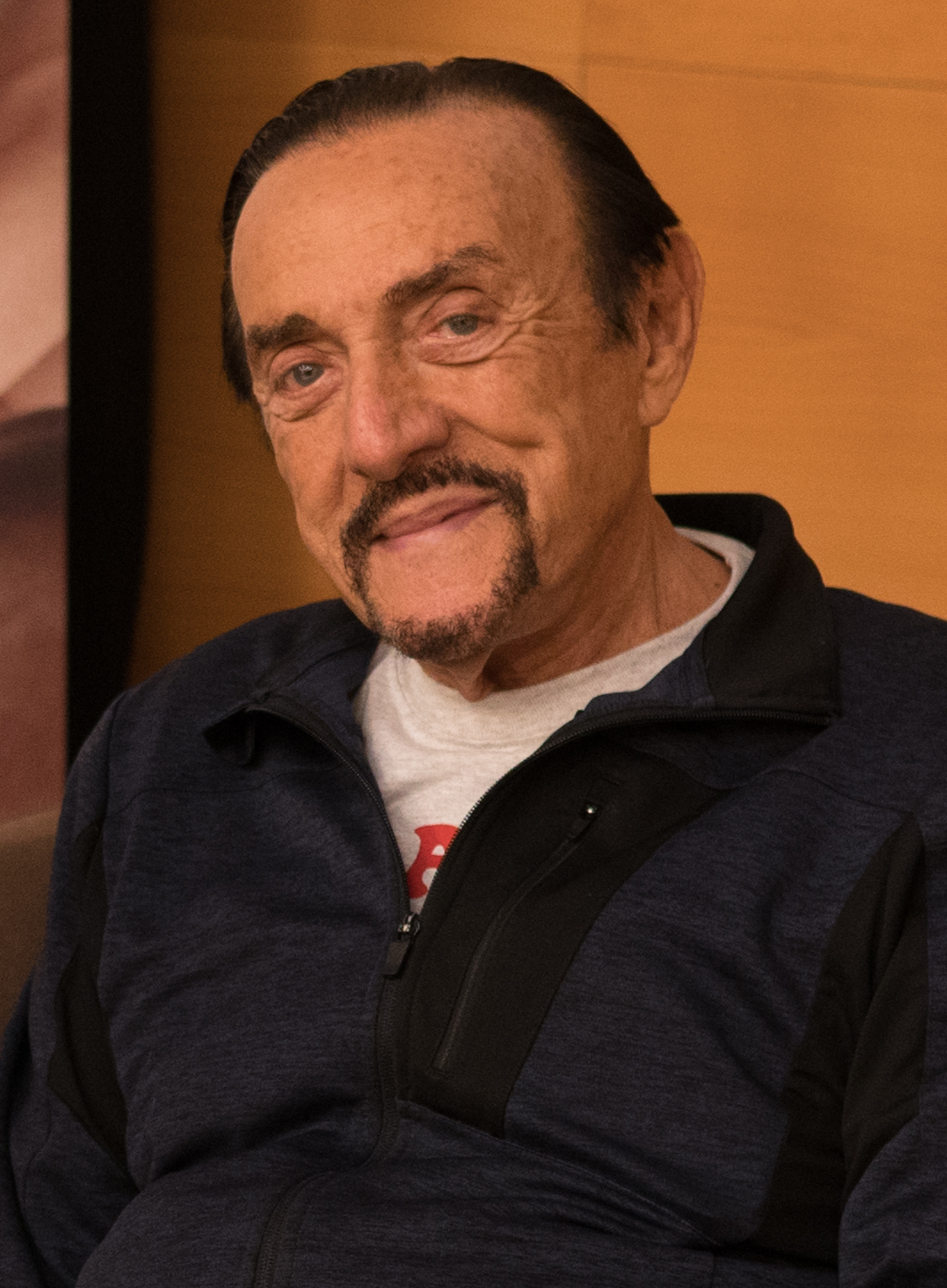
Philip Zimbardo

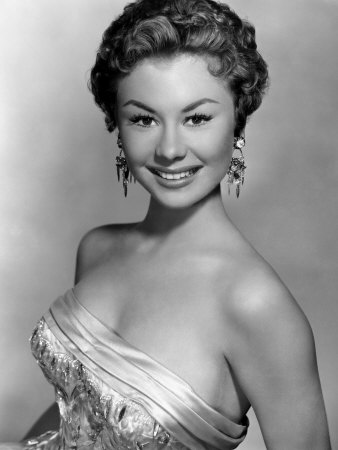
Mitzi Gaynor

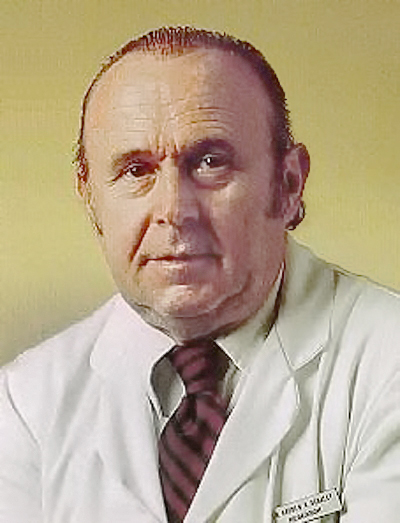
Andrew Schally

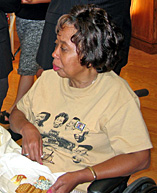
Thelma Mothershed-Wair

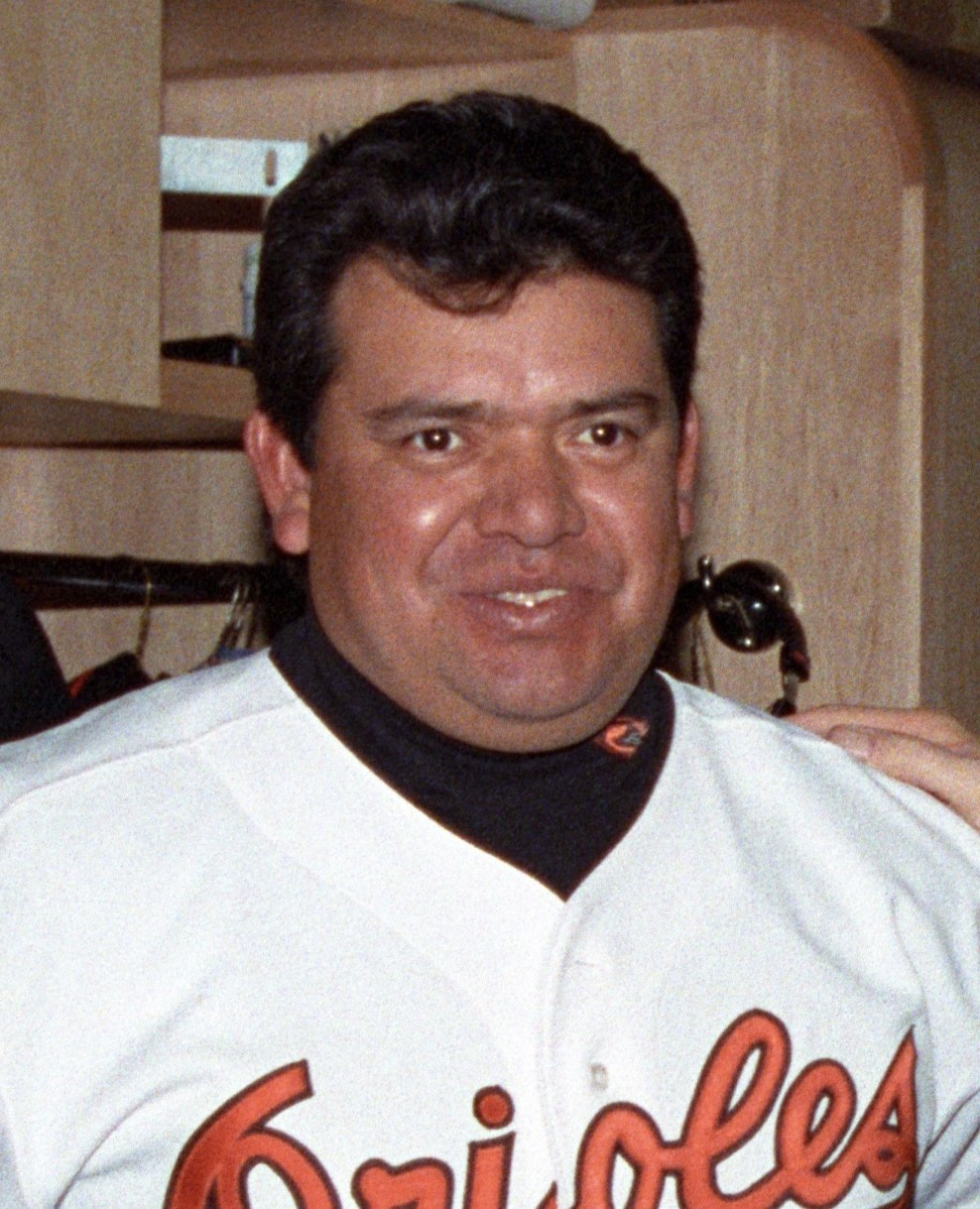
Fernando Valenzuela

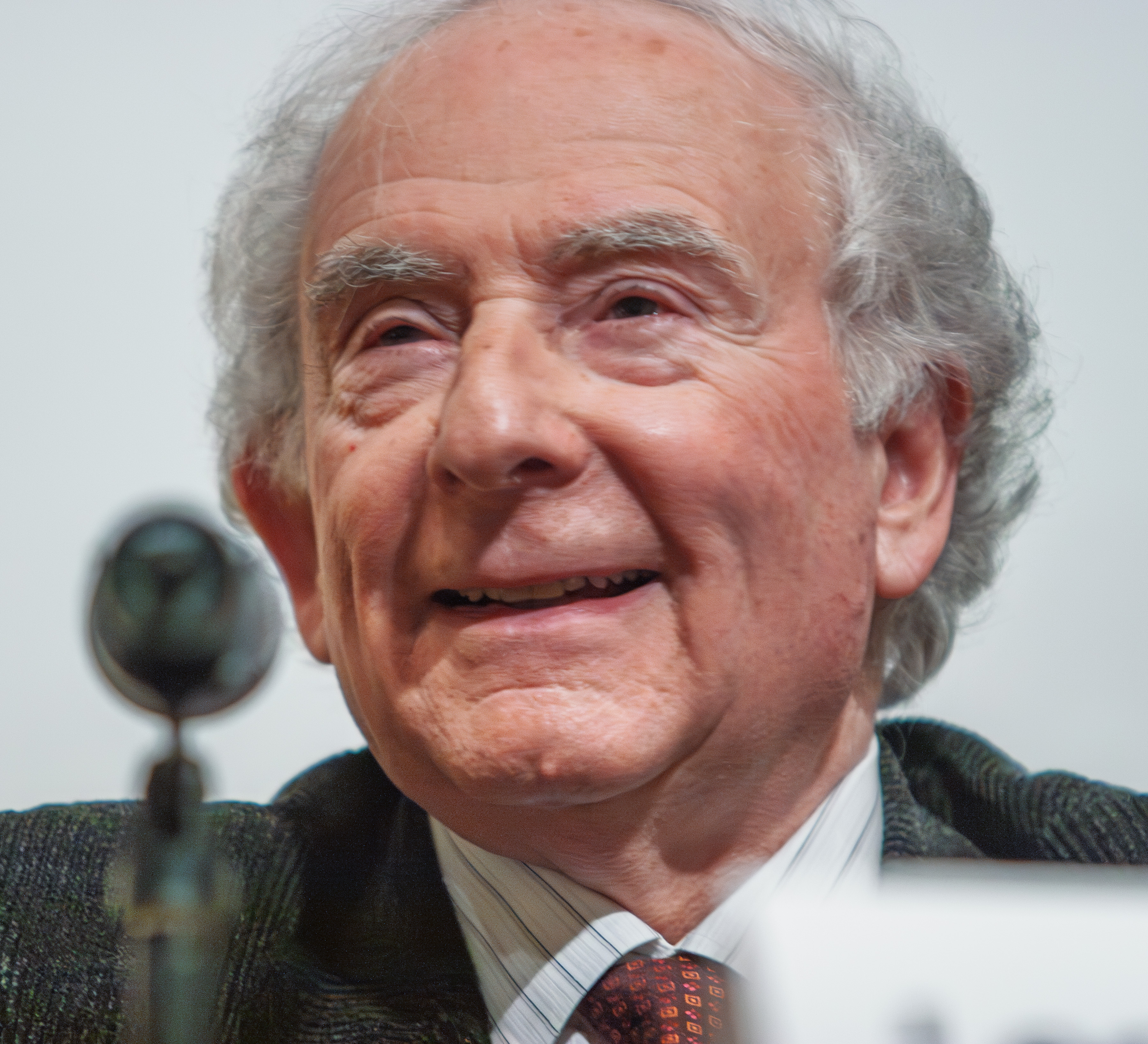
Leon Cooper

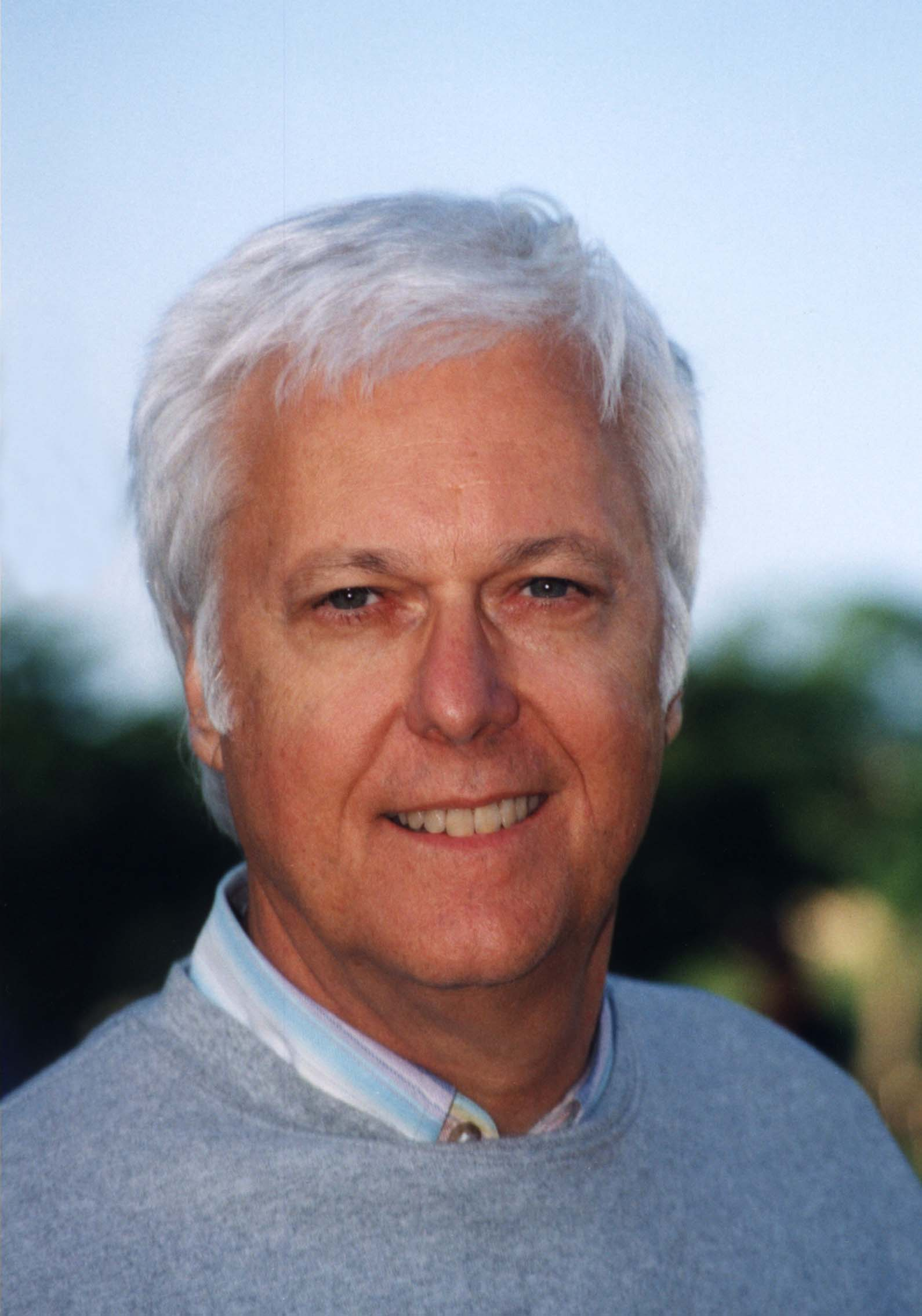
Jack Jones

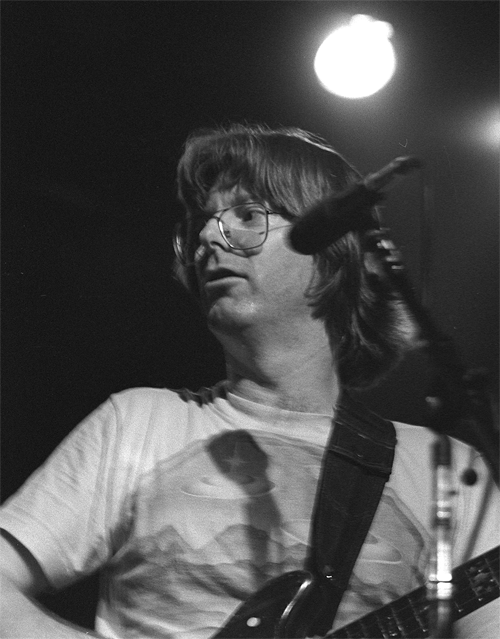
Phil Lesh

Paul Morrissey

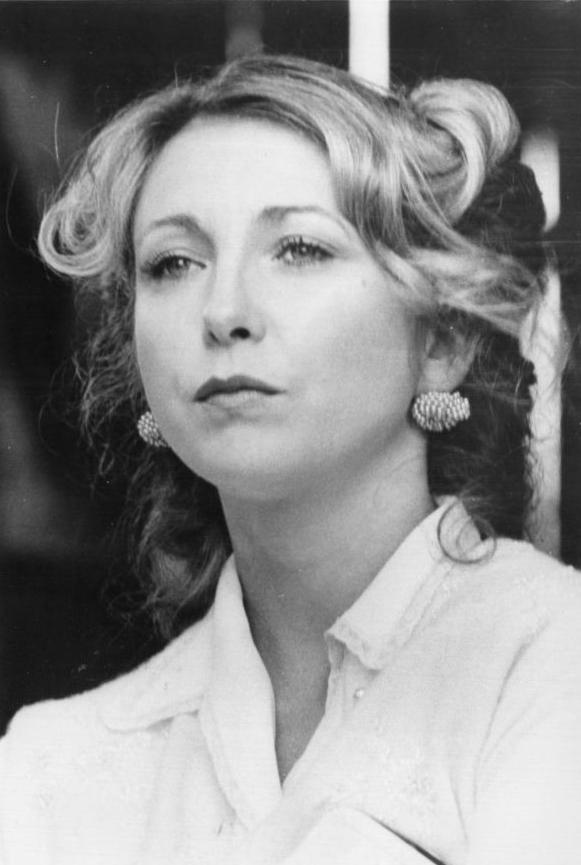
Teri Garr

- October 1
  - David Burnham, 91, journalist (The New York Times) (b. 1933)
  - Garcia Glen White, 61, serial killer (b. 1963)
  - Bob Yerkes, 92, stuntman (Back to the Future, Return of the Jedi, Hook) (b. 1932) (death announced on this date)
- October 2
  - Christopher Charles Benninger, 81, American-born Indian architect (b. 1942)
  - Susie Berning, 83, Hall of Fame golfer (b. 1941)
  - Matthew Lewis, 94, photojournalist (The Washington Post), Pulitzer Prize winner (1975) (b. 1930)
  - Roger K. Lewis, 83, architect and urban planner (b. 1941)
- October 3
  - John Gierach, 78, author (b. 1946)
  - Jerry Miller, singer (The Untouchables)
  - Bob Speake, 94, baseball player (Chicago Cubs, San Francisco Giants) (b. 1930)
- October 4
  - Leah Rawls Atkins, 89, historian (b. 1935)
  - Allan Blye, 87, Canadian-born television writer (The Smothers Brothers Comedy Hour, The Sonny & Cher Comedy Hour) and actor (Mister Rogers' Neighborhood) (b. 1937)
  - Christopher Ciccone, 63, artist, interior decorator and designer (b. 1960)
  - Greg Landry, 77, football player (Detroit Lions, Baltimore Colts) and coach (Chicago Bears) (b. 1946)
  - John Lasell, 95, actor (Dark Shadows, The Twilight Zone, Perry Mason) (b. 1928)
  - Billy Shaw, 85, Hall of Fame football player (Buffalo Bills) (b. 1938)
- October 5
  - Robert Coover, 92, novelist and short story writer (b. 1932)
  - Jack Iker, 75, Anglican clergyman, bishop of Fort Worth (1995–2009) (b. 1949)
  - Beverly Turner Lynds, 95, astronomer (b. 1929)
  - Werner Merzbacher, 96, Swiss-born businessman (b. 1928)
  - Tefko Saracevic, 93, Croatian-born information scientist (b. 1930)
  - Tepin, 12, Hall of Fame racehorse (b. 2011) (death announced on this date)
- October 6
  - Alan N. Bloch, 92, jurist, judge of the U.S. District Court for Western Pennsylvania (since 1979) (b. 1932)
  - Dominic Cossa, 89, operatic baritone (b. 1935)
  - Dan Coughlin, 85–86, sportscaster (WJW) (b. 1938)
  - Neil Grabois, 88, mathematician (b. 1935)
  - Dave Hobson, 87, politician, member of the Ohio Senate (1982–1991) and the U.S. House of Representatives (1991–2009) (b. 1936)
  - Johnny Neel, 70, musician (The Allman Brothers Band) (b. 1954)
- October 7
  - Cissy Houston, 91, singer (The Sweet Inspirations) and actress (The Preacher's Wife), Grammy winner (1997, 1999) (b. 1933)
  - Arie L. Kopelman, 86, businessman and philanthropist, president of Chanel (1986–2004) (b. 1938)
  - Jack Ponti, 66, songwriter ("Hey Stoopid", "Love's a Loaded Gun") and record producer (b. 1958)
  - Nicholas Pryor, 89, actor (Beverly Hills, 90210, Port Charles, Risky Business) (b. 1935)
  - Lore Segal, 96, Austrian-born novelist (b. 1928)
  - John Arthur Smith, 82, politician, member of the New Mexico Senate (1989–2020) (b. 1942)
- October 8
  - Pat Fischer, 84, football player (St. Louis Cardinals, Washington Redskins) (b. 1940)
  - Richard F. Grein, 91, American Episcopal clergyman, bishop of New York (1989−2001) (b. 1932)
  - R. Phillip Haire, 88, politician, member of the North Carolina House of Representatives (1999–2013) (b. 1936)
  - Tim Johnson, 77, politician, member of the U.S. Senate (1997–2015) (b. 1946)
  - Maxine Mimms, 96, educator (Evergreen State College) (b. 1928)
  - Abdul Salaam, 71, football player (New York Jets) (b. 1953)
  - Edward Vaughn, 90, politician, member of the Michigan House of Representatives (1979–1980, 1995–2000) (b. 1934) (death announced on this date)
- October 9
  - Jerry Covington, 69, custom motorcycle builder (b. 1955)
  - Steve Hodges, 75, politician, member of the Missouri House of Representatives (2007–2014) (b. 1949)
  - Ralph Okerlund, 72, politician, member of the Utah Senate (2009–2020) (b. 1952)
  - Augie Pabst, 90, racing driver, USAC champion (1959) (b. 1933)
  - Gaylen Pitts, 78, baseball player (Oakland Athletics) (b. 1946)
  - Clark R. Rasmussen, 90, politician, member of the Iowa House of Representatives (1965–1967) (b. 1934)
- October 10
  - Adam Abeshouse, 63, recording engineer, music producer and classical violinist (b. 1961)
  - Tony Guzzo, 75, baseball coach (Old Dominion Monarchs) (b. 1949)
  - Dona Irwin, 92, politician, member of the New Mexico House of Representatives (1999–2017) (b. 1932)
  - J. J. Jeffrey, 84, radio executive and disc jockey (b. 1940)
  - Ethel Kennedy, 96, human rights advocate (b. 1928)
  - James T. Vaughn Jr., 75, lawyer and judge, associate justice of the Delaware Supreme Court (2014–2023) (b. 1949)
- October 11
  - Roger Browne, 94, actor (Venus Against the Son of Hercules, Super Seven Calling Cairo, The Spy Who Loved Flowers) (b. 1930)
  - Ward Christensen, 78, computer scientist (CBBS) (b. 1945)
  - George Little, 82, politician (b. 1942)
  - Dottie Leonard Miller, 79, music publishing and label executive (b. 1945)
- October 12
  - Tylee Craft, 23, football player (North Carolina Tar Heels) (b. 2001)
  - Ka, 52, rapper (b. 1972)
  - Lilly Ledbetter, 86, activist (Lilly Ledbetter Fair Pay Act of 2009) (b. 1938)
  - Chip Mellor, 73, lawyer, co-founder of the Institute for Justice (b. 1950)
  - Lillian Schwartz, 97, visual artist (b. 1927)
- October 13
  - Donald J. Hall Sr., 96, greeting card executive, CEO of Hallmark Cards (1966–1986) (b. 1928)
  - Curt Moody, 73, architect, co-founder of Moody Nolan (b. 1950/1951)
  - Libby Titus, 77, singer and songwriter (b. 1947)
- October 14
  - Thomas J. Donohue, 86, business executive, president and CEO of the U.S. Chamber of Commerce (1997–2021) (b. 1938)
  - Morris Mills, 97, politician, member of the Indiana Senate (1972–2000) and House of Representatives (1968–1972) (b. 1927)
  - Barbara Owen, 91, organist and scholar (b. 1933)
  - Philip Zimbardo, 91, psychologist (Stanford prison experiment, Heroic Imagination Project) and writer (The Lucifer Effect) (b. 1933)
- October 15
  - Verna L. Clayton, 87, politician, member of the Illinois House of Representatives (1992–1998) (b. 1937)
  - Bud Daley, 92, baseball player (Cleveland Indians, Kansas City Athletics, New York Yankees) (b. 1932)
  - E. Allen Emerson, 70, computer scientist (b. 1954)
  - Arthur Maughan, 83, wrestler and coach (b. 1940/1941)
  - Richard Secord, 92, air force major general (b. 1932)
- October 16
  - Sherry Coben, 71, television writer and producer (Kate & Allie, Ryan's Hope, Bailey Kipper's P.O.V.) (b. 1953)
  - Alicia Henry, 58, contemporary artist (b. 1966)
  - Evelyn Hurley, 109, nun and educator (b. 1915)
  - Inger Lorre, 61, musician (Nymphs) and songwriter ("Yard of Blonde Girls") (b. 1963)
  - Alan Mansfield, 72, American-New Zealand musician (Dragon), record producer ("Rain") and songwriter ("Young Years") (b. 1952)
  - Patti McGee, 79, skateboarder (b. 1945)
  - Tina Kaidanow, 59, diplomat and government official, ambassador to Kosovo (2008–2009) and coordinator for counterterrorism (2014–2016) (b. 1965) (death announced on this date)
  - Ron Smith, 77, bridge player (b. 1947)
- October 17
  - Nicholas Daniloff, 89, journalist (U.S. News & World Report) (b. 1934)
  - Mitzi Gaynor, 93, actress (There's No Business Like Show Business, The Birds and the Bees, South Pacific), singer and dancer (b. 1931)
  - Bobby Gill, 65, racing driver (NASCAR) (b. 1959)
  - Patricia Johanson, 84, artist and environmentalist (b. 1940)
  - Aaron Kaufman, 51, film director (Superpower) and producer (Machete Kills, Sin City: A Dame to Kill For) (b. 1973)
  - Dale F. Nitzschke, 87, academic, president of Marshall University (1984–1990), UNH (1990–1994) and SEMO (1996–1999) (b. 1937)
  - Rick Nolan, 80, businessman and politician, member of the House of Representatives (1975–1981, 2013–2019) (b. 1943) (death announced on this date)
  - Andrew Schally, 97, Polish-born endocrinologist, Nobel laureate (1977) (b. 1927)
- October 18
  - George A. Bekey, 96, roboticist (b. 1928) (death announced on this date)
  - Sheldon J. Krys, 90, diplomat, ambassador to Trinidad and Tobago (1985–1988) (b. 1934)
- October 19
  - Tommy Head, 79, politician, member of the Tennessee House of Representatives (1986–2004) (b. 1945)
  - John Kinsel Sr., 107, World War II veteran (Navajo Code Talkers) (b. 1917)
  - Thelma Mothershed-Wair, 83, counselor, member of the Little Rock Nine (b. 1940)
  - Mel Showers, 78, news anchor (WKRG-TV) (b. 1946)
- October 20
  - Chuck Coleman, aviator and aerospace engineer.
  - Barbara Dane, 97, musician and activist, co-founder of Paredon Records (b. 1927)
  - Hualing Nieh Engle, 99, Chinese-born author and academic (b. 1925)
  - Andy Ireland, 94, politician, member of the U.S. House of Representatives (1977–1993) (b. 1930)
  - Walter Jacob, 94, rabbi (b. 1930)
  - Ernest Mario, 86, pharmaceutical executive (b. 1938)
  - Michael Newman, 67, lifeguard and actor (Baywatch) (b. 1957)
- October 21
  - John Campbell, 86, football player (Minnesota Vikings, Pittsburgh Steelers, Baltimore Colts) (b. 1938)
  - Marie Goodman Hunter, 95, actress and singer (b. 1929)
  - Barbara Kolb, 85, composer (b. 1939)
  - Paul V. Marshall, 77, author and Episcopal prelate, bishop of Bethlehem (1996–2013) (b. 1947)
- October 22
  - Charles Brandt, 82, investigator, writer (I Heard You Paint Houses), and speaker (b. 1942)
  - Richard A. Cash, 83, global health researcher, public health physician and internist (b. 1941)
  - Claire Daly, 66, baritone saxophonist and composer (b. 1958)
  - Elizabeth Francis, 115, supercentenarian, oldest person in the United States (since 2024) (b. 1909)
  - Janice Fisher, 85, politician, member of the Utah House of Representatives (2005–2014) (b. 1938)
  - Susan Williams Gifford, 64, politician, member of the Massachusetts House of Representatives (since 2003) (b. 1959)
  - Edd Griles, 78, music video director (b. 1945)
  - Grizzly 399, 28, grizzly bear (b. 1996)
  - Julia Hawkins, 108, Masters athlete (b. 1916)
  - Lynda Obst, 74, film producer (Sleepless in Seattle, The Fisher King, Interstellar) and author (b. 1950)
  - Alan Sacks, 81, television writer and producer (Chico and the Man, Welcome Back, Kotter) (b. 1943)
  - Johnnie Turner, 76, politician, member of the Kentucky House of Representatives (1999–2003) and the Senate (since 2021) (b. 1947)
  - Fernando Valenzuela, 63, Mexican-born baseball player (Los Angeles Dodgers), owner (Tigres de Quintana Roo) and broadcaster, World Series champion (1981) (b. 1960)
- October 23
  - Tim Clifford, 65, football player (Indiana Hoosiers) (b. 1958)
  - Leon Cooper, 94, physicist, Nobel laureate (1972) (b. 1930)
  - Gary Indiana, 74, novelist, playwright and art critic (The Village Voice) (b. 1950)
  - Jack Jones, 86, singer ("Wives and Lovers", "Love Boat") and actor (Over the Garden Wall) (b. 1938)
  - Rudy May, 80, baseball player (Montreal Expos, New York Yankees, California Angels) (b. 1944)
  - Robert C. Morgan, 81, art critic and historian (b. 1943)
- October 24
  - Amir Abdur-Rahim, 43, basketball player (Southeastern Louisiana) and coach (Kennesaw State, South Florida) (b. 1981)
  - Tom Jarriel, 89, journalist and television correspondent (20/20, ABC World News Tonight) (b. 1934) (death announced on this date)
  - Clark Kent, 57, Panamanian–born DJ, hip hop record producer and music executive (b. 1966)
  - Paul R. Mendes-Flohr, 83, American-Israeli Jewish scholar (b. 1941)
  - Roy W. Menninger, 97, psychiatrist, president of the Menninger Foundation (1967–1993) (b. 1926)
  - Jan Shrem, 94, book distributor and publisher (b. 1930) (death announced on this date)
  - Jeri Taylor, 86, television writer and producer (Star Trek: The Next Generation, Star Trek: Voyager, Quincy, M.E.) (b. 1938)
- October 25
  - Jo Ann Davidson, 97, politician, member of the Ohio House of Representatives (1981–2000) and speaker (1995–2000) (b. 1927)
  - Jim Donovan, 68, sportscaster (WKYC, Cleveland Browns Radio Network) (b. 1956)
  - David Harris, 75, actor (The Warriors, Brubaker, A Soldier's Story) (b. 1949)
  - Phil Lesh, 84, Hall of Fame musician (Grateful Dead) and songwriter ("Box of Rain", "Truckin'") (b. 1940)
  - Ron Perry, 92, athlete, coach and athletics administrator (b. 1932)
- October 26
  - Walter Ballard, 91, racing driver (b. 1933)
  - William Beavers, 89, politician, member of the Chicago City Council (1983–2006) and Cook County commissioner (2006–2013) (b. 1935)
  - Jim Donovan, 68, sportscaster (Cleveland Browns Radio Network) and news anchor (WKYC) (b. 1955)
  - Henry Fields, 86, basketball player (PUC, Stade Français, Olympique Antibes) (b. 1938)
  - Frank Ruff, 75, politician, member of the Virginia House of Delegates (1994–2000) and Senate (2000–2024) (b. 1949)
  - Holden Trent, 25, soccer player (Philadelphia Union) (b. 1999)
- October 27
  - John F. Keenan, 94, judge, judge of the United States District Court for the Southern District of New York (since 1983) (b. 1929)
- October 28
  - Alonzo Butler, 44, boxer (b. 1979)
  - James Ledbetter, 60, author, journalist and editor (b. 1963/1964)
  - Paul Morrissey, 86, film director (Flesh, Trash, Flesh for Frankenstein) (b. 1938)
  - Jerrod Mustaf, 55, basketball player (New York Knicks, Phoenix Suns) (b. 1969)
  - Lonnie Warwick, 82, football player (Minnesota Vikings, Atlanta Falcons, San Antonio Wings) (b. 1942)
- October 29
  - Teri Garr, 79, actress (Young Frankenstein, Tootsie, Mr. Mom) (b. 1944)
  - Jennifer Soldati, 77, politician, member of the New Hampshire House of Representatives (1989–1994).
- October 30
  - Wally Kennedy, 76, television and radio announcer (WPVI-TV) (b. 1948)
- October 31
  - Mike Haffner, 82, football player (Denver Broncos, Cincinnati Bengals) (b. 1942)
  - Greg Hildebrandt, 85, illustrator and artist (b. 1939)

== November ==
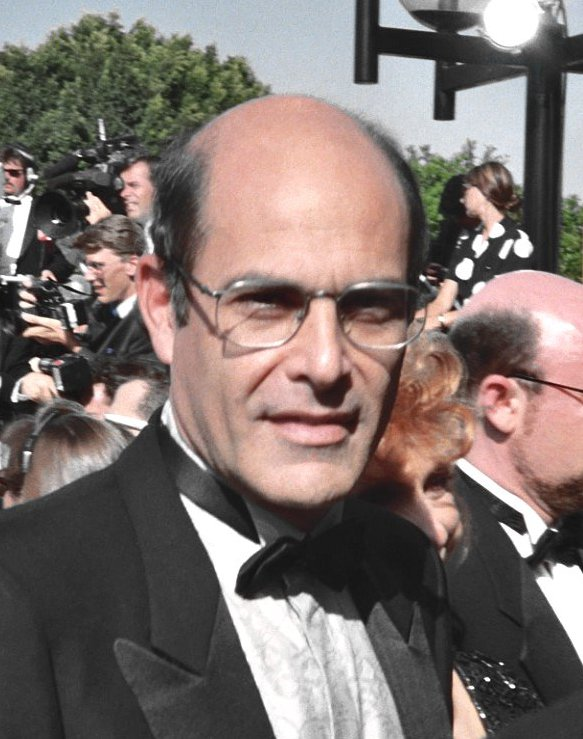
Alan Rachins

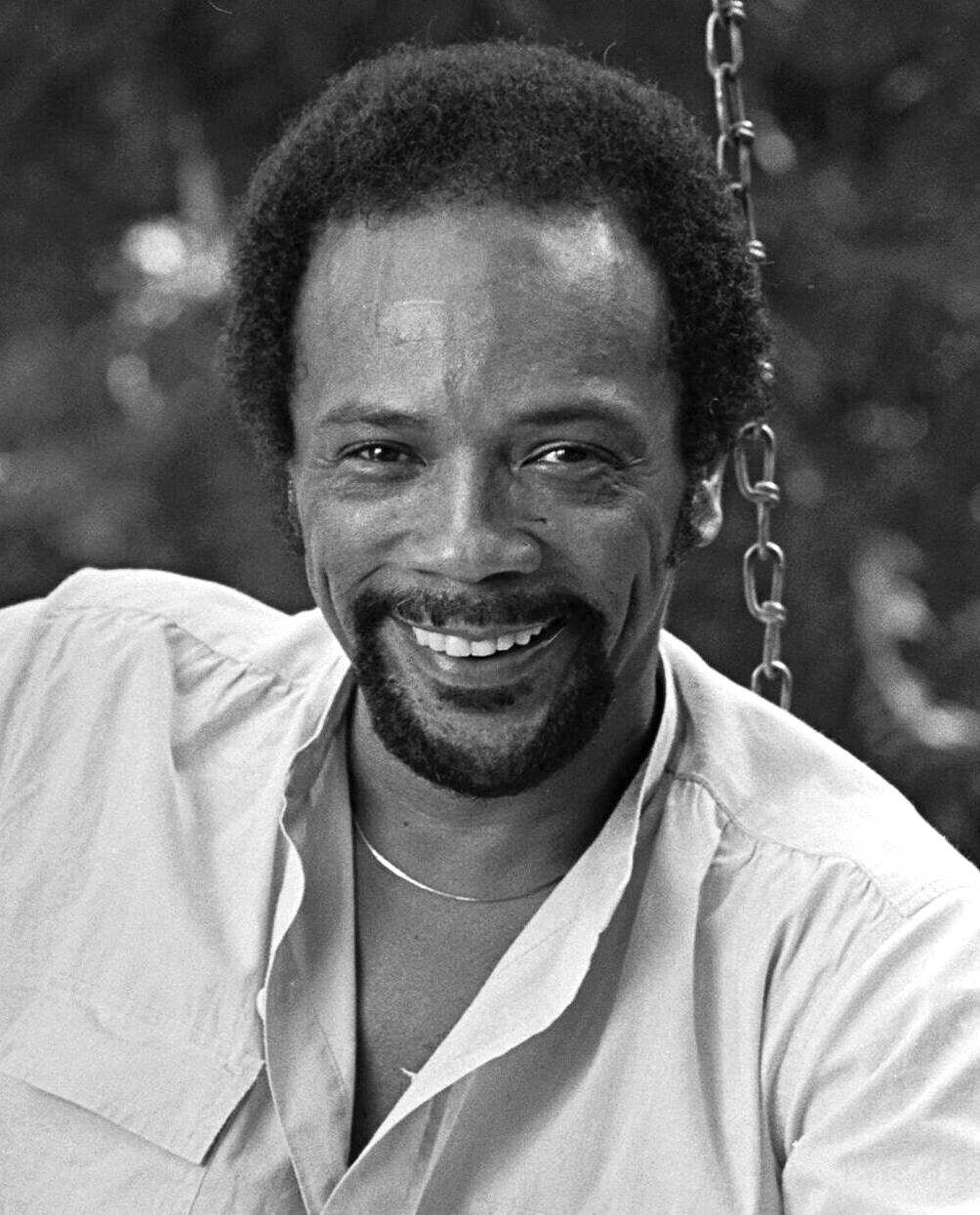
Quincy Jones

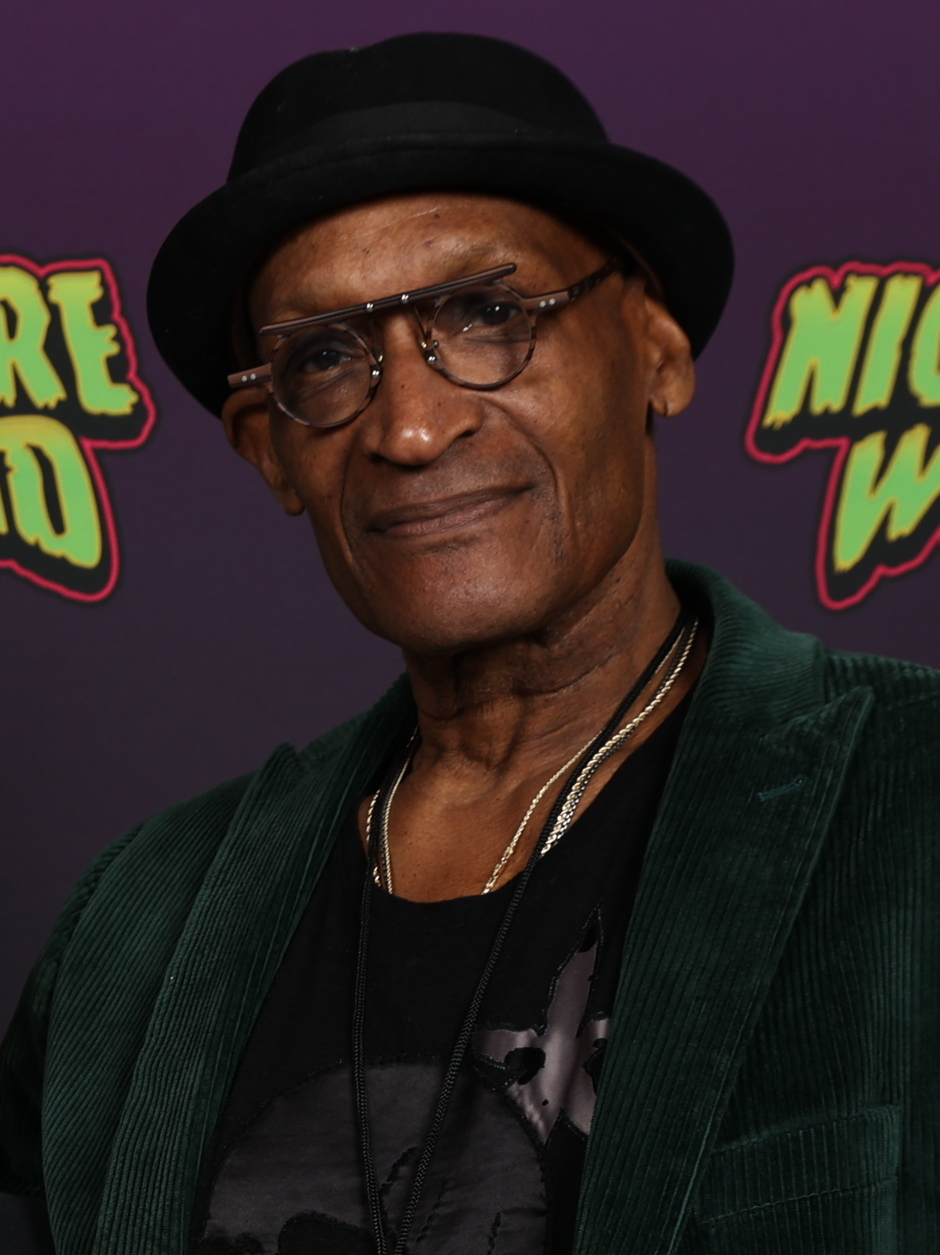
Tony Todd

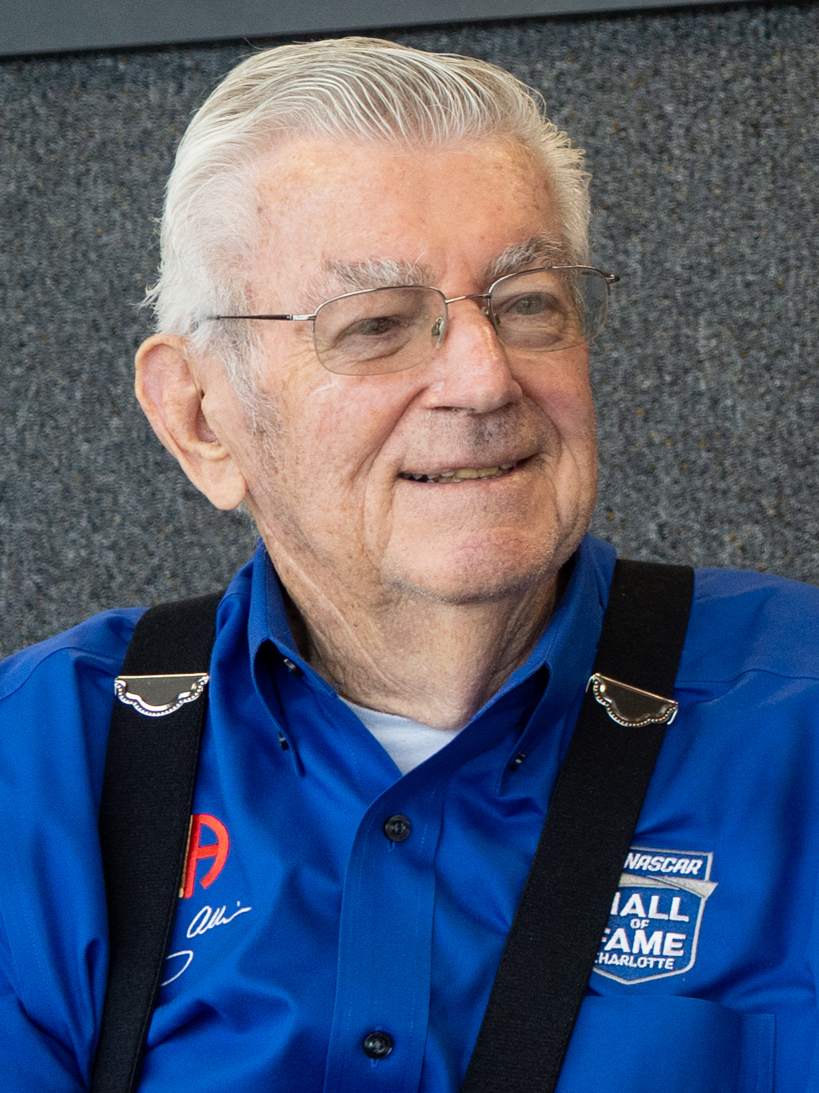
Bobby Allison

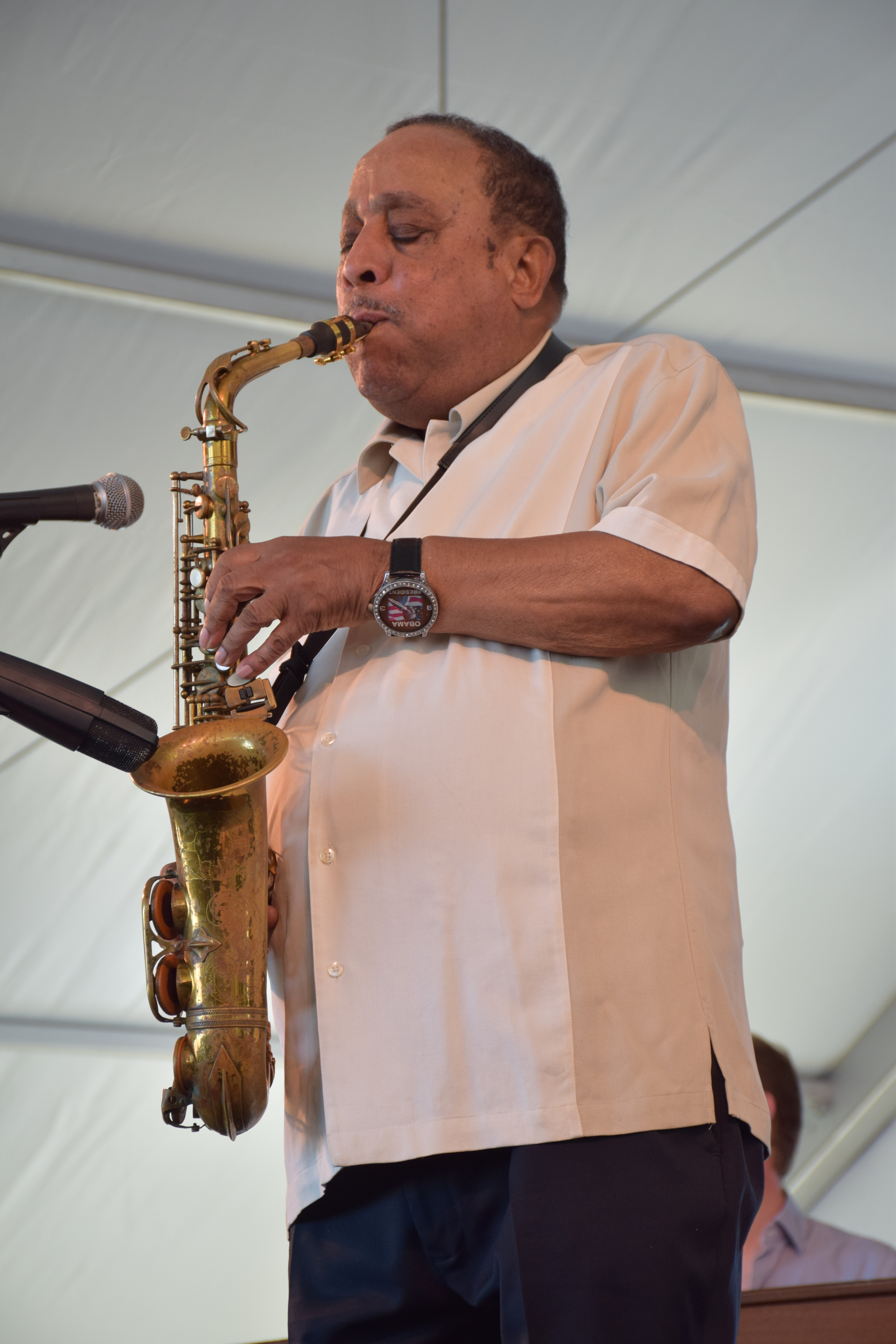
Lou Donaldson

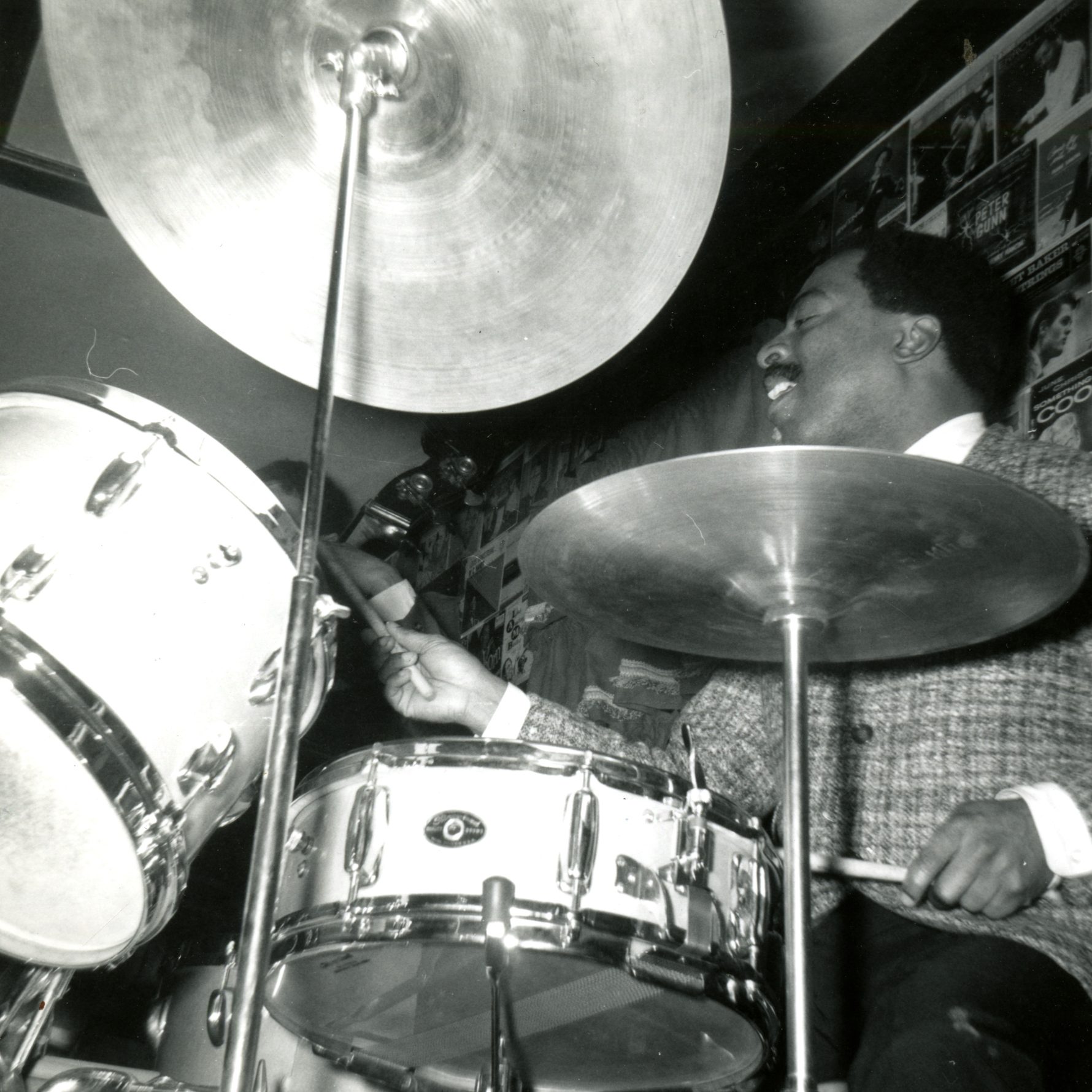
Roy Haynes

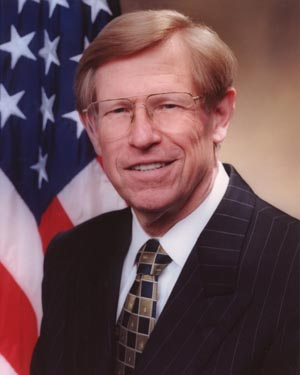
Theodore Olson

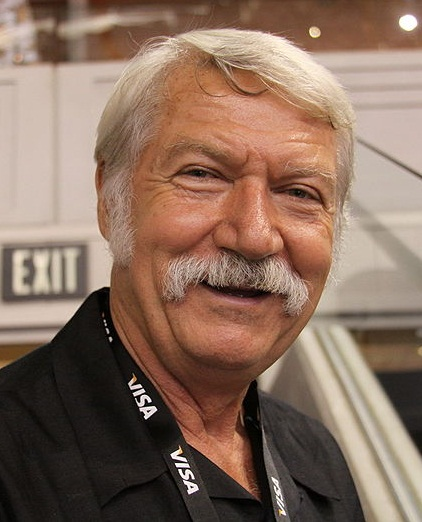
Béla Károlyi

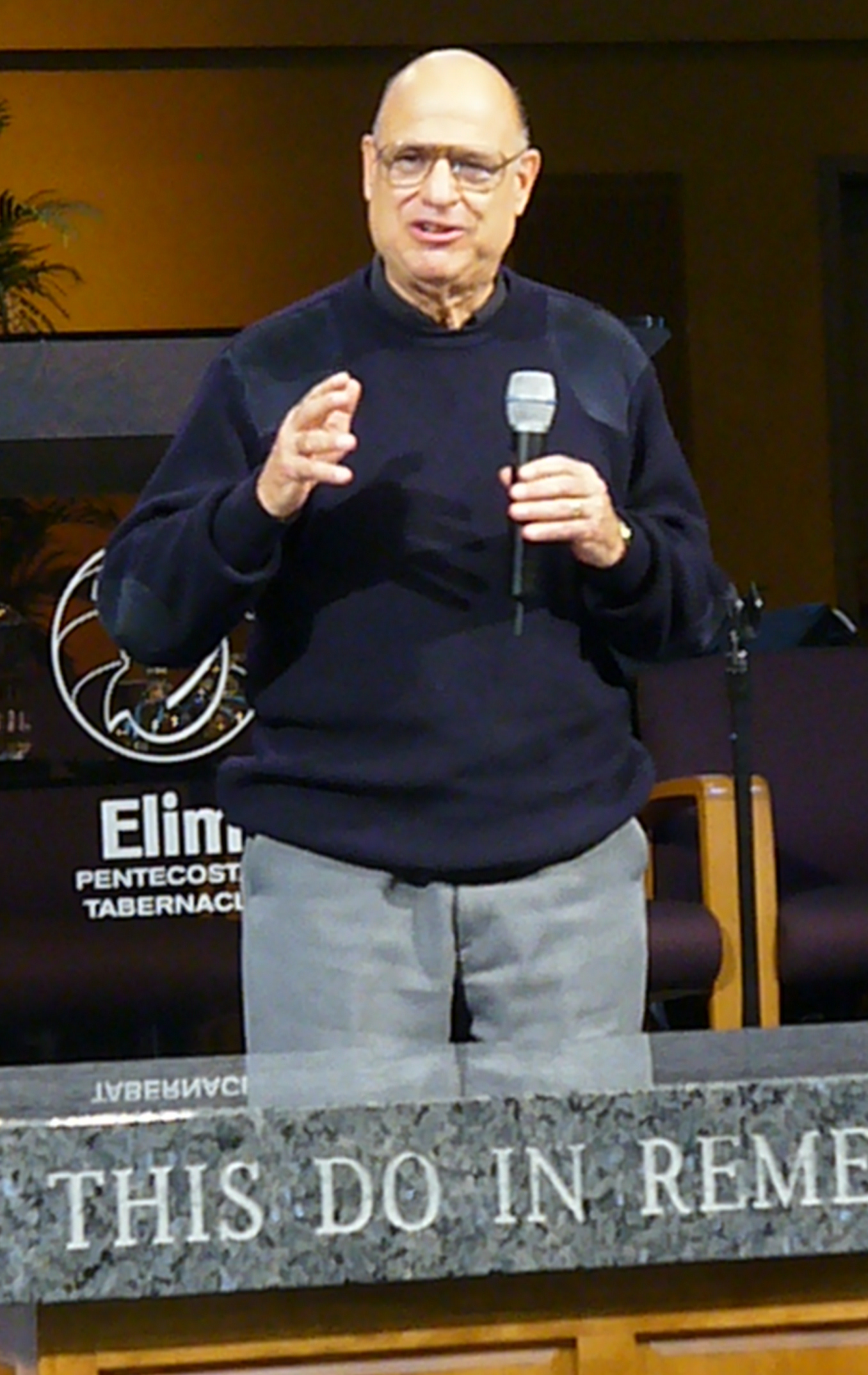
Tony Campolo

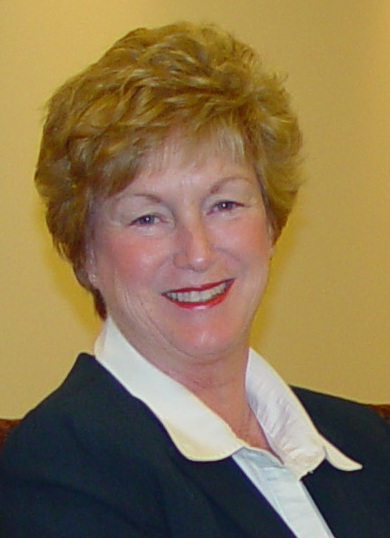
Jodi Rell

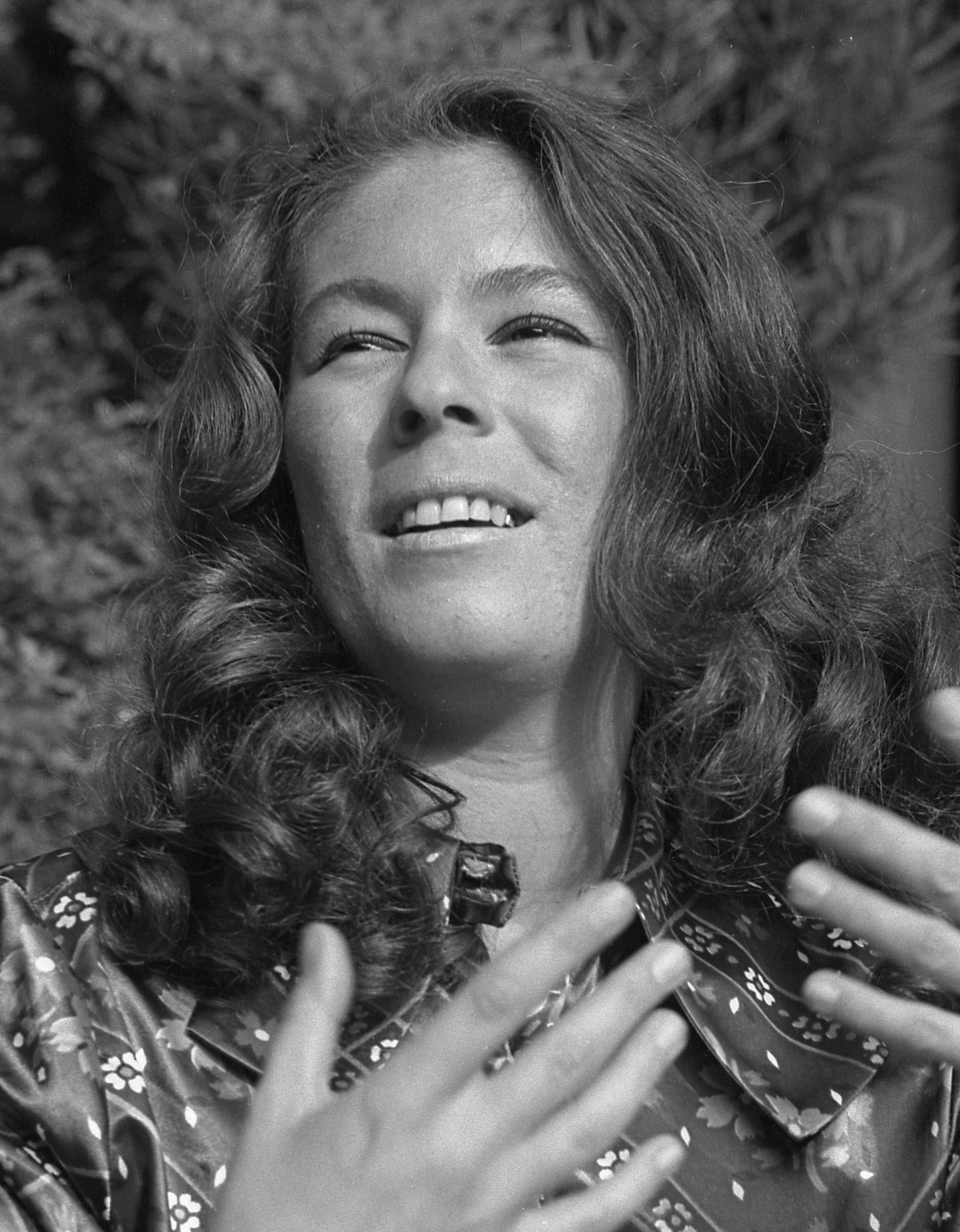
Alice Brock

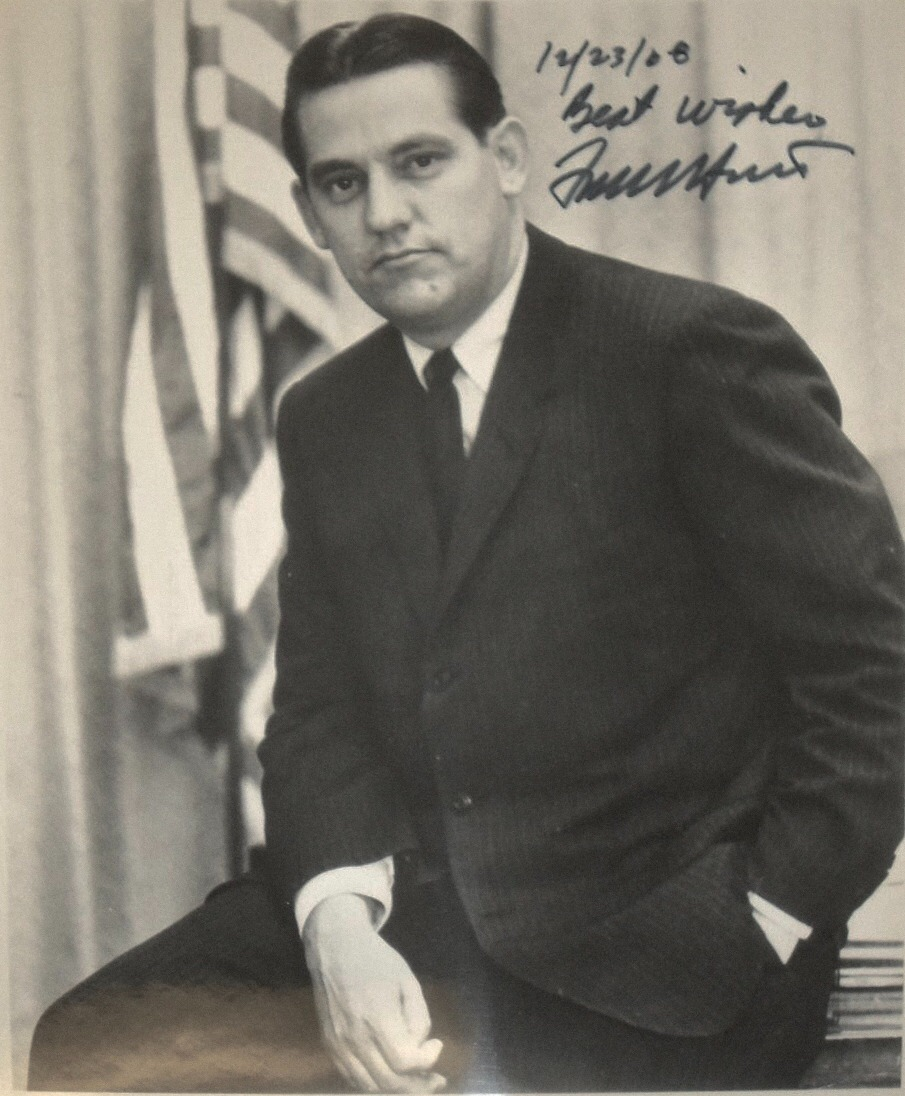
Fred R. Harris

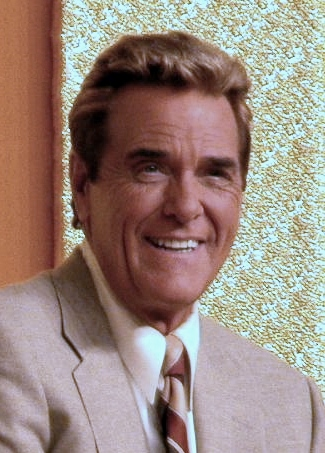
Chuck Woolery

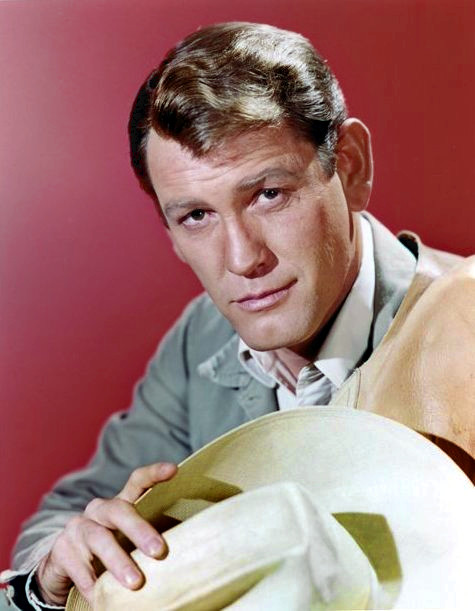
Earl Holliman

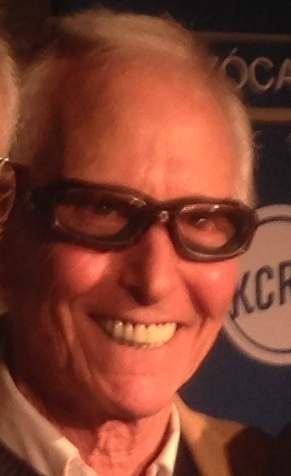
Jim Abrahams

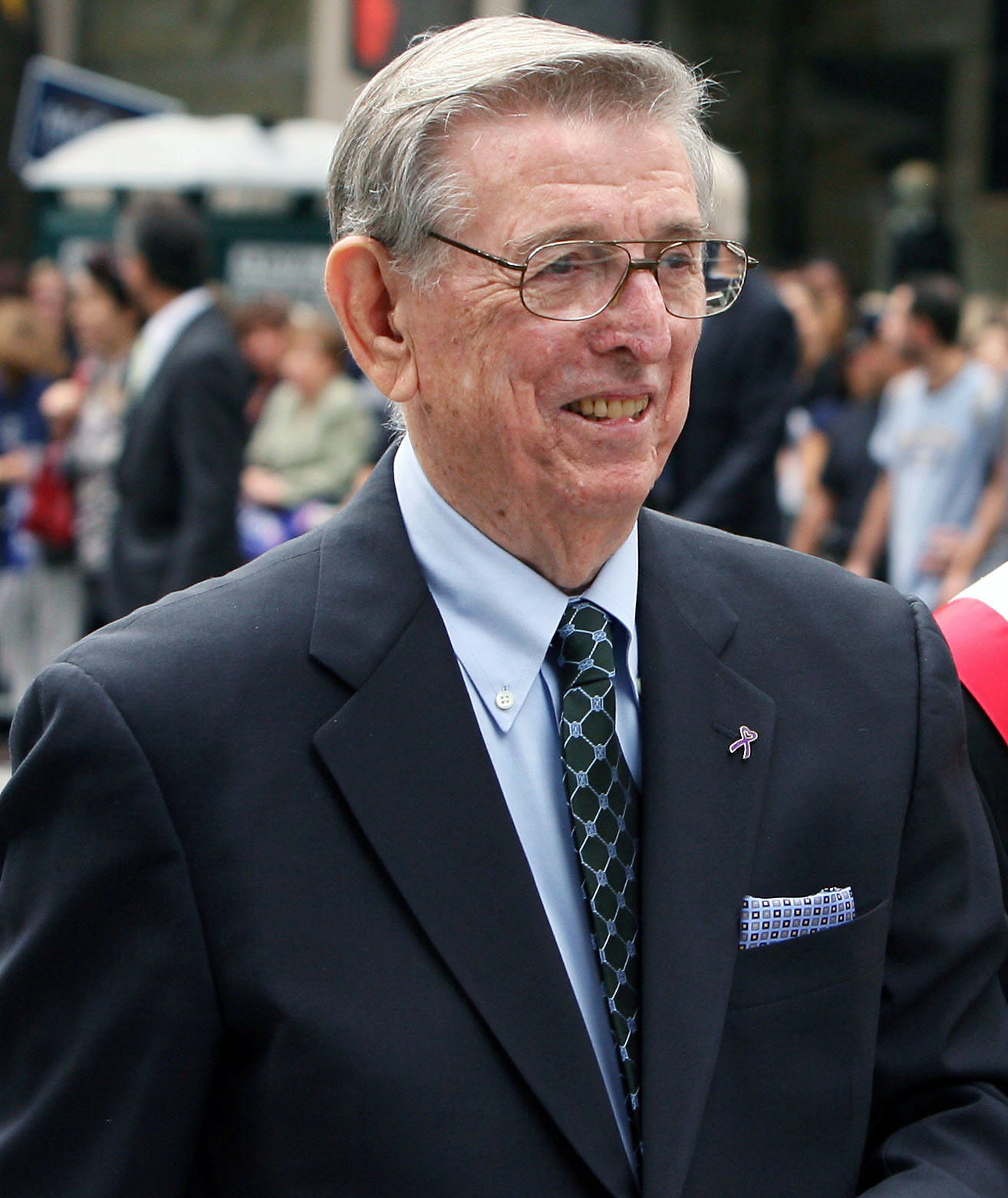
Lou Carnesecca

- November 1
  - William B. Bridges, 89, engineer and inventor (b. 1934)
  - Chuck Haytaian, 86, politician, speaker of the New Jersey General Assembly (1992–1996) (b. 1938)
  - Richard Bernard Moore, 59, convicted murderer (b. 1965)
  - Peanut, c. 7, Eastern grey squirrel, Instagram subject (b. 2017)
  - Alexander Pines, 79, chemist (b. 1945)
  - Ida G. Ruben, 95, politician, member of the Maryland Senate (1987–2007) and House of Delegates (1975–1987) (b. 1929)
- November 2
  - Mack Daughtry, 78, basketball player (Carolina Cougars, Harlem Globetrotters, Wilkes-Barre Barons) (b. 1946)
  - Jonathan Haze, 95, actor (Stakeout on Dope Street, The Little Shop of Horrors, The Terror) (b. 1929)
  - Dub Jones, 99, football player (Miami Seahawks, Brooklyn Dodgers, Cleveland Browns) and coach (b. 1924)
  - Alan Rachins, 82, actor (L. A. Law, Dharma & Greg, Batman: The Animated Series) (b. 1942)
- November 3
  - Flint Breckinridge, 64, politician, member of the Oklahoma House of Representatives (1993–1997) (b. 1960)
  - John Gottschalk, 81, businessman, CEO and publisher of Omaha World-Herald (1989–2008) and president of the Boy Scouts of America (2008–2010) (b. 1943)
  - Quincy Jones, 91, Hall of Fame composer (The Slender Thread, In the Heat of the Night), record producer (Thriller) and songwriter (b. 1933)
- November 4
  - Barbara T. Bowman, 96, early childhood education expert and co-founder of Erikson Institute (b. 1928)
  - Jonathan Brostoff, 41, politician, member of the Wisconsin State Assembly (2015–2022) and the Milwaukee Common Council (since 2022) (b. 1983)
  - Don Ferrarese, 95, baseball player (Baltimore Orioles, Cleveland Indians, Philadelphia Phillies) (b. 1929)
  - Jim Hoagland, 84, journalist (The Washington Post), Pulitzer Prize winner (1971, 1991) (b. 1940)
  - Jimmy Holley, 80, politician, member of the Alabama House of Representatives (1974–1994) and the Senate (1998–2022) (b. 1944)
  - Victor A. Lundy, 101, modernist architect (b. 1923)
  - Bernard Marcus, 95, businessman, co-founder and chairman of Home Depot (b. 1929)
  - David Maxwell, 81, politician, member of the Iowa House of Representatives (2013–2023) (b. 1943)
  - Tyka Nelson, 64, singer (b. 1960)
- November 5
  - Ben Baldanza, 62, economist and airline executive (Spirit Airlines) (b. 1961)
  - Elwood Edwards, 74, voice actor (America Online) (b. 1949)
  - William O'Gara, 92, politician, member of the Maine House of Representatives (1985–1997) and Senate (1997–2003) (b. 1931)
  - Jerry Reitman, 86, author, businessman, and executive (b. 1938)
  - Charlie Turner, 79, football player (Hamilton Tiger-Cats, Edmonton Eskimos, Winnipeg Blue Bombers) (b. 1944)
- November 6
  - Dorothy Allison, 75, writer (b. 1949)
  - Don Bosseler, 88, football player (Washington Redskins) (b. 1936)
  - Tony Todd, 69, actor (Candyman, Platoon, Night of the Living Dead) (b. 1954)
- November 7
  - Bruce Degen, 79, illustrator (The Magic School Bus) (b. 1945)
  - Louis Edward Gelineau, 96, Roman Catholic prelate, bishop of Providence (1972–1997) (b. 1928)
- November 8
  - George Bohanon, 87, jazz trombonist (b. 1937)
  - James Buskey, 87, politician, member of the Alabama House of Representatives (1976–2018) (b. 1937)
  - George Lehmann, 83, basketball player (St. Louis/Atlanta Hawks, New York Nets) (b. 1941)
  - Peter Loukianoff, 76, Russian Orthodox prelate (b. 1948)
  - Elizabeth Nunez, 80, novelist (Anna In-Between) (b. 1944
  - Jerry M. Patterson, 90, politician, member of the U.S. House of Representatives (1975–1985) (b. 1934)
  - Brian Wheeler, 62, basketball announcer (Portland Trail Blazers) (b. 1961/1962)
- November 9
  - Bobby Allison, 86, Hall of Fame race car driver, founder of the Alabama Gang and three-time Daytona 500 winner (b. 1937)
  - Lou Donaldson, 98, jazz saxophonist (b. 1926)
  - Felice D. Gaer, 78, human rights activist (b. 1946)
  - Judith Jamison, 81, dancer and choreographer (b. 1943)
  - Ella Jenkins, 100, singer-songwriter (b. 1924)
  - James Patrick Keleher, 93, Roman Catholic prelate, bishop of Belleville (1984–1993) and archbishop of Kansas City (1993–2005) (b. 1931)
  - Marty Kuehnert, 78, baseball executive (Tohoku Rakuten Golden Eagles) (b. 1946) (death announced on this date)
  - J. Reginald Murphy, 90, business executive and journalist (The Atlanta Constitution, The Baltimore Sun) (b. 1934)
  - George Wilkins, 90, composer (b. 1934) (death announced on this date)
- November 10
  - Mary Pat Clarke, 83, politician, member of the Baltimore City Council (1975–1983, 2004–2020) (b. 1943)
  - Sandra Gilbert, 87, literary critic and poet (b. 1936)
  - John LaBarge, 72, politician, member of the Vermont House of Representatives (1993–2003) (b. 1952
  - Dallas Long, 84, shot putter, Olympic champion (1964) (b. 1940)
  - Kenneth Oliver, 78–79, politician, member of Baltimore City Council (2002–2014) (b. 1945) (death announced on this date)
  - Tim Sullivan, 76, science fiction author (b. 1946)
- November 11
  - Gerry Faust, 89, football coach (Notre Dame Fighting Irish, Akron Zips) (b. 1935)
  - Gloria Fox, 82, politician, member of the Massachusetts House of Representatives (1987–2017) (b. 1942)
  - Clay Foster Lee Jr., 94, Methodist bishop (b. 1930)
  - John Peaslee, 73, television writer and producer (Coach, According to Jim, Liv and Maddie) (b. 1951)
  - John Robinson, 89, football coach (USC Trojans, Los Angeles Rams) (b. 1935)
- November 12
  - Joanne Chory, 69, plant biologist and geneticist (b. 1955)
  - Roy Haynes, 99, jazz drummer (b. 1925)
  - Fred Kessler, 84, politician and judge, member of the Wisconsin State Assembly (2005–2019) (b. 1940)
  - Thomas E. Kurtz, 96, mathematician and computer scientist (b. 1928)
  - Camay Calloway Murphy, 97, educator (b. 1927)
- November 13
  - John Hambrick, 79, politician, member of the Nevada Assembly (2008–2020) (b. 1945)
  - Elizabeth Kridl Valkenier, 98, Polish-born art historian (b. 1926)
  - Spencer Lawton, 81, district attorney (b. 1943)
  - Theodore Olson, 84, lawyer, U.S. solicitor general (2001–2004) (b. 1940)
  - Shel Talmy, 87, record producer ("You Really Got Me", "My Generation", "Friday on My Mind") (b. 1937)
- November 14
  - Tommy Alverson, 74, country singer-songwriter (b. 1950)
  - William J. Lavery, 86, politician and jurist, member of the Connecticut House of Representatives (1967–1971), judge of the Connecticut Appellate Court (1989–2007) (b. 1938)
- November 15
  - Helen Ginger Berrigan, 76, American jurist, judge (since 1994) and chief judge (2001–2008) of the U.S. District Court for Eastern Louisiana (b. 1946)
  - Al Ferrara, 84, baseball player (Los Angeles Dodgers, San Diego Padres, Cincinnati Reds) (b. 1939)
  - Béla Károlyi, 82, Hungarian-born Hall of Fame gymnastics coach (b. 1942)
  - Dick Packer, 90, soccer player (Uhrik Truckers, 1956 Olympics) (b. 1934)
  - Paul Teal, 35, actor (One Tree Hill, Deep Water, The Staircase) (b. 1989)
- November 16
  - Richard V. Allen, 88, public servant, national security advisor (1981–1982) (b. 1936)
  - Esther Haywood, 84, politician, member of the Missouri House of Representatives (2001–2009) (b. 1940)
  - Eunice Parsons, 108, modernist artist (b. 1916)
  - Sir Lady Java, 82, drag performer and transgender rights activist (b. 1942)
  - Pat Koch Thaler, 92, educator (b. 1932)
  - Clifton R. Wharton Jr., 98, academic and diplomat, deputy secretary of state (1993) (b. 1926)
- November 17
  - Wesley Cox, 69, basketball player (Golden State Warriors) (b. 1955)
  - John Ray Godfrey, 80, basketball player (Abilene Christian Wildcats) (b. 1944)
  - Jim Knaub, 68, wheelchair marathon athlete and actor (The Man Who Loved Women), five-time Boston Marathon winner (b. 1958)
- November 18
  - Mike C. Frietze Jr., 97, politician, member of the New Mexico House of Representatives (1965) (b. 1927)
  - Arthur Frommer, 95, travel writer, founder of Frommer's (b. 1929)
  - Karl Kohn, 98, Austrian-born composer, teacher and pianist (b. 1928)
  - Bob Love, 81, basketball player (Chicago Bulls) (b. 1942)
  - Manfred Ohrenstein, 99, American lawyer and politician (b. 1925)
- November 19
  - Patty Berg, 82, politician, member of the California State Assembly (2002–2008) (b. 1942)
  - Tony Campolo, 89, sociologist and Baptist minister (b. 1935)
  - Diva Gray, 72, singer (Chic) (b. 1952)
  - Ron O'Brien, 86, diving coach and author (b. 1938)
  - Saafir, 54, rapper and producer (b. 1970)
- November 20
  - Marshall Brain, 63, author, public speaker and entrepreneur, creator of HowStuffWorks (b. 1961)
  - Tommy Hart, 80, football player (San Francisco 49ers, Chicago Bears, New Orleans Saints) (b. 1944) (death announced on this date)
  - J. Lawrence Irving, 89, jurist, judge of U.S. District Court for Southern California (1982–1990) (b. 1935)
  - Dahir Mohammed, 51, Ethiopian-born soccer player (Long Island Rough Riders) (b. 1973)
  - Andy Paley, 72, musician (The Paley Brothers, The Modern Lovers), record producer, and composer (SpongeBob SquarePants) (b. 1952)
  - Mike Pinera, 76, guitarist (Blues Image, Iron Butterfly, Alice Cooper) (b. 1948)
  - Jodi Rell, 78, politician, governor (2004–2011) and lieutenant governor (1995–2004) of Connecticut (b. 1946)
- November 21
  - Alice Brock, 83, artist and restaurateur, inspiration for "Alice's Restaurant" (b. 1941)
  - Ronald Everson, 94, politician, member of the Minnesota House of Representatives (1961–1971) (b. 1930)
  - Richard J. Sklba, 89, Roman Catholic prelate, auxiliary bishop of Milwaukee (1979–2010) (b. 1935)
- November 22
  - Bob Hattaway, 88, politician, member of the Florida House of Representatives (1974–1982) (b. 1936)
  - Toni Price, 63, country blues singer (b. 1961)
  - Kirk Schuring, 72, politician, speaker of the Ohio House of Representatives (2018), president pro tempore (since 2023) and twice member of the Ohio Senate (b. 1952)
  - Harry Williams, 80, singer (Bloodstone) (b. 1944)
- November 23
  - Fred R. Harris, 94, politician, member of the U.S. Senate (1964–1973) (b. 1930)
  - Susan Pitt, 76, Olympic swimmer (1964) (b. 1948)
  - Fred L. Smith, 83, economist and political writer, founder of Competitive Enterprise Institute (b. 1940)
  - Walter King Stapleton, 90, jurist, judge of the U.S. District Court for the District of Delaware (1970–1985) and the U.S. Court of Appeals for the Third Circuit (since 1985) (b. 1934)
  - Michael Villella, 84, actor (The Slumber Party Massacre, Love Letters, Wild Orchid) (b. 1939/1940)
  - Chuck Woolery, 83, game show host (Wheel of Fortune, Love Connection) and musician (The Avant-Garde) (b. 1941)
- November 24
  - Barbara Taylor Bradford, 91, British-born novelist (A Woman of Substance, Hold the Dream) (b. 1933)
  - Helen Gallagher, 98, actress (Hazel Flagg, Ryan's Hope, Pal Joey) (b. 1926)
  - Tarky Lombardi Jr., 95, politician, member of the New York Senate (1967–1992) (b. 1929)
  - Carl Runk, 88, college lacrosse and football coach (Towson University) (b. 1935/1936)
  - Bruce Thompson, 59, politician, member of the Georgia State Senate (2013–2023) and Georgia Labor Commissioner (since 2023) (b. 1965)
  - Joe Zuger, 84, football player (Detroit Lions, Hamilton Tiger-Cats) (b. 1940)
- November 25
  - Earl Holliman, 96, actor (Police Woman, The Rainmaker, The Twilight Zone) (b. 1928)
  - Hal Lindsey, 95, evangelist and Christian writer (The Late Great Planet Earth) (b. 1929)
  - Ernie McMillan, 86, football player (St. Louis Cardinals, Green Bay Packers) (b. 1938)
  - Harris Rosen, 85, hotelier, investor, and philanthropist (Rosen Jewish Community Center) (b. 1939)
  - Malcolm Smith, 83, Canadian-born motorcycle racer (b. 1941)
- November 26
  - Jim Abrahams, 80, film director and writer (Airplane!, The Naked Gun, Hot Shots!) (b. 1944)
  - Bob Bryar, 44, drummer (My Chemical Romance) (b. 1979) (body discovered on this date)
  - Leah Kunkel, 76, singer and attorney (b. 1948)
  - Scott L. Schwartz, 65, actor (Savate, Fire Down Below, Ocean's), stuntman and wrestler (b. 1959)
  - Malcolm Smith, 83, Canadian-born motorcycle racer (b. 1941)
- November 27
  - Artt Frank, 91, jazz drummer and biographer (Chet Baker) (b. 1933)
  - Bob Kelly, 97, baseball player (Chicago Cubs, Cincinnati Redlegs, Cleveland Indians) (b. 1927)
  - Mary McGee, 87, Hall of Fame motorcycle racer (b. 1936)
  - Adam Somner, 57, film producer and first assistant director (Licorice Pizza, Blitz, West Side Story) (b. 1966/1967)
- November 28
  - Bill Battle, 82, football player (Alabama Crimson Tide), coach (Tennessee Volunteers) and executive, founder of the CLC (b. 1941)
  - Joseph Serra, 84, politician, member of the Connecticut House of Representatives (1993–2021) (b. 1940)
- November 29
  - Morton I. Abramowitz, 91, diplomat, assistant secretary of state (1985–1989) and ambassador to Thailand (1978–1981) and Turkey (1989–1991) (b. 1933)
  - Marshall Brickman, 85, screenwriter (Annie Hall, Manhattan) and playwright (Jersey Boys), Oscar winner (1978) (b. 1939)
  - Bob Gable, 90, politician and businessman (b. 1934) (death announced on this date)
  - Will Cullen Hart, 53, musician (The Olivia Tremor Control, Circulatory System), co-founder of Elephant 6 (b. 1971)
  - Christian Juttner, 60, actor (Return from Witch Mountain, I Wanna Hold Your Hand, The Swarm) (b. 1964)
  - Thirman L. Milner, 91, politician, mayor of Hartford, Connecticut (1981–1987) (b. 1933)
  - Wayne Northrop, 77, actor (Dynasty, Days of Our Lives, Port Charles) (b. 1947)
  - Peter Westbrook, 72, fencer, Olympic bronze medalist (1984) (b. 1952)
- November 30
  - Lou Carnesecca, 99, Hall of Fame basketball coach (New York Nets, St. John's Red Storm) (b. 1925)
  - Howard W. Peak, 75, politician, mayor of San Antonio (1997–2001) (b. 1948)
  - Marianne Preger-Simon, 95, dancer and choreographer (b. 1929) (death announced on this date)
  - Robert Skoglund, 88, humorist, columnist, and radio personality (Maine Public Radio) (b. 1936)

== December ==
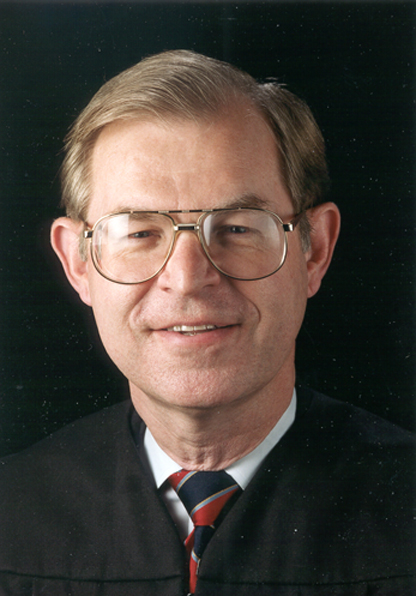
David Prosser Jr.

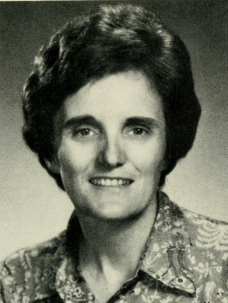
Marie E. Howe

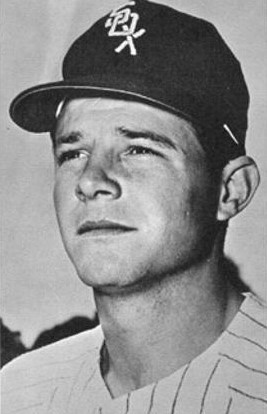
Bill Melton

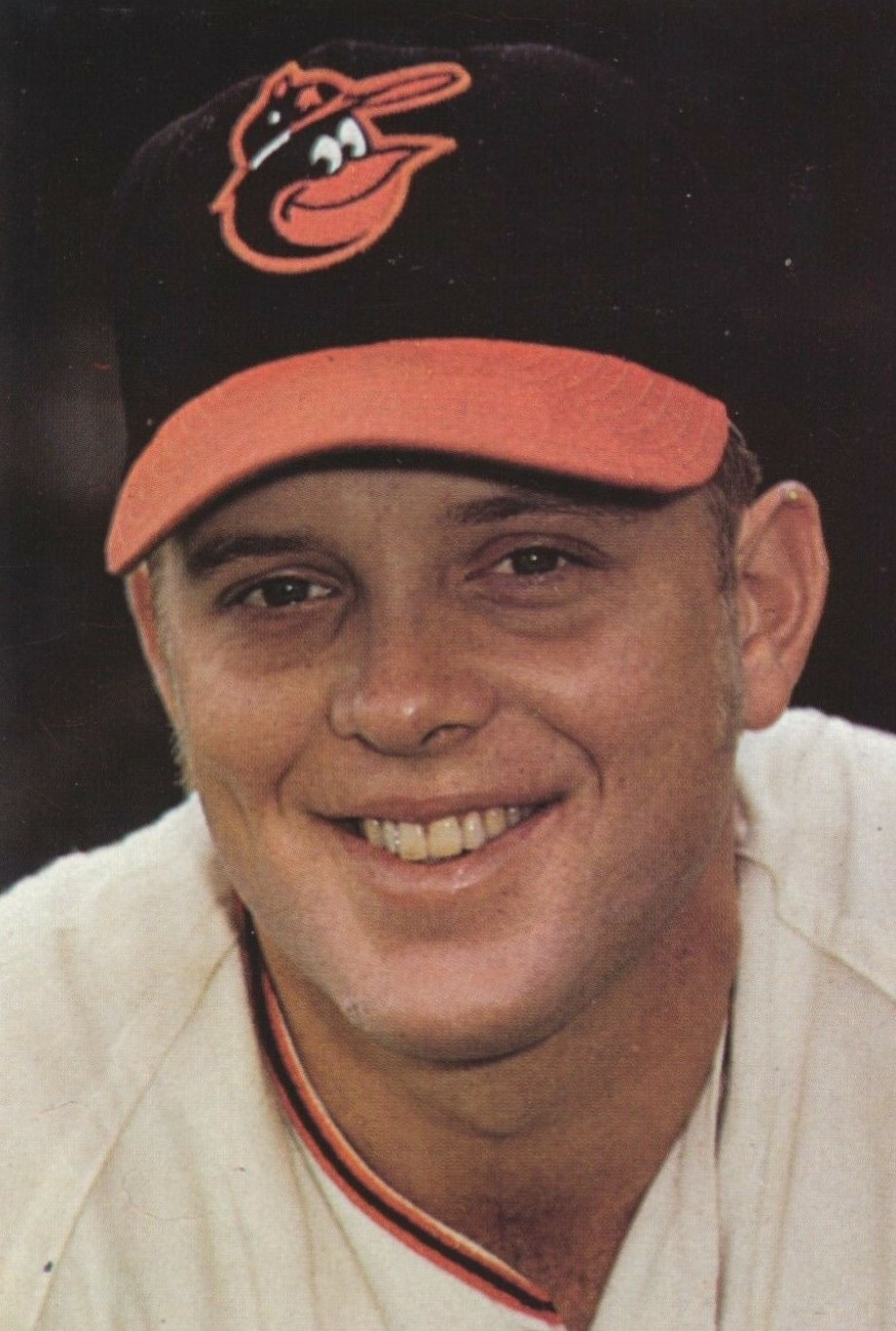
Merv Rettenmund

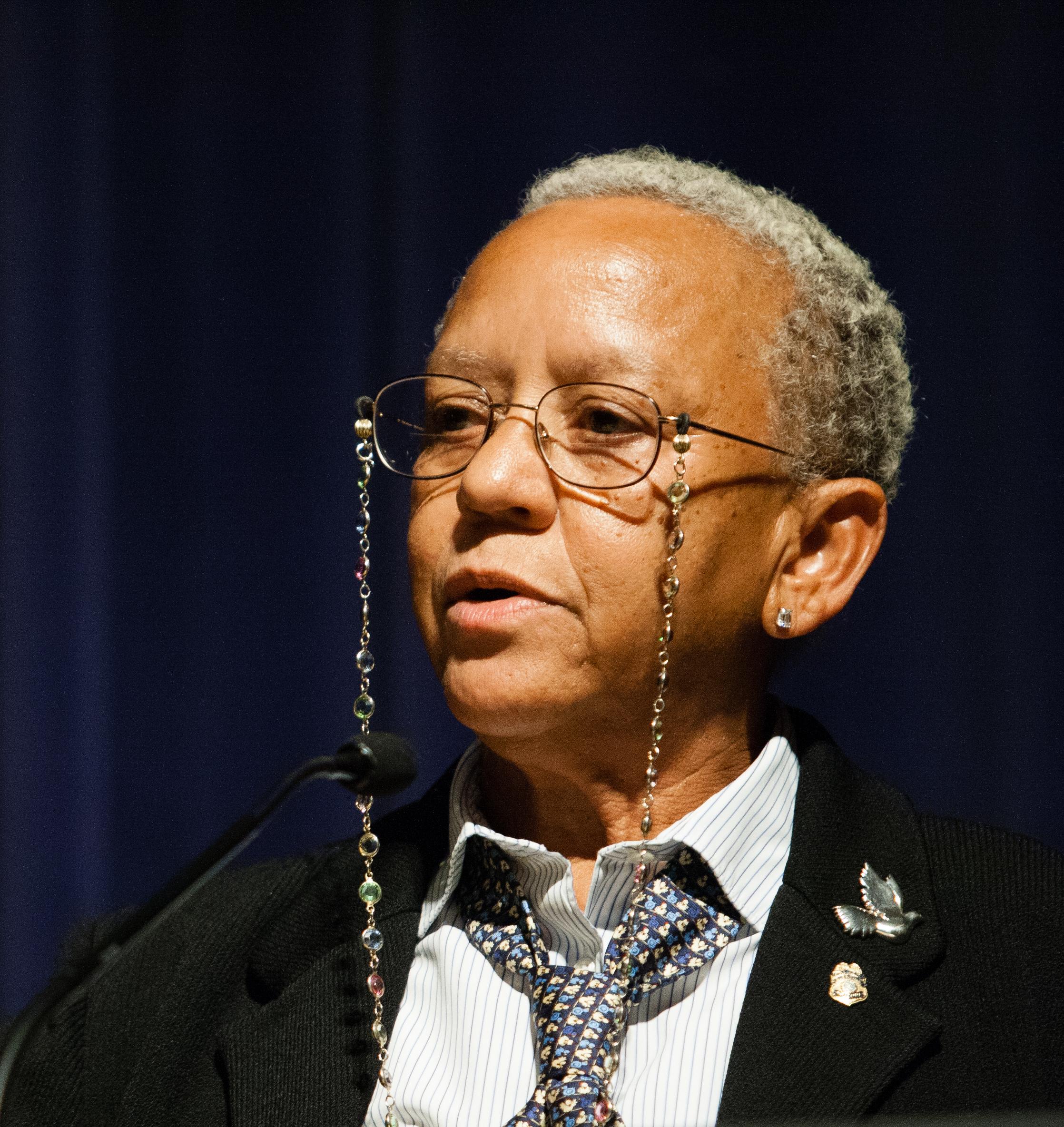
Nikki Giovanni

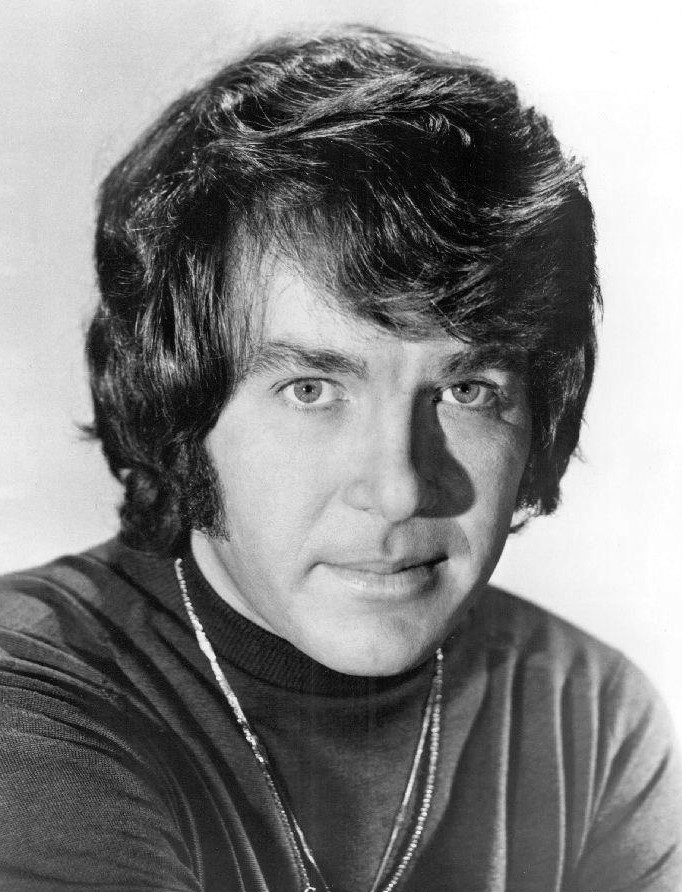
Michael Cole

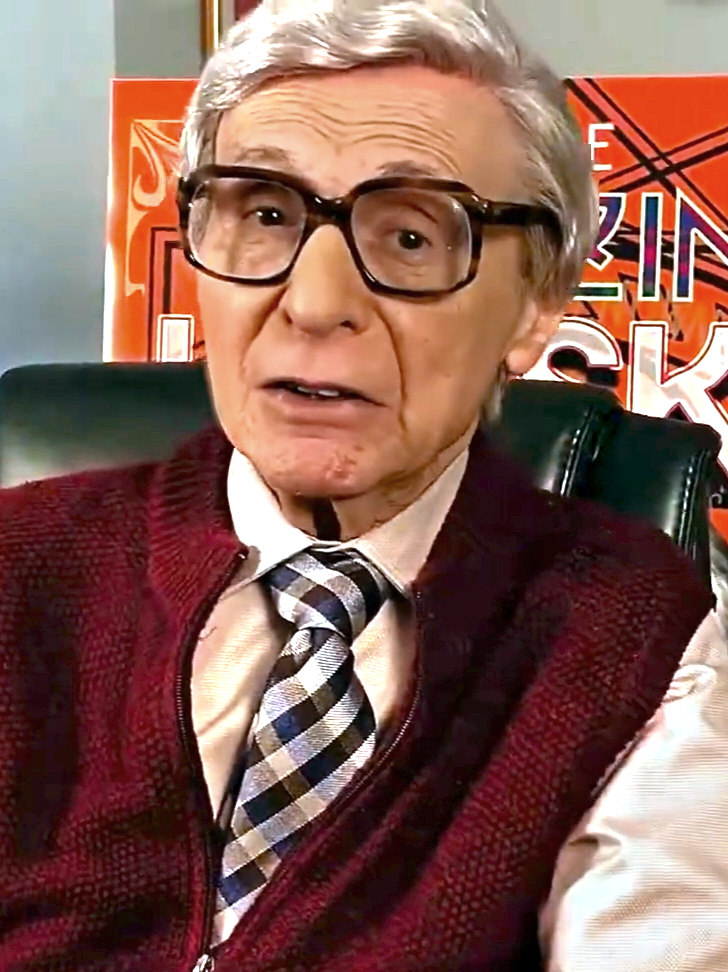
Kreskin

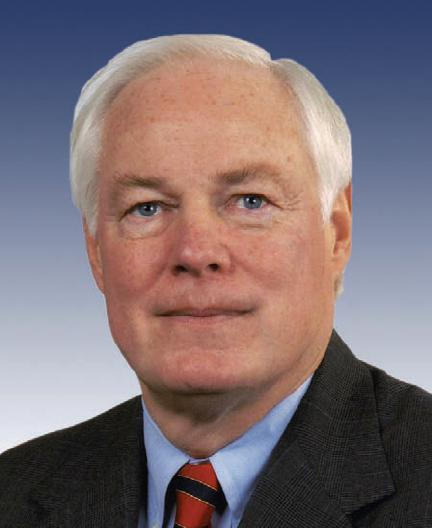
Jim Leach

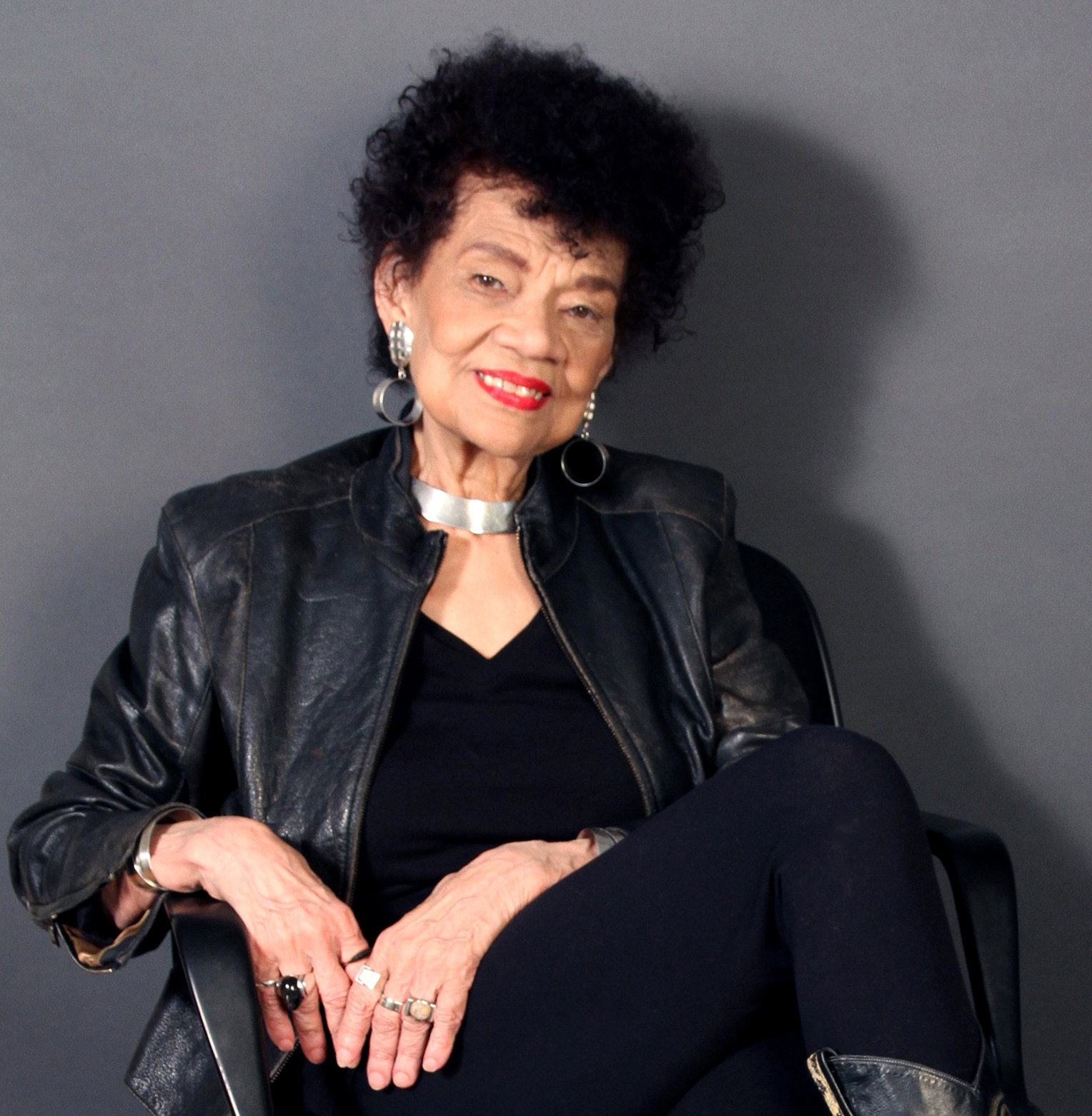
Lorraine O'Grady

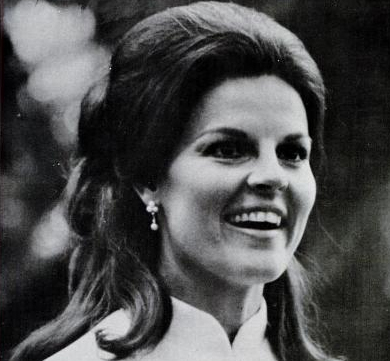
Anita Bryant

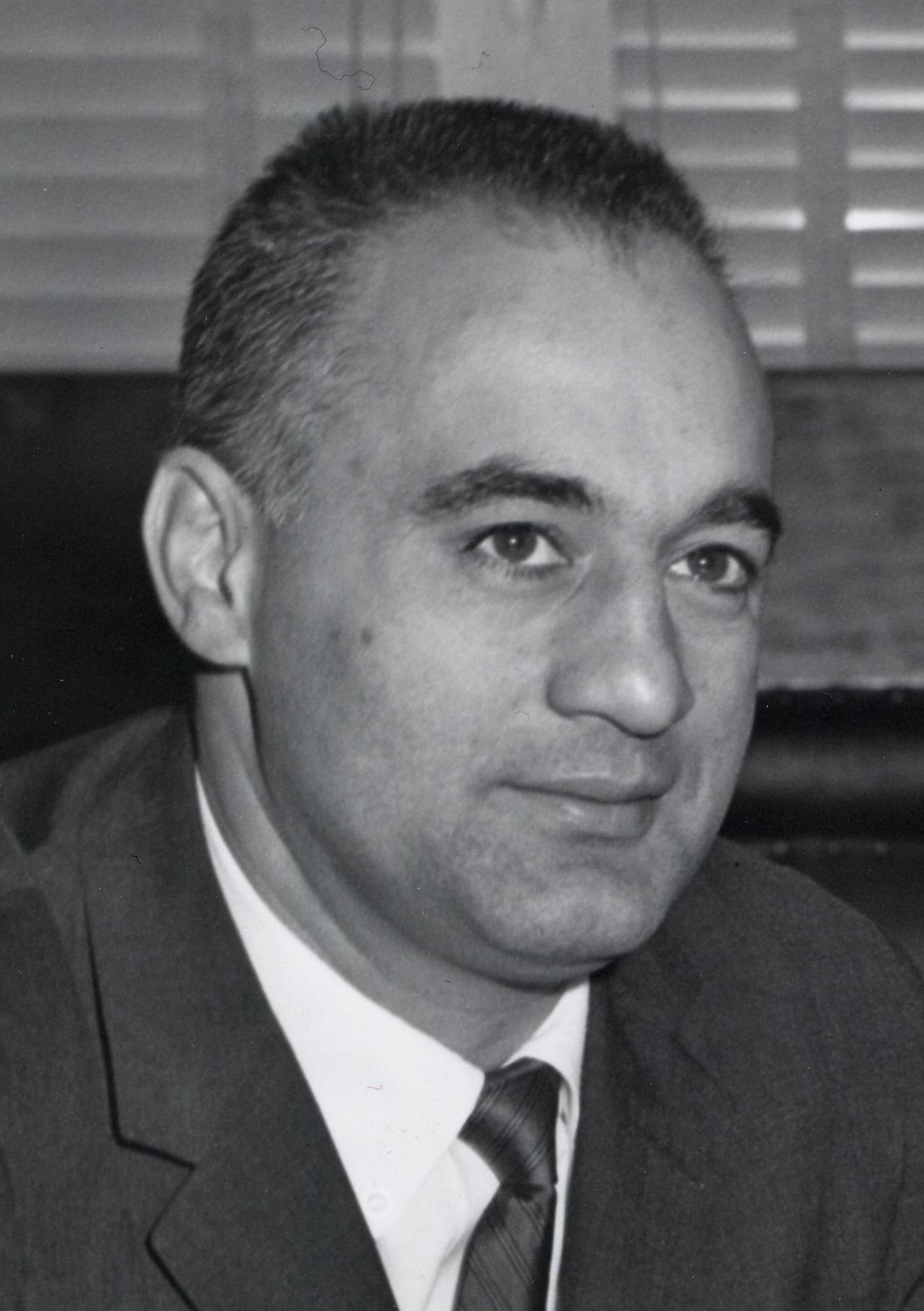
Francis Bellotti

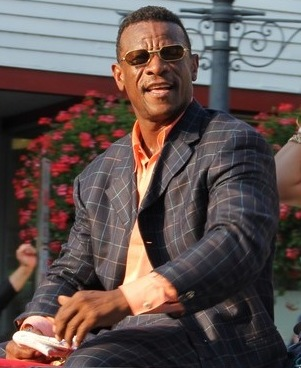
Rickey Henderson

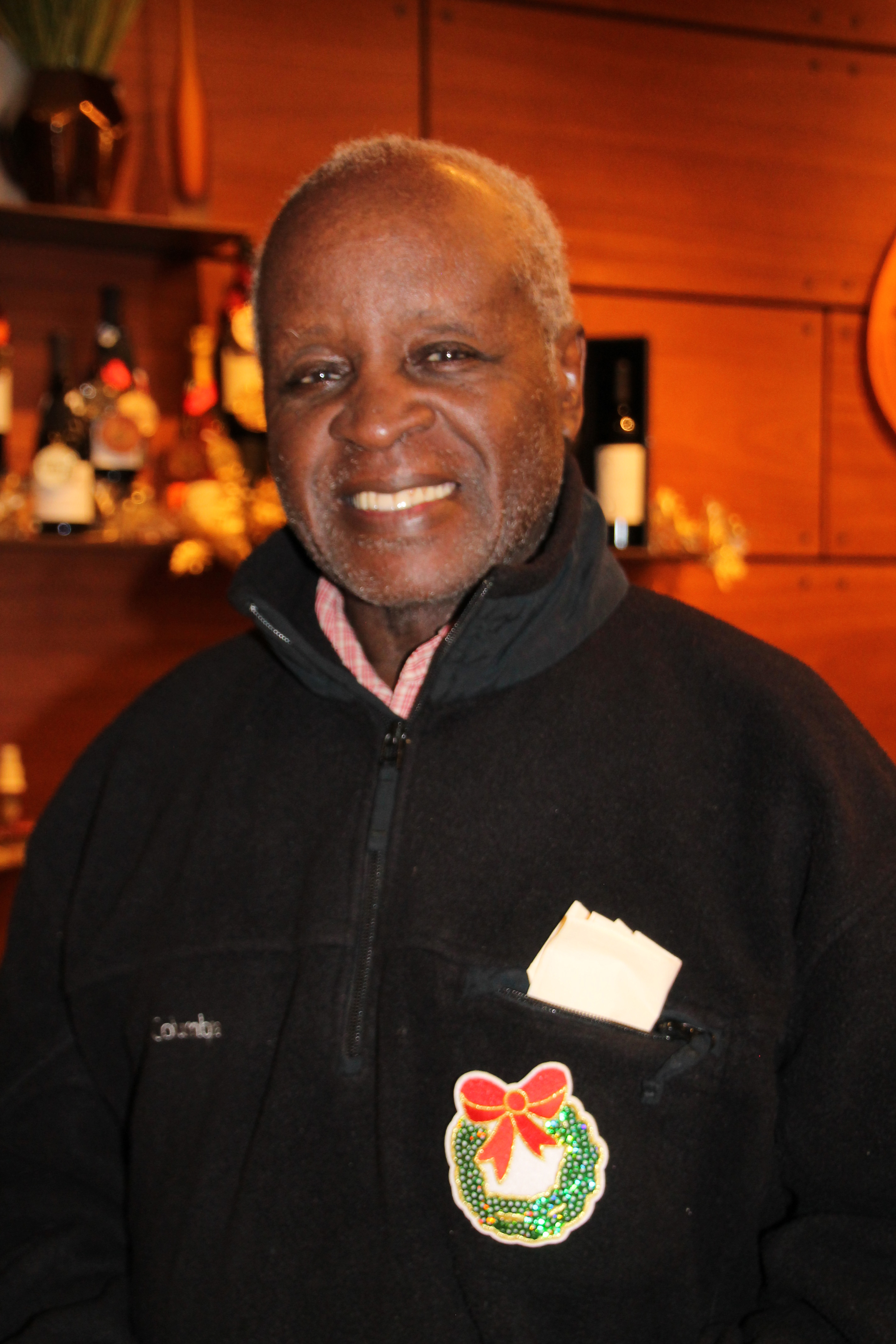
Art Evans

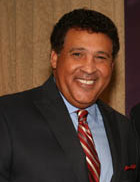
Greg Gumbel

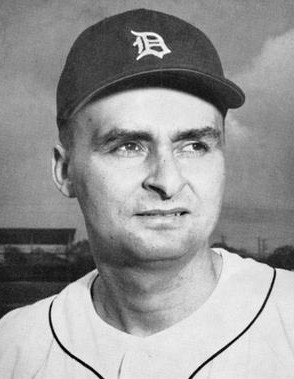
Charlie Maxwell

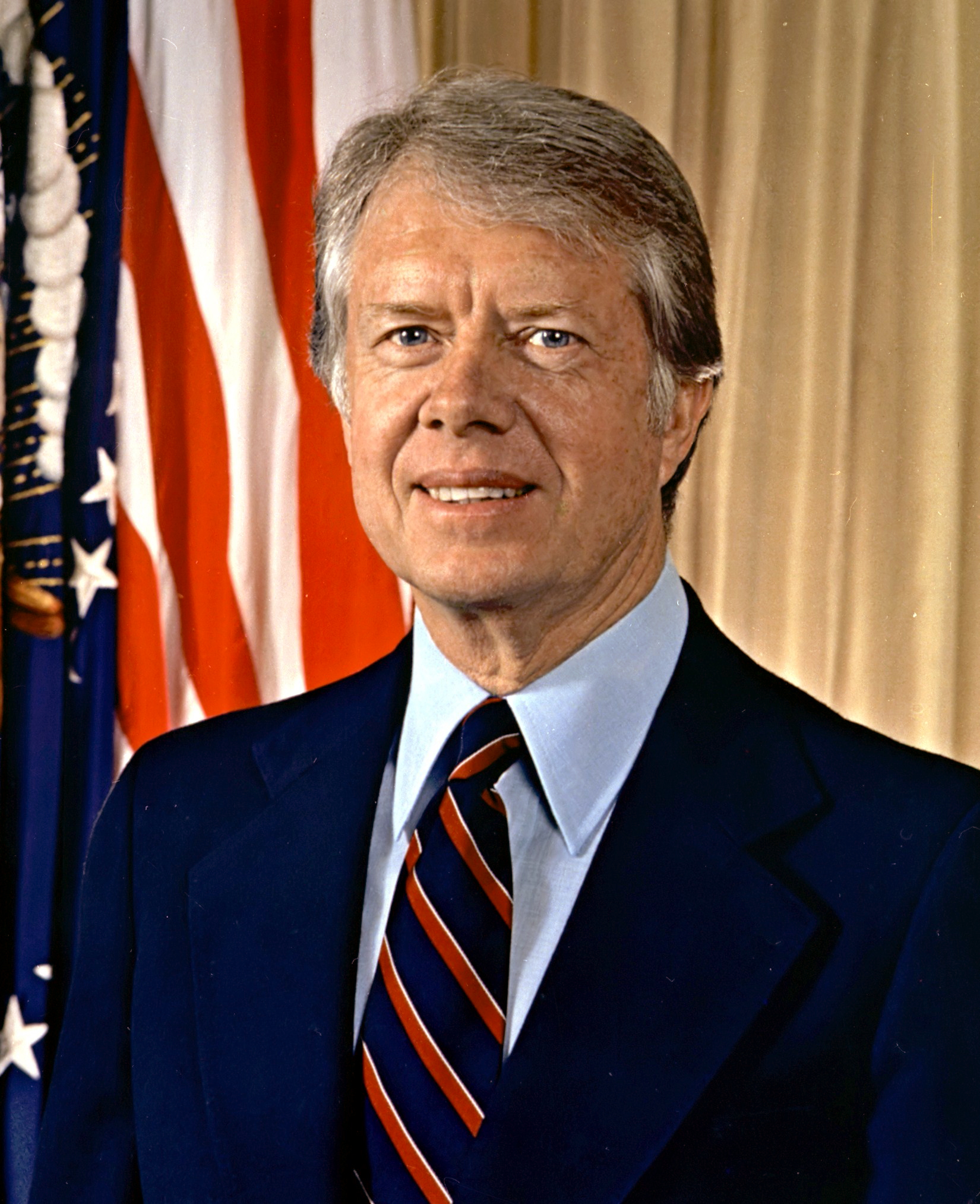
Jimmy Carter

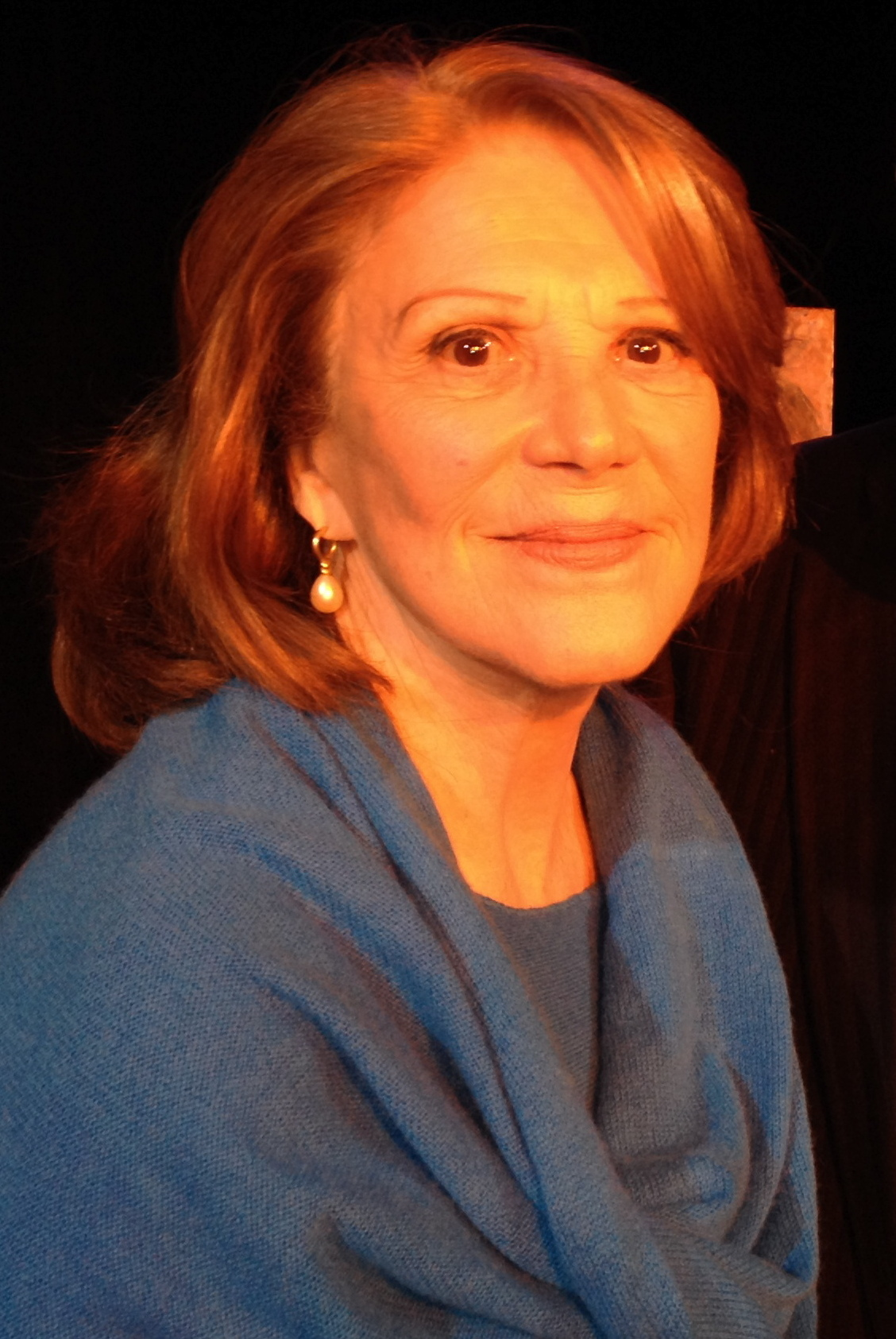
Linda Lavin

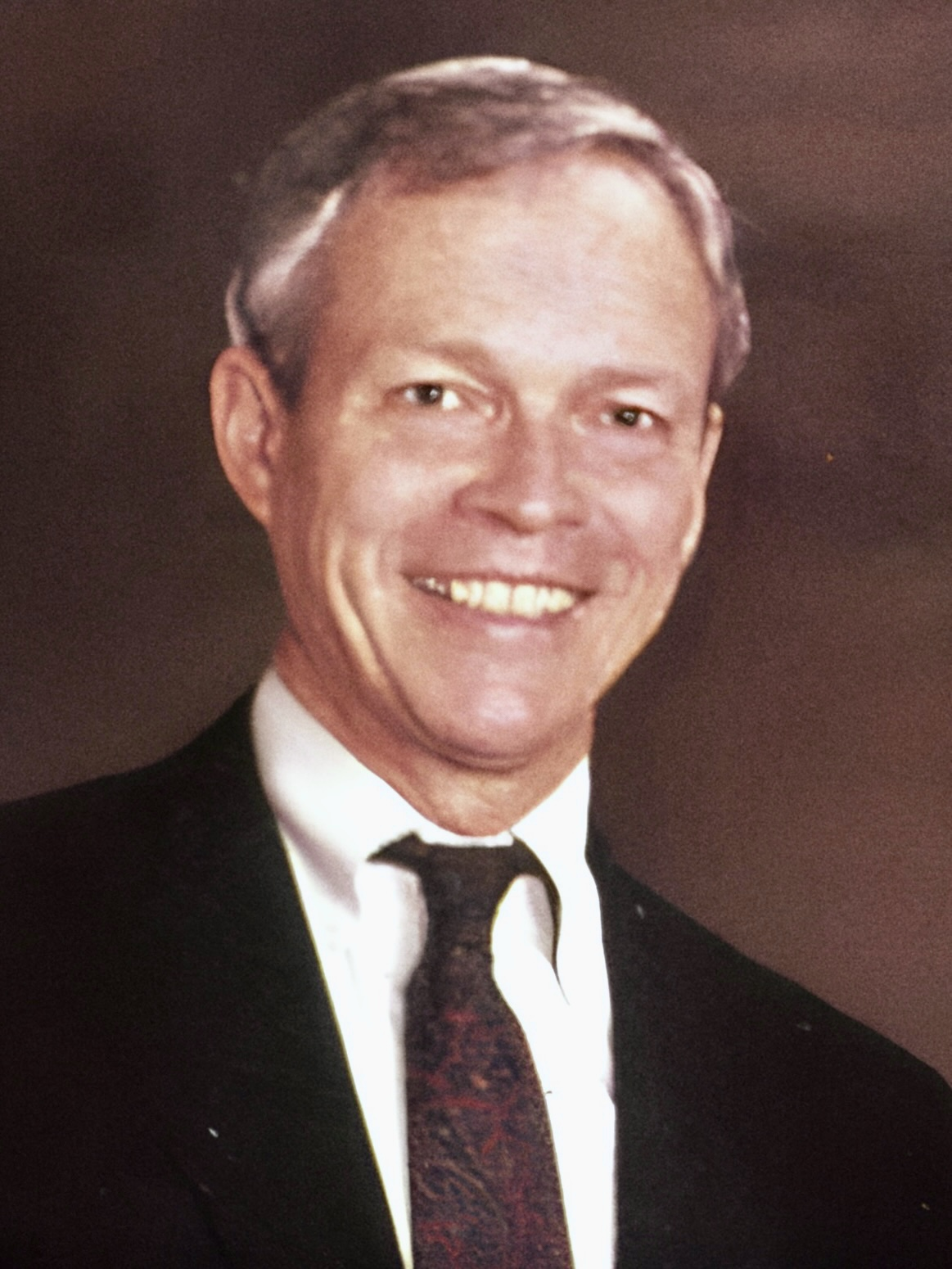
Buddy MacKay

- December 1
  - Mildred C. Crump, 86, politician, member of the Municipal Council of Newark (1994–1998, 2006–2021) (b. 1938)
  - Art Fryslie, 83, politician, member of the South Dakota House of Representatives (1999–2007) and Senate (2009–2013) (b. 1941)
  - Kelly Powers, 45, podiatric surgeon and television commentator (Fox News) (b. 1979)
  - David Prosser Jr., 81, jurist and politician, justice of the Wisconsin Supreme Court (1998–2016) and member of the Wisconsin State Assembly (1979–1997) (b. 1942)
- December 2
  - Sam Fox, 95, businessman and diplomat, ambassador to Belgium (2007–2009) (b. 1929)
  - Marie E. Howe, 85, politician, member of the Massachusetts House of Representatives (1965–1988) (b. 1939)
  - Paul Maslansky, 91, film producer and screenwriter (Police Academy, Return to Oz, Cop and a Half) (b. 1933)
  - Debbie Mathers, 69, author (My Son Marshall, My Son Eminem) (b. 1955)
  - David Nething, 91, politician, member of the North Dakota Senate (1966–2012) (b. 1933)
  - Don Ohl, 88, basketball player (Detroit Pistons, Baltimore Bullets, Atlanta Hawks) (b. 1936)
  - Willie Peete, 87, football coach (Green Bay Packers) (b. 1937)
  - Albert Robinson, 85, politician, member of the Kentucky House of Representatives (1972–1985, 1987–1989) and two-time member of the Kentucky Senate (b. 1938)
- December 3
  - Benjamin B. Blackburn, 97, politician, member of the U.S. House of Representatives (1967–1975).
  - John Stephen Cummins, 96, Roman Catholic prelate, auxiliary bishop of Sacramento (1974–1977) and bishop of Oakland (1977–2003) (b. 1928)
  - Dana Dimel, 62, college football player and coach (Wyoming Cowboys, Houston Cougars, UTEP Miners) (b. 1962)
  - William H. Perry III, 84, politician, member of the Missouri House of Representatives (1973–1975) (b. 1940)
  - Jan Scott-Frazier, 59, animator, producer and translator (b. 1965)
- December 4
  - Al Fitzmorris, 78, baseball player (Kansas City Royals) (b. 1946)
  - Joel Flaum, 88, jurist, judge of the U.S. Court of Appeals for the Seventh Circuit (since 1983) and the U.S. District Court for Northern Illinois (1974–1983) (b. 1936)
  - Donnie Gedling, 84, politician, member of the Kentucky House of Representatives (1984–1995) (b. 1939)
  - Yvonne Johnson, 82, politician, mayor of Greensboro, North Carolina (2007–2009) (b. 1942)
  - Hisham Kabbani, 79, Lebanese-born Islamic scholar (b. 1945)
  - Louis Nelson, 88, industrial designer and graphic artist (Korean War Veterans Memorial) (b. 1936)
  - Marshall Rutter, 93, lawyer and choral administrator (Los Angeles Master Chorale) (b. 1931)
  - Brian Thompson, 50, insurance executive, CEO of UnitedHealthcare (since 2021) (b. 1974)
- December 5
  - Dominique Brown, 34, American social media influencer (Disney), allergic reaction.
  - Thom Christopher, 84, actor (One Life to Live, Loving, Buck Rogers in the 25th Century) (b. 1940)
  - Rodney Jenkins, 80, equestrian (b. 1944)
  - Bill Melton, 79, baseball player (Chicago White Sox) (b. 1945)
  - Henry C. Mollett, 86, politician, member of the Iowa House of Representatives (1971–1973) (b. 1938)
  - Ron Rhine, 87, politician, member of the Ohio House of Representatives (2001–2003) (b. 1938)
  - David I. Steinberg, 96, historian (b. 1928)
  - Andy Stepp, 66, politician, member of the Mississippi House of Representatives (since 2024) (b. 1958)
- December 6
  - Angela Alvarez, 97, Cuban-born singer (b. 1927)
  - Ed Khayat, 89, football player (Washington Redskins, Philadelphia Eagles) and coach (Baltimore Colts) (b. 1935)
  - Steve Mensch, 62, business executive (Tyler Perry Studios) (b. 1962)
  - Elaine Smith, politician, member of the Idaho House of Representatives (2002–2020) (death announced on this date)
- December 7
  - Daniel Lubetkin, 93, lawyer and politician, member of the New Jersey General Assembly (1962–1964) (b. 1931)
  - Darrell McGraw, 88, jurist and politician, Attorney General of West Virginia (1993–2013) (b. 1936)
  - Merv Rettenmund, 81, baseball player (Baltimore Orioles) and coach (San Diego Padres) (b. 1943)
- December 8
  - Jack Hennessy, 73, politician, member of the Connecticut House of Representatives (2005–2023) (b. 1951) (death announced on this date)
  - Jill Jacobson, 70, actress (Nurse Sherri, Falcon Crest, The New Gidget) (b. 1954)
  - Luigi Manocchio, 97, mobster (Patriarca crime family) (b. 1927)
  - Bobby Morrison, 79, football coach (Michigan Wolverines) (b. 1945)
  - Clarke Reed, 96, politician (b. 1928)
  - Leonid Rudnytzky, 89, Ukrainian-born linguist (b. 1935)
- December 9
  - Nikki Giovanni, 81, poet, writer, activist and educator (b. 1943)
- December 10
  - Rocky Colavito, 91, baseball player (Cleveland Indians) (b. 1933)
  - Michael Cole, 84, actor (The Mod Squad, Nickel Mountain, It) (b. 1940)
  - Kreskin, 89, mentalist (b. 1935)
- December 11
  - David Bonderman, 82, businessman, co-founder of TPG Inc. (b. 1942)
  - Jim Leach, 82, politician, member of the U.S. House of Representatives (1977–2007) and Chair of the National Endowment for the Humanities (2009–2013) (b. 1942)
  - Pat McBride, 81, soccer player (St. Louis Stars, national team) (b. 1943)
- December 12
  - Ernie Beck, 93, basketball player (Philadelphia Warriors) (b. 1931)
  - Jim Tunney, 95, football official (b. 1929)
- December 13
  - Duane Acker, 93, academic, president of Kansas State University (1975–1986) (b. 1931)
  - Diane Delano, 67, actress (Northern Exposure, The Ladykillers, The Wicker Man) (b. 1957)
  - Carter Eckert, 78–79, historian (b. 1945) (death announced on this date)
  - Lemon Drop Kid, 28, Thoroughbred racehorse, winner of the 1999 Belmont Stakes (b. 1996)
  - Lorraine O'Grady, 90, artist, writer, translator and critic (b. 1934)
  - Kay Patterson, 93, politician, member of the South Carolina Senate (1985–2008) and House of Representatives (1975–1985) (b. 1931)
  - Orrin H. Pilkey, 90, marine geologist (b. 1934)
  - Jimmy Wilkerson, 43, football player (Kansas City Chiefs, Tampa Bay Buccaneers) (b. 1981)
- December 14
  - John Spratt, 82, politician, member of the U.S. House of Representatives (1983–2011) (b. 1942)
- December 15
  - Alexandra Zaharias, 95, ballet dancer (b. 1929)
- December 16
  - Anita Bryant, 84, singer and anti-gay activist (b. 1940)
  - Arlene Croce, 90, dance critic (The New Yorker), co-founder of Ballet Review (b. 1934)
  - Jean Jennings, 70, automobile journalist and editor (Car and Driver, Automobile) (b. 1954)
  - James E. Malone Jr., 67, politician, member of the Maryland House of Delegates (1995–2014) (b. 1957)
  - Dick Van Arsdale, 81, basketball player (New York Knicks, Phoenix Suns) (b. 1943)
- December 17
  - Alfa Anderson, 78, singer (Chic) (b. 1946)
  - Francis Bellotti, 101, politician, lieutenant governor (1963–1965) and attorney general of Massachusetts (1975–1987) (b. 1923)
  - Mike Brewer, 80, musician (Brewer & Shipley) and songwriter ("One Toke Over the Line") (b. 1944)
  - Rayful Edmond, 60, drug trafficker (b. 1964)
  - William Labov, 97, linguist (b. 1927)
  - David Mallett, 73, singer and songwriter ("Garden Song") (b. 1951)
- December 18
  - Joseph Corcoran, 49, convicted mass murderer (b. 1975)
  - Thomas R. DiLuglio, 93, politician, Rhode Island lieutenant governor (1977–1985) (b. 1931) (death announced on this date)
  - Slim Dunlap, 73, guitarist (The Replacements) (b. 1951)
  - Frank Kendrick, 74, basketball player (Purdue Boilermakers, Golden State Warriors) (b. 1950)
  - Fred Lorenzen, 89, Hall of Fame racing driver, Daytona 500 winner (1965) (b. 1934)
  - Friedrich St. Florian, 91, Austrian-born architect (World War II Memorial, Providence Place) (b. 1932)
- December 19
  - Stanley Booth, 82, music journalist (b. 1942)
  - Gwen Van Dam, 96, actress (Coming Home, Stir Crazy, True Confessions) (b. 1928)
  - Martha Keys, 94, politician, member of the U.S. House of Representatives (1975–1979) (b. 1930)
  - Barry N. Malzberg, 85, writer (The Falling Astronauts, Beyond Apollo, In the Stone House) and editor (b. 1939)
  - Ken Tschumper, 74, politician, member of the Minnesota House of Representatives (2007–2009) (b. 1950).
  - Uncle Mo, 16, Thoroughbred racehorse (b. 2008)
  - Kevin Ray Underwood, 45, convicted murderer (b. 1979)
  - Ralph Wayne, 92, politician, member of the Texas House of Representatives (1964–1972) (b. 1932)
  - Russ Weeks, 82, politician, member of the West Virginia Senate (2002–2006) (b. 1942)
  - Charles Young Jr., 62, politician, member of the Mississippi House of Representatives (since 2012) (b. 1962)
- December 20
  - Sugar Pie DeSanto, 89, singer (b. 1935)
  - John Erwin, 88, voice actor (The Archie Show, Sabrina the Teenage Witch, He-Man and the Masters of the Universe) (b. 1936)
  - Rickey Henderson, 65, Hall of Fame baseball player (Oakland Athletics, New York Yankees, San Diego Padres), World Series champion (1989, 1993) (b. 1958)
  - George Zebrowski, 78, Austrian-born science fiction writer (Macrolife, The Killing Star, Nebula Awards 20) (b. 1945)
- December 21
  - Casey Chaos, 59, singer (Amen, Christian Death) (b. 1965)
  - Art Evans, 82, actor (A Soldier's Story, Fright Night, Die Hard 2) (b. 1942)
  - Hudson Meek, 16, actor (90 Minutes in Heaven, MacGyver, Baby Driver) (b. 2008)
  - Terry Ree, 75, comedian (Williams and Ree) (b. 1949)
- December 22
  - Geoffrey Deuel, 81, actor (Chisum, Terminal Island, The Young and the Restless) (b. 1943)
  - David B. Douzanis, 74, politician, member of the New Hampshire House of Representatives (1974–1976) (b. 1950)
  - Vincent Fort, 68, politician, member of the Georgia State Senate (1996–2017) (b. 1956)
  - Stuart A. Rice, 92, theoretical and physical chemist (b. 1932)
  - Alan Senauke, 77, Sōtō Zen priest, folk musician, and poet (b. 1947)
- December 23
  - Gary Cohn, 72, investigative reporter and academic (b. 1952)
  - Timothy Cullen, 80, politician, member of the Wisconsin Senate (1975–1987, 2011–2015) (b. 1944)
  - Thomas Gaither, 86, botanist and civil rights activist (Friendship Nine) (b. 1938)
  - Victor Parsonnet, 100, cardiac surgeon (b. 1924)
  - Sylvia H. Rambo, 88, jurist, judge of the U.S. District Court for Middle Pennsylvania (1979–2024) (b. 1936)
  - Mel Shapiro, 89, theater director (b. 1935)
- December 24
  - Curtis Cheek, 66, bridge player (b. 1958)
  - Richard Perry, 82, record producer ("You're So Vain", "I'm So Excited", "Tiptoe Through the Tulips") (b. 1942)
  - George Petak, 75, politician, member of the Wisconsin Senate (1991–1996) (b. 1949)
- December 25
  - Bill Bergey, 79, Hall of Fame football player (Cincinnati Bengals, Philadelphia Eagles) (b. 1945)
  - Jax Dane, 48, professional wrestler (NWA, ROH) (b. 1976)
  - Mary Murphy, 85, politician, member of the Minnesota House of Representatives (1977–2023) (b. 1939)
  - Brady Paxton, 77, politician, member of the West Virginia House of Delegates (1993–1995, 1999–2014) (b. 1947)
- December 26
  - Sammy Thurman Brackenbury, 91, Hall of Fame barrel racer (b. 1933)
  - Dick Capri, 93, actor (They Still Call Me Bruce) and comedian (b. 1931)
  - John B. Cobb, 99, environmentalist and theologian (b. 1925)
  - OG Maco, 32, rapper ("U Guessed It", "Doctor Pepper") (b. 1992)
  - Richard Parsons, 76, financial and media executive (CBS, Time Warner), chairman of Citigroup (2009–2012) (b. 1948)
  - Sammy Thurman Brackenbury, 91, Hall of Fame barrel racer (b. 1933) (death announced on this date)
- December 27
  - Paul Bamba, 35, professional boxer (b. 1989)
  - Richard F. Colburn, 74, politician, member of the Maryland Senate (1995–2015) and House of Delegates (1983–1991) (b. 1950)
  - Kari Dziedzic, 62, politician, member of the Minnesota Senate (since 2012) (b. 1962)
  - Greg Gumbel, 78, sportscaster (CBS Sports, NFL) (b. 1946)
  - Charlie Maxwell, 97, baseball player (Boston Red Sox, Detroit Tigers, Chicago White Sox) (b. 1927)
  - David B. Rivkin, 68, attorney and conservative commentator (b. 1956)
  - Charles Shyer, 83, film director, producer and screenwriter (Private Benjamin, Baby Boom, Father of the Bride) (b. 1941)
- December 28
  - Charles Dolan, 98, businessman, founder of Cablevision and HBO (b. 1926)
  - Leonard Lilyholm, 83, ice hockey player (Minnesota Fighting Saints) (b. 1941)
  - Barre Phillips, 90, jazz musician (b. 1934)
  - Herbert R. Temple Jr., 96, military officer (b. 1928)
  - Virgil Wood, 93, civil rights activist (b. 1931)
- December 29
  - Aaron Brown, 76, broadcaster (ABC, CNN) (b. 1948)
  - Eric Carlson, 66, heavy metal guitarist (Mentors) (b. 1958)
  - Jimmy Carter, 100, politician, president (1977–1981), governor of Georgia (1971–1975), Nobel Peace Prize laureate (2002) (b. 1924)
  - George Folsey Jr., 85, film producer and editor (Animal House, The Blues Brothers, Twilight Zone: The Movie) (b. 1939)
  - Linda Lavin, 87, actress (Alice) and singer, Tony winner (1987) (b. 1937)
  - Phil Lang, 95, politician, member of the Oregon House of Representatives (1961–1979) (b. 1929)
  - Lenny Randle, 75, baseball player (Texas Rangers, Seattle Mariners, New York Mets) (b. 1949)
  - Warcloud, 53, rapper (Black Knights) (b. 1971)
- December 30
  - Mike Babul, 47, basketball coach (b. 1977)
  - John Capodice, 83, actor (Wall Street, Speed, Independence Day) (b. 1941)
  - Loretta Di Franco, 82, soprano (b. 1942) (death announced on this date)
  - Sir Fraser Stoddart, 82, British-born chemist, Nobel Prize laureate (2016) (b. 1942)
  - Ronald A. Wait, 80, politician, member of the Illinois House of Representatives (1983–1993, 1995–2011) (b. 1944)
- December 31
  - Tom Johnson, 85, composer (b. 1939)
  - Buddy MacKay, 91, politician and diplomat, governor of Florida (1998–1999) (b. 1933)
  - Don Nix, 83, singer-songwriter and multi-instrumentalist (The Mar-Keys) (b. 1941)
