= Deaths in December 2024 =

The following is a list of notable deaths in December 2024.

Entries for each day are listed alphabetically by surname. A typical entry lists information in the following sequence:

- Name, age, country of citizenship at birth, subsequent country of citizenship (if applicable), reason for notability, cause of death (if known), and reference.

== December 2024 ==
=== 1 ===
- Fahad Ag Almahmoud, Malian Tuareg militant, secretary-general of GATIA (2014–2023), airstrike.
- Vinci Vogue Anžlovar, 61, Slovene film director, complications from amyotrophic lateral sclerosis.
- Niels Arestrup, 75, French actor (The Beat That My Heart Skipped, A Prophet, War Horse).
- Jacques Barsamian, 81, French singer, writer, and journalist.
- Alioune Badara Bèye, 79, Senegalese novelist, playwright and publisher.
- Gjorgji Bojadžiev, 74, Macedonian army officer, chief of the general staff (2004–2005).
- Sir Richard Carew Pole, 13th Baronet, 85, British aristocrat.
- Mildred C. Crump, 86, American politician, member of the Municipal Council of Newark (1994–1998, 2006–2021).
- Crescenzo D'Amore, 45, Italian road racing cyclist, traffic collision.
- Art Fryslie, 83, American politician, member of the South Dakota House of Representatives (1999–2007) and Senate (2009–2013).
- Syed Ali Hassan Gilani, 50, Pakistani politician, MNA (2014–2018), traffic collision.
- Jane Gray, 92–93, British stained glass artist.
- David Griffith, 88, Welsh Anglican priest.
- Terry Griffiths, 77, Welsh snooker player, world champion (1979), complications from dementia.
- Padre Irala, 88, Paraguayan-Brazilian Jesuit priest.
- Fred Jüssi, 89, Estonian biologist, nature writer and photographer.
- Rogério Cezar de Cerqueira Leite, 93, Brazilian physicist and engineer.
- Raj Manchanda, 79, Indian squash player.
- Christa Meier, 82, German politician, member of the Landtag of Bavaria (1978–1990), mayor of Regensburg (1990–1996).
- Khalil Ahmad Mukhlis, 68, Pakistani politician, MP (2002–2007), cardiac arrest.
- Helmut Münch, 85, German politician, member of the Landtag of Saxony (1990–2004).
- Toshifumi Nakamura, 85, Japanese politician, mayor of Hachinohe (2001–2005).
- Jacques Panciatici, 76, French rally driver.
- Kelly Powers, 45, American podiatric surgeon and television commentator (Fox News), glioblastoma.
- David Prosser Jr., 81, American jurist and politician, justice of the Wisconsin Supreme Court (1998–2016), member of the Wisconsin State Assembly (1979–1997), cancer.
- Ian Redpath, 83, Australian cricketer (Victoria, national team).
- Sandra Reyes, 49, Colombian actress (La Mujer del Presidente, Pedro el escamoso, El cartel), breast cancer.
- Craig Rich, 86, British broadcaster and meteorologist.
- Clive Robertson, 78, Australian radio and television personality.
- Rosalie Wilkins, Baroness Wilkins, 78, British politician, member of the House of Lords (1999–2015).
- Martin Wimbush, 75, English actor (Helping Henry, Mean Machine, The Iron Lady), complications from motor neuron disease.
- Ilke Wyludda, 55, German discus thrower, Olympic champion (1996).
- Kais al-Zubaidi, 85, Iraqi film director (The Visit).

=== 2 ===
- Ömer Barutçu, 82, Turkish politician, minister of transport (1996–1997) and MP (1977–1980, 1987–2002).
- Jacques le Berré, 87, French Olympic judoka (1964).
- Ed Botterell, 93, Canadian Olympic sailor (1964).
- Lucjan Brychczy, 90, Polish football player (Legia Warsaw, national team) and manager (Legia Warsaw).
- Swadesh Chakraborty, 80, Indian politician, MP (1999–2009).
- Louise Cotnoir, 75, Canadian writer.
- Perry J. Dahl, 101, Canadian-born American air force colonel and World War II flying ace.
- Helmut Duckadam, 65, Romanian footballer (UTA Arad, Steaua București, national team).
- Sam Fox, 95, American businessman and diplomat, ambassador to Belgium (2007–2009).
- Neale Fraser, 91, Australian Hall of Fame tennis player, seven-time Davis Cup winner.
- Paul van Gelder, 77, Dutch radio disc jockey.
- Héctor Gutiérrez Pabón, 87, Colombian Roman Catholic prelate, auxiliary bishop of Cali (1987–1998), bishop of Chiquinquirá (1998–2003) and of Engativá (2003–2015).
- Marie E. Howe, 85, American politician, member of the Massachusetts House of Representatives (1965–1988).
- Harald Hudak, 67, German middle-distance runner.
- John Hunting, 89, English football referee.
- Heikki Koski, 84, Finnish civil servant and politician, minister of the interior (1975), governor of Western Finland (1997–2003).
- Yevgeni Kryukov, 61, Russian football player (Kuzbass Kemerovo, Rostselmash Rostov-on-Don, Zhemchuzhina-Sochi) and manager.
- Marvin Laird, 85, American composer and conductor.
- Eli Lancman, 88, Israeli historian.
- Liu Chia-chang, Taiwanese songwriter ("Ode to the Republic of China", "The Plum Blossom"), cancer.
- Paul Maslansky, 91, American film producer (Police Academy, Return to Oz, Ski Patrol).
- David Nething, 91, American politician, member of the North Dakota Senate (1966–2012).
- Marlos Nobre, 85, Brazilian composer.
- Don Ohl, 88, American basketball player (Detroit Pistons, Baltimore Bullets, Atlanta Hawks).
- José Pinto Paiva, 86, Brazilian chess player.
- Albert Robinson, 85, American politician, member of the Kentucky Senate (1994–2005, 2013–2021), two-time member of the Kentucky House of Representatives.
- Michael Ruetz, 84, German artist, photographer and author.
- Monica Rutherford, 80, British Olympic gymnast (1964).
- Giovanni Sabbatucci, 80, Italian journalist and historian.
- Choudhary Piara Singh, Indian politician, Jammu and Kashmir MLA (1996–2002).

=== 3 ===
- Michael Alpers, 90, Australian medical researcher.
- Tengiz Beridze, 85, Georgian academic and biochemist.
- Ivor Bird, 80, Antiguan high jumper and broadcasting executive.
- Benjamin B. Blackburn, 97, American politician, member of the U.S. House of Representatives (1967–1975).
- Jan Bloukaas, 25, South African singer, brain cancer.
- Henri Borlant, 97, French doctor, writer, and Holocaust survivor.
- Denis Brihat, 96, French photographer.
- René Burkhalter, 90, Swiss Olympic official, president of the Swiss Olympic Association (1997–2001).
- Aileen H. Cowan, 98, Canadian painter and sculptor.
- John Stephen Cummins, 96, American Roman Catholic prelate, auxiliary bishop of Sacramento (1974–1977) and bishop of Oakland (1977–2003).
- Wally Dempsey, 80, American professional football player (Saskatchewan Roughriders, BC Lions).
- Dana Dimel, 62, American college football player and coach (Wyoming Cowboys, Houston Cougars, UTEP Miners).
- Philip Hacking, 93, English Anglican priest.
- Frederick Henry, 81, Canadian Roman Catholic prelate, auxiliary bishop of London (1986–1995), bishop of Thunder Bay (1995–1998) and of Calgary (1998–2017).
- Huang Zhun, 98, Chinese composer.
- Adam Hunt, 44, American chess player, cancer.
- Ali Krasniqi, 71–72, Kosovar Roma writer and activist.
- Beatriz Larrotcha Palma, 65, Spanish diplomat, under-secretary of foreign affairs (2017–2018).
- Malcolm Le Grice, 84, British painter, filmmaker and photographer.
- Hans van Leeuwen, 92, Dutch physicist.
- Minny Luimstra-Albeda, 89, Dutch politician, senator (1992–1999).
- Yastur-ul-Haq Malik, 92, Pakistani admiral, chief of the Naval Staff (1988–1991).
- Jon McLachlan, 75, New Zealand rugby union player (Auckland, national team).
- Yuvanraj Nethrun, 45, Indian actor (Ponni, Mannan Magal, Mahalakshmi).
- Ecaterina Oancia, 70, Romanian rower, Olympic champion (1984) and silver medallist (1988).
- William H. Perry III, 84, American politician, member of the Missouri House of Representatives (1973–1975).
- David Ratcliff, 87, British Anglican priest.
- Jan Scott-Frazier, 59, American translator and anime producer.
- Tan Howe Liang, 91, Singaporean weightlifter, Olympic silver medallist (1960).
- Israel Vázquez, 46, Mexican super bantamweight boxer, IBF champion and twice WBC champion, sarcoma.
- Mohamed Ali Yusuf, 80, Somali politician, vice president of Puntland (2004–2005) and speaker of the Senate (2021–2022).
- Mustapha Zaari, 79, Moroccan actor (The Hyena's Sun, Chroniques blanches), prostate cancer.

=== 4 ===
- Ruth Kleppe Aakvaag, 86, Norwegian politician, MP (1989–1990).
- Princess Birgitta of Sweden, 87, Swedish royal, fall.
- Eugenio Borgna, 94, Italian psychiatrist and essayist.
- Francis Caballero, 84, French lawyer and academic.
- M. R. Chandrasekharan, 95, Indian literary critic and author.
- Chiung Yao, 86, Taiwanese novelist (Fire and Rain, Wan-chun's Three Loves), suicide.
- Kamran Hossain Chowdhury, 72, Bangladeshi politician, MP (1988–1990), heart disease.
- Joseph Corozzo, 83, American mobster.
- John Docherty, 84, Scottish football player (Brentford) and manager (Millwall, Cambridge United).
- Guillermo Ferraro, 69, Argentine accountant and politician, minister of infrastructure (2023–2024).
- Al Fitzmorris, 78, American baseball player (Kansas City Royals).
- Joel Flaum, 88, American jurist, judge of the U.S. Court of Appeals for the Seventh Circuit (since 1983) and the U.S. District Court for Northern Illinois (1974–1983).
- Donnie Gedling, 84, American politician, member of the Kentucky House of Representatives (1984–1995).
- Merrily Harpur, 76, British-Irish cartoonist.
- Roly Horrey, 81, English footballer (York City, Cambridge United, Blackburn Rovers).
- Yvonne Johnson, 82, American politician, mayor of Greensboro, North Carolina (2007–2009).
- Hisham Kabbani, 79, Lebanese-American Islamic scholar.
- Lucien Kassi-Kouadio, 61, Ivorian footballer (Montceau, Cannes, national team).
- Dante Mircoli, 77, Italian-Argentine football player (Independiente, Estudiantes de La Plata, Sampdoria) and manager.
- Louis Nelson, 88, American industrial designer and graphic artist (Korean War Veterans Memorial), cancer.
- Rafael Nieto Navia, 86, Colombian diplomat and political scientist, president of the Inter-American Court of Human Rights (1987–1989).
- Seiichi Ota, 79, Japanese politician, MP (1980–2003, 2005–2009) and minister of agriculture (2008).
- Rafał Piotrowski, 50, Polish footballer (Pogoń Szczecin, Stal Mielec).
- Péter Rózsás, 81, Hungarian table tennis player.
- Marshall Rutter, 93, American lawyer and choral administrator (Los Angeles Master Chorale).
- Ambroise Sarr, 73, Senegalese four-time Olympic wrestler.
- Rachmadi Bambang Sumadhijo, 84, Indonesian engineer and bureaucrat.
- Gilberto Mendonça Teles, 93, Brazilian writer and literary critic.
- Brian Thompson, 50, American insurance executive, CEO of UnitedHealthcare (since 2021), shot.
- Trần Anh Khoa, 33, Vietnamese footballer (SHB Da Nang), suicide.
- Jean-Didier Vincent, 89, French neuropsychiatrist, member of the French Academy of Sciences.
- Christopher Wright, 70, British composer, pneumonia.
- César Yanes Urías, 104, Salvadoran naval officer and politician, member of the Junta of Government (1960–1961).
- Tony Young, 71, English footballer (Manchester United, Charlton Athletic, York City).

=== 5 ===
- Wanda Adamska, 80, Polish politician, MP (1980–1985).
- Robert P. Black, 96, American economist, president of the Federal Reserve Bank of Richmond (1973–1992).
- Christel Bodenstein, 86, German actress (The Captain from Cologne, The Singing Ringing Tree, Viel Lärm um nichts).
- Dominique Brown, 34, American social media influencer (The Walt Disney Company), allergic reaction.
- Barbora Bühnová, 43, Czech computer scientist.
- Martin Chevallaz, 76, Swiss military officer and politician, member of the Grand Council of Vaud (2002–2005).
- Thom Christopher, 84, American actor (One Life to Live, Loving, Buck Rogers in the 25th Century).
- Cyril Dunne, 83, Irish Gaelic footballer (Galway).
- Frederik Finisie, 67, Surinamese politician, MP (1996–2018).
- Carol Goldwasser, 67, American casting director (Hannah Montana, Austin & Ally, American Dad!), complications following surgery.
- Gongbu, 91, Chinese mountaineer.
- Bob Hainlen, 97, American football player (Wilmington Clippers).
- Rodney Jenkins, 80, American Hall of Fame equestrian.
- Hiroshi Kagawa, 99, Japanese Hall of Fame footballer and journalist (Sankei Sports).
- Julia Levy, 90, Canadian microbiologist and immunologist.
- Jean-Luc Maxence, 78, French poet, publisher, and writer.
- Canaan Mdletshe, 47, South African politician, MP (2024), traffic collision.
- Bill Melton, 79, American baseball player (Chicago White Sox).
- Henry C. Mollett, 86, American politician, member of the Iowa House of Representatives (1971–1973).
- Marthe Katrine Myhre, 39, Norwegian long-distance runner.
- Radovan Pankov, 77–78, Serbian politician, minister of the diaspora (1994–1998).
- Paolo Pillitteri, 84, Italian politician, deputy (1983–1987, 1992–1994) and mayor of Milan (1986–1992).
- Ron Rhine, 87, American politician, member of the Ohio House of Representatives (2001–2003).
- Jacques Roubaud, 92, French poet, writer, and mathematician.
- David Schweizer, 74, American theatre director.
- István Stefanov, 60, Hungarian footballer (Csepel SC, Budapest Honvéd, Békéscsaba).
- David I. Steinberg, 96, American historian.
- Andy Stepp, 66, American politician, member of the Mississippi House of Representatives (since 2024).
- Julie Stevens, 87, English actress (The Avengers, Carry On Cleo), singer and television presenter (Play School), complications from Parkinson's disease.
- Mario Tessuto, 81, Italian singer ("Lisa dagli occhi blu").
- Trần Hanh, 92, Vietnamese air force pilot and military officer.
- Vincenzo Trantino, 90, Italian lawyer and politician, deputy (1972–2006).
- Evgeny Velikhov, 89, Russian physicist, member of the Russian Academy of Sciences.
- John Williams, 78, South African rugby union player (Northern Transvaal, national team) and coach, leukemia.

=== 6 ===
- Abu Zafar, 81, Bangladeshi lyricist and musician.
- Ángela Álvarez, 97, Cuban-born American singer.
- Muyideen Ajani Bello, 84, Nigerian Islamic scholar.
- Andrew Boylan, 85, Irish politician, TD (1987–2002).
- Ronald Brown, 89, English mathematician.
- Jennifer Croxton, 80, British actress (The Avengers, Our Miss Fred, I, Claudius).
- Vitaliy Dyrdyra, 86, Ukrainian sailor, Olympic champion (1972).
- Michel Fardeau, 95, French pathologist, myologist, and researcher.
- Roger Gerber, 90, French Olympic weightlifter.
- Jayabharathi, 77, Indian film director (Kudisai, Rendum Rendum Anju, Kurukshetram).
- Jean Keyrouz, 92–93, Lebanese Olympic alpine skier (1956, 1964).
- Ed Khayat, 89, American football player (Washington Redskins, Philadelphia Eagles) and coach (Baltimore Colts).
- Theo van de Klundert, 88, Dutch economist.
- John McDermid, 84, Canadian politician, MP (1979–1993), euthanasia.
- Thomas R. Morgan, 94, American general, assistant commandant of the Marine Corps (1986–1988).
- Phelekezela Mphoko, 84, Zimbabwean diplomat and politician, second vice-president (2014–2017) and acting president (2017).
- Miho Nakayama, 54, Japanese singer ("C", "You're My Only Shinin' Star") and actress (Love Letter).
- Madhukar Pichad, 83, Indian politician, Maharashtra MLA (1980–2014).
- Jean-Pierre Rioux, 85, French historian.
- Dickie Rock, 88, Irish singer ("Come Back to Stay") and musician (The Miami Showband).
- Harshandeep Singh, 20, Indian student, shot.
- Elaine Smith, 78, American politician, member of the Idaho House of Representatives (2002–2020).
- Michel Steininger, 89, Swiss Olympic fencer.
- Maggie Tabberer, 87, Australian model and television personality.
- Graham Tainton, 97, South African-born Swedish dancer and choreographer (ABBA).
- Stanisław Tym, 87, Polish actor (The Cruise), comedian and journalist (Wprost, Polityka).

=== 7 ===
- Yevgeni Aleinikov, 57, Russian sport shooter, Olympic bronze medalist (2000).
- Hamida Banu, 64, Indian sprinter.
- Dmitry Buchkin, 97, Russian painter.
- Tyrus W. Cobb, 84, American national security scholar, member of the National Security Council (1983–1989).
- Víctor Amador De Martino, 81, Argentine politician, deputy (1989–1993).
- Jack DiLauro, 81, American baseball player (New York Mets, Houston Astros).
- Raymond L. Garthoff, 95, American politician.
- Sherwood Gorbach, 90, American academic.
- Gordon Graydon, 82, Canadian politician, Alberta MLA (2001–2008), mayor of Grande Prairie (1992–2001).
- Dana Herrmannová, 93, Slovak television presenter.
- Jim Leedman, 86, Australian politician, member of the Australian Capital Territory House of Assembly (1974–1986).
- Daniel Lubetkin, 93, American lawyer and politician, member of the New Jersey General Assembly (1962–1964).
- Darrell McGraw, 88, American jurist and politician, justice of the Supreme Court of Appeals of West Virginia (1977–1988), West Virginia attorney general (1993–2013), heart attack.
- Vilma Nugis, 66, Estonian Paralympic skier (1994).
- Merv Rettenmund, 81, American baseball player (Baltimore Orioles, California Angels) and coach (San Diego Padres).
- Orlando Rossardi, 86, Cuban poet, playwright, and researcher.
- Kushang Sherpa, 59, Indian Sherpa mountaineer.
- Steady Bongo, 58, Sierra Leonean musician and record producer, traffic collision.
- Clifford Surko, 83, American physicist.
- Temple Tucker, 88, American basketball player.
- Doychin Vasilev, 80, Bulgarian mountaineer and cinematographer.
- Iosif Vitebskiy, 86, Ukrainian fencer, Olympic silver medalist (1968).
- Alan Young, 69, Canadian lawyer.

=== 8 ===
- Gérard Bessière, 96, French diarist, poet and priest.
- Anne Hessing Cahn, c. 94, German-born American political author and arms control expert.
- Alain Fuchs, 71, Swiss-born French chemist and academic, president of the Paris Sciences et Lettres University (2017–2024).
- Michael Gill, 67, New Zealand cricketer (Central Districts).
- Roberto Gómez, 35, Dominican baseball player (San Francisco Giants), traffic collision.
- Şerif Gören, 80, Turkish film director (Umut, Yol), complications from a fall.
- Dick Grecni, 86, American football player (Minnesota Vikings, Edmonton Eskimos).
- Alastair Hannay, 92, British-born Norwegian philosopher and academic.
- Jack Hennessy, 73, American politician, member of the Connecticut House of Representatives (2005–2023).
- Yude Henteleff, 97, Canadian lawyer and human rights activist.
- Arild Hiim, 79, Norwegian politician, MP (1989–1997).
- Douglas I. Hunt, 87, American football coach (Weber State) and politician, member of the Utah House of Representatives (1975–1977).
- Jill Jacobson, 70, American actress (Falcon Crest, Days of Our Lives, Newhart).
- Larysa Jaye, 40, American singer, traffic collision.
- Jean Khamsé Vithavong, 82, Laotian Roman Catholic prelate, vicar apostolic coadjutor (1982–1984) and vicar apostolic (1984–2017) of Vientiane.
- Tony Lloyd, Baron Lloyd of Berwick, 95, British jurist, lord of appeal in ordinary (1993–1998), member of the House of Lords (1993–2015).
- Ihab Makhlouf, 51, Syrian mobile phone industry executive (Syriatel), shot.
- Luigi Manocchio, 97, American mobster (Patriarca crime family).
- Jelena Mašínová, 83, Czech screenwriter.
- Bobby Morrison, 79, American football coach (Michigan Wolverines).
- Erwin Nypels, 91, Dutch politician, MP (1967–1973, 1974–1982, 1982–1989).
- Emerson Pugh, 95, American research engineer and scientist, president of IEEE (1989).
- M. D. R. Ramachandran, 90, Indian politician, chief minister of Puducherry (1980–1983, 1990–1991) and speaker of the Puducherry Legislative Assembly (2001–2006).
- Clarke Reed, 96, American politician and businessman, complications from pneumonia.
- Leonid Rudnytzky, 89, Polish-born Ukrainian-American linguist.
- Nikos Sarganis, 70, Greek footballer (Olympiacos, Panathinaikos, national team), cancer.
- Manorama Singh, 86, Indian politician, MP (1984–1985, 1986–1989).
- Robert Smith, 78, New Zealand cricketer (Wellington).
- Witthaya Thienthong, 83, Thai politician, MP (1983–2005), senator (2006).
- Tom Voyce, 43, English rugby union player (Bath, Wasps, national team), drowned.
- André Zysberg, 77, French historian and academic.

=== 9 ===
- Sanjit Acharya, 71, Bangladeshi singer, songwriter and playwright.
- Benito Aguas Atlahua, 45, Mexican politician, deputy (since 2024), shot.
- Will Arnott, 25, British Paralympic boccia player (2024).
- Elisheva Barak-Ussoskin, 88, Israeli jurist, judge (1995–2006) and vice president (2000–2006) of the National Labor Court.
- Jack Behrens, 89, American-Canadian composer.
- Júlio Costamilan, 90, Brazilian lawyer and politician, deputy (1979–1991), member of the Constituent Assembly (1987–1988).
- Terry Davis, 86, British politician, MP (1971–1974, 1979–2004).
- Friedhelm Farthmann, 94, German politician, MP (1971–1976), member of the Landtag of North Rhine-Westphalia (1980–1995, 1995–2000).
- Melissa Freeman, 98, American physician.
- Nikki Giovanni, 81, American poet, author (Rosa) and professor, complications from lung cancer.
- Jody Gormley, 53, Irish Gaelic footballer (Tyrone, London) and manager, liver cancer.
- Riley Gunnels, 87, American football player (Philadelphia Eagles, Pittsburgh Steelers).
- Mazen al-Hamada, 47, Syrian human rights activist. (body discovered on this date)
- Fritz Hari, 96, Swiss politician, MP (1979–1995).
- Gerd Heidemann, 93, German journalist (Stern).
- William J. Hennessy Jr., 67, American court sketch artist.
- Thomas Hertel, 73, German composer.
- Uwe Hollweg, 87, German politician, member of the Bürgerschaft of Bremen (1975–1979, 1983–1991).
- Sachio Kuwae, 68, Japanese politician, mayor of Okinawa (since 2014), complications from myelodysplastic syndrome.
- Roger Madec, 74, French politician, senator (2004–2017).
- L. Sandy Maisel, 79, American political scientist, intestinal cancer.
- Zach McIlwain, 38, American staff sergeant and veterans advocate.
- Sir David McMurtry, 84, Irish metrology industrialist, co-founder of Renishaw plc.
- Joel Mendes, 78, Brazilian footballer (Santos, Bahia, Santa Cruz), stroke.
- Gérard-Raymond Morin, 84, Canadian politician, Quebec MNA (1989–1998).
- Terry Nicoll, 91, Australian Olympic modern pentathlete (1956).
- Héctor Recalde, 86, Argentine politician, deputy (2005–2017).
- Claude Riveline, 88, French economist and academic.
- Alastair Salvesen, 83, Scottish businessman.
- Axel Schmidt, 83, German oboist.
- Robert Sténuit, 91, Belgian journalist, writer and underwater archaeologist.
- Dalton Trevisan, 99, Brazilian writer, Camões Prize winner (2012).
- Ruut Veenhoven, 82, Dutch sociologist.
- Arnold Yarrow, 104, British actor (Doctor Who, EastEnders, Son of the Pink Panther), screenwriter and novelist.

=== 10 ===
- Always Dreaming, 10, American Thoroughbred racehorse, winner of the 2017 Kentucky Derby, colic.
- Madeleine Arbour, 101, Canadian designer, painter, and journalist.
- Josy Arens, 72, Belgian politician, three-time deputy, member of the Parliament of Wallonia (2014–2019), mayor of Attert (since 1995).
- Barry Ashworth, 82, English footballer (Chester).
- Donald Bitzer, 90, American Hall of Fame electrical engineer, co-inventor of the plasma display.
- Rocky Colavito, 91, American baseball player (Cleveland Indians), complications from diabetes.
- Michael Cole, 84, American actor (The Mod Squad, General Hospital, It).
- Lennie De Ice, 54, British musician ("We Are I.E.").
- Felix Feng, 48, American physician and scientist, cancer.
- Mario Fernández Pelaz, 81, Spanish lawyer and politician, deputy lehendakari (1982–1985) and member of the Basque Parliament (1984–1986).
- Thomas W. Hawkins Jr., 86, American mathematician.
- Mahieddine Khalef, 80, Algerian football player (JS Kabylie) and manager (JS Kabylie, national team).
- J. Max Kilpatrick, 79, American politician, member of the Mississippi House of Representatives (1972–1980).
- The Amazing Kreskin, 89, American mentalist, complications from dementia.
- S. M. Krishna, 92, Indian politician, minister of external affairs (2009–2012), governor of Maharashtra (2004–2008), and chief minister of Karnataka (1999–2004).
- Morgan Llewellyn, 87, British army officer, general officer commanding Wales (1987–1990), cancer.
- Gary Merrington, 78, Australian footballer (Footscray).
- José Antonio Naya, 90, Spanish football manager (Burgos, Real Murcia, Real Burgos). (death announced on this date)
- Kenneth Nkhwa, 97, Motswana politician, MP (1965–1989).
- Raghnall Ó Floinn, Irish art historian, director of the National Museum of Ireland (2013–2018).
- Katharyn Powers, 71, American playwright.
- Claus Raidl, 82, Austrian banker, president of the Austrian National Bank (2008–2018).
- Serhiy Ralyuchenko, 62, Ukrainian football player (Zirka Kirovohrad, Metalist Kharkiv, SKA Kyiv) and manager.
- Herb Robertson, 73, American jazz trumpeter and flugelhornist.
- María Socas, 65, Argentine actress (The Warrior and the Sorceress, Wizards of the Lost Kingdom, Deathstalker II).
- Brenda Walker, 67, Australian author (The Wing of Night), traffic collision.
- Thomas E. White, 80, American businessman and army general, Secretary of the Army (2001–2003), complications from Lewy body dementia.
- Lode Wils, 95, Belgian historian and academic.
- Yu Jianhua, 62–63, Chinese politician and diplomat, head of the General Administration of Customs (since 2022).

=== 11 ===
- Corinne Allal, 69, Tunisian-born Israeli rock musician and music producer, pancreatic cancer.
- Robert Amundson, 86, American judge, justice of the South Dakota Supreme Court (1991–2002).
- Hannes Androsch, 86, Austrian businessman, consultant, and politician, vice-chancellor (1976–1981) and minister of finance (1970–1981).
- Kostas Batuvas, 90, Greek politician, MP (1974–1981, 1985–2000), minister of transport and communication (1986–1988).
- David Bonderman, 82, American businessman (TPG Inc.).
- Ethel Caffie-Austin, 75, American gospel singer.
- Sandrino Castec, 64, Chilean footballer (Universidad de Chile, Audax Italiano, national team), complications from septic shock.
- Hugh Cornish, 90, Australian television personality.
- Ranmal Singh Dorwal, 101, Indian politician, Rajasthan MLA (1977–1980).
- Alex Edwards, 78, Scottish footballer (Dunfermline Athletic, Hibernian).
- Bob Fernandez, 100, American veteran (Pearl Harbor).
- Marguerite Frank, 97, French-born American mathematician.
- Khalil Haqqani, 58, Afghan politician, minister for refugees and repatriation (since 2021), bombing.
- Syd Hynes, 80, English rugby league player and coach (Leeds Rhinos).
- Diether Kunerth, 84, German contemporary artist.
- Jim Leach, 82, American politician, member of the U.S. House of Representatives (1977–2007), chair of the National Endowment for the Humanities (2009–2013), complications from a heart attack and stroke.
- António Loja, 90, Portuguese politician and teacher, MP (1976–1979) and Madeira MLA (1980–1984).
- Michio Mamiya, 95, Japanese composer, pneumonia.
- Troy Masters, 63, American journalist (Gay City News, Los Angeles Blade), suicide.
- Pat McBride, 81, American soccer player (St. Louis Stars).
- Polly Allen Mellen, 100, American stylist and fashion editor (Harper's Bazaar, Vogue, Allure).
- Alain Pompidou, 82, French histologist and politician, MEP (1989–1999).
- Miguel Rincón Rincón, 73, Peruvian convicted terrorist (Túpac Amaru Revolutionary Movement), cancer.
- Vladimir Skočajić, 70, Bosnian football player (Velež Mostar, Apollon Kalamarias) and manager (Zrinjski Mostar).
- Albert Starr, 98, American cardiovascular surgeon.
- Purushottam Upadhyay, 90, Indian singer.
- Aili Vahtrapuu, 74, Estonian sculptor.
- Olavi Vuorisalo, 91, Finnish Olympic middle-distance runner (1960).
- Jermaine Walker, 47, American basketball player (Aris Thessaloniki).
- Deleta Williams, 89, American politician, member of the Missouri House of Representatives (1993–2003).
- Marek Żyliński, 72, Polish engineer and politician, MP (2001–2005).

=== 12 ===
- Adolovni Acosta, 77–78, Filipino classical pianist.
- Jeanne Bamberger, 100, American music educator.
- Ernie Beck, 93, American basketball player (Philadelphia Warriors).
- Wolfgang Becker, 70, German film director (Good Bye, Lenin!, Life Is All You Get, Child's Play) and screenwriter.
- Bratsa Bonifacho, 87, Serbian-born Canadian painter.
- Annelie Botes, 67, South African writer.
- Youcef Bouzidi, 67, Algerian football manager (NA Hussein Dey, JS Kabylie, MC Oran).
- Barry Cheatley, 85, Australian footballer (North Melbourne).
- Francesco Cinquemani, 57, Italian film director (Andron, Beyond the Edge, The Poison Rose), screenwriter, and journalist.
- Manny Davidson, 93, British businessman.
- R. Keith Dennis, 80, American mathematician.
- Lee Edwards, 92, American academic and political writer, co-founder of the Victims of Communism Memorial Foundation.
- Steven Englander, 63, American art collective director (ABC No Rio), lung disease.
- Jörg Fisch, 77, Swiss historian.
- Peter Fraenkel, 98, German-born British journalist and writer.
- Yvon Gattaz, 99, French electronics executive, co-founder and CEO of Radiall, president of the CNPF (1981–1986).
- Vic Gomersall, 82, English footballer (Swansea City, Manchester City).
- Dan Grecu, 74, Romanian gymnast, Olympic bronze medalist (1976).
- Amparo Guillén, 71, Ecuadorian actress, complications from diabetes and COVID-19.
- Fethi Haddaoui, 63, Tunisian actor (Kingdoms of Fire, Omar, Halfaouine: Boy of The Terraces).
- Phil Hancock, 71, American golfer, complications from amyotrophic lateral sclerosis.
- Tom Harrison, 85, American politician, member of the Montana House of Representatives (1967–1973) and Senate (1973–1977).
- Lee Tien-yu, 78, Taiwanese general and politician, minister of national defense (2007–2008) and chief of the general staff (2004–2007), pneumonia.
- Marie Manthey, 89, American nurse.
- Alberto Merlati, 81, Italian basketball player (Pallacanestro Cantù, Auxilium Pallacanestro Torino, national team).
- Bill Mlkvy, 93, American basketball player (Temple Owls, Philadelphia Warriors).
- Muhamad Said Jonit, 71–72, Malaysian politician, Johor State MLA (2018–2022).
- Duncan Norvelle, 66, English comedian, chest infection and sepsis.
- Daizō Nozawa, 91, Japanese politician, minister of justice (2003–2004) and member of the House of Councillors (1986–2004).
- Jean-Marie Pallardy, 84, French film director (White Fire).
- Amaury Pasos, 89, Brazilian Hall of Fame basketball player (Corinthians, national team), world champion (1959, 1963), Olympic bronze medallist (1960, 1964).
- Tommy Robb, 90, Northern Irish Grand Prix motorcycle racer.
- Papia Sarwar, 72, Bangladeshi singer, cancer.
- Wayne Simpson, 76, American baseball player (Cincinnati Reds, California Angels, Kansas City Royals).
- Martial Solal, 97, French jazz pianist and composer.
- Wolfgang Steiert, 61, German ski jumper and coach.
- Jim Tunney, 95, American football official.
- David Weatherley, 85, British-born New Zealand actor (The Lord of the Rings: The Fellowship of the Ring, Power Rangers Operation Overdrive, Home and Away).

=== 13 ===
- Duane Acker, 93, American academic, president of Kansas State University (1975–1986).
- Derek Ansell, 90, British music critic and jazz writer.
- Koko Ateba, Cameroonian singer and guitarist.
- James Callan, 77, American excommunicated Roman Catholic priest.
- Jon Camp, 75, English bassist (Renaissance).
- Mihir Kanti Chaudhuri, 77, Indian inorganic chemist and academic administrator, vice-chancellor of Tezpur University (2007–2017).
- Dan Coulter, 49, Canadian politician, British Columbia MLA (2020–2024).
- Diane Delano, 67, American actress (Northern Exposure, Popular, The Ellen Show), cancer.
- Carter J. Eckert, 78–79, American historian.
- Dimitrios Grafas, 87, Greek footballer (Ethnikos Piraeus, national team).
- Helal Hafiz, 76, Bangladeshi poet.
- Charles Handy, 92, Irish organizational behaviorist.
- Henk Herrenberg, 86, Surinamese diplomat and politician, minister of foreign affairs (1986–1987).
- Gheorghe Hioară, 76, Moldovan politician and diplomat, MP (1990–1994).
- Raúl Ilaquiche, 51, Ecuadorian lawyer and politician, deputy (2007), traffic collision.
- Jerome H. Kern, 87, American lawyer and investment banker, pancreatic cancer.
- Karloff Lagarde Jr., 54, Mexican professional wrestler (CMLL).
- Antero Laukkanen, 66, Finnish priest and politician, MP (2015–2023).
- Lemon Drop Kid, 28, American Thoroughbred racehorse, winner of the 1999 Belmont Stakes.
- Ron Locke, 85, American baseball player (New York Mets).
- Evelyn Lord, 98, American politician, member of the Delaware Senate (1962–1964), mayor of Beaumont, Texas (1990–1994, 2002–2005).
- Mick Minogue, 88, Irish hurling player (Roscrea) and coach (Moneygall).
- Joanne Pierce Misko, 83, American FBI agent.
- Lorraine O'Grady, 90, American artist.
- Kay Patterson, 93, American politician, member of the South Carolina House of Representatives (1975–1985) and Senate (1985–2008).
- Orrin H. Pilkey, 90, American marine geologist.
- Freddie Strahan, 85, Irish footballer (Shelbourne, national team).
- Bill Weber, 67, American sports broadcaster (NASCAR on NBC, NASCAR on TNT).
- Jimmy Wilkerson, 43, American football player (Kansas City Chiefs, Tampa Bay Buccaneers), heart attack.
- Axel Wirtz, 67, German government official and politician, member of the Landtag of North Rhine-Westphalia (1999–2017).

=== 14 ===
- Isak Andic, 71, Turkish-born Spanish businessman, founder and chairman of Mango, fall.
- Kevin Andrews, 69, Australian politician, MP (1991–2022), minister for defence (2014–2015) and social services (2013–2014), cancer.
- Austin Asche, 99, Australian jurist, administrator (1993–1997) and chief justice of the Northern Territory (1987–1993).
- Julio Camacho Aguilera, 100, Cuban politician and military officer.
- Israel Charny, 93, Israeli psychologist and genocide scholar.
- John R. Countryman, 91, American actor (Mr. Smith Goes to Washington, The Blue Bird) and diplomat, ambassador to Oman (1981–1985).
- George Cummings, 86, American guitarist (Dr. Hook & the Medicine Show) and songwriter.
- Mircea Diaconu, 74, Romanian actor (The Prophet, the Gold and the Transylvanians) and politician, minister of culture (2012) and MEP (2014–2019), colon cancer.
- Rachel Dror, 103, German-Israeli teacher and Holocaust survivor.
- E. V. K. S. Elangovan, 75, Indian politician, MP (2004–2009) and Tamil Nadu MLA (1984–1989, since 2023), lung disease.
- George Eugeniou, 93, Cypriot actor and theatre director.
- Pierre Ferdais, 76, Canadian Olympic handball player (1976).
- Frans Fiolet, 85, Dutch Olympic field hockey player.
- Silvino Francisco, 78, South African snooker player, British Open winner (1985).
- Monte Landis, 91, Scottish-American actor (Pee-wee's Big Adventure, Young Frankenstein, The Monkees).
- Frans Körver, 87, Dutch football player (MVV) and manager (MVV, Fortuna Sittard).
- Bill Miller, 84, American football player (Oakland Raiders, Dallas Texans, Buffalo Bills).
- Pamela Morsi, 73, American author.
- Frank Nabwiso, 84, Ugandan educator and politician, MP (2001–2006).
- Enema Paul, Nigerian politician.
- Lina Sagaral Reyes, 63, Filipino journalist (Philippine Daily Inquirer).
- Horst Schild, 82, German politician, MP (1994–2005).
- John Spratt, 82, American politician, member of the U.S. House of Representatives (1983–2011), complications from Parkinson's disease.
- Josef Taus, 92, Austrian politician and industrialist, member of the National Council (1975–1991).
- Giacinto Urso, 99, Italian politician, deputy (1963–1983).
- Ed Van Put, 88, American fisherman and author.
- Klaus Wöller, 68, German handball player, Olympic silver medalist (1984).

=== 15 ===
- Jean Adamson, 96, British writer (Topsy and Tim).
- Jodhaiya Bai Baiga, 86, Indian visual artist.
- Aziza Barnes, 32, American poet and playwright, suicide.
- Andrew Bennett, 85, British politician, MP (1974–2005).
- Juan Cárdenas Arroyo, 85, Colombian painter.
- Jaime Córdoba, 74, Curaçaoan politician, member (2010–2016, 2017–2021) and vice president (2012–2015) of the Parliament.
- Loren Graham, 91, American science historian.
- Zakir Hussain, 73, Indian tabla player (Shakti), idiopathic pulmonary fibrosis.
- Lionel Manga, 69, Cameroonian writer and art critic.
- Sławomir Marczewski, 74, Polish politician, MP (1993–1997).
- David A. McIntee, 55, British writer (White Darkness, Sanctuary, The Shadow of Weng-Chiang).
- Robert H. McKercher, 94, Canadian lawyer, president of the Law Society of Saskatchewan (1978) and the Canadian Bar Association (1983–1984).
- Chris Murphy, 56, Northern Irish Gaelic footballer (Castlewellan, Clan na Gael, Antrim).
- Hugh Planche, 93, Canadian politician, Alberta MLA (1975–1986).
- Fada Santoro, 100, Brazilian actress (La Delatora, Needle in the Haystack, Berlin to the Samba Beat).
- Shigeko Sasamori, 92, Japanese peace activist.
- Luis Suárez Fernández, 100, Spanish historian, member of the Royal Academy of History.
- Ankaralı Turgut, 61, Turkish singer, lung cancer.
- Monique Vézina, 89, Canadian politician, MP (1984–1993), minister of supply and services (1986–1988) and twice responsible for La Francophonie.
- Alexandra Zaharias, 95, American ballerina.
- Rezki Zerarti, 86, Algerian painter.

=== 16 ===
- S. M. Akram, 80, Bangladeshi politician, MP (1996–2001).
- Naa Amanua, 75–76, Ghanaian singer.
- Basim Bello, 61, Iraqi politician, mayor of Tel Keppe (2004–2017, 2018–2024).
- Thomas Berly, 92, Indian film director (Ithu Manushyano, Vellarikka Pattanam) and actor (Thiramala).
- Gunnar Breimo, 85, Norwegian politician, MP (1993–2001).
- Anita Bryant, 84, American singer ("Paper Roses", "My Little Corner of the World") and anti-gay rights activist (Save Our Children), cancer.
- Arlene Croce, 90, American dance critic (The New Yorker), co-founder of Ballet Review.
- Bob Davis, 83, American politician, member of the Texas House of Representatives (1973–1983).
- Richard Easterlin, 98, American economist.
- Gorica Gajević, 66, Serbian lawyer and politician.
- Tulsi Gowda, 86, Indian environmentalist.
- Enver Hadžihasanović, 74, Bosnian general and convicted war criminal.
- Jean Jennings, 70, American automobile journalist and editor (Car and Driver, Automobile), complications from Alzheimer's disease.
- James E. Malone Jr., 67, American politician, member of the Maryland House of Delegates (1995–2014), brain cancer.
- Margarita Mihneva, 72, Bulgarian journalist, cancer.
- Lisa Morris-Julian, 48, Trinidadian politician, MP (since 2020), fire.
- Khaled Nabhan, 54, Palestinian social media personality, air strike.
- Étienne Nguyễn Như Thể, 89, Vietnamese Roman Catholic prelate, coadjutor archbishop of Huế (1975–1983) and archbishop of Huế (1998–2012).
- Rodessa Barrett Porter, 94, American gospel singer (The Barrett Sisters), stroke.
- Andrew Radford, 79, British linguist.
- Kader Rahman, 85, Hong Kong Olympic field hockey player (1964).
- Henri Simon, 102, French Marxist militant.
- Prem Lal Singh, 87, Nepali politician, MP (1999–2008) and mayor of Kathmandu (1992–1997), stomach disease.
- Eugene Stevens, 85, American chemist.
- Gary Sutherland, 80, American baseball player (Philadelphia Phillies, Montreal Expos, Detroit Tigers), cholangiocarcinoma.
- Yoshio Taniguchi, 87, Japanese architect (MoMA), pneumonia.
- Dick Van Arsdale, 81, American basketball player (New York Knicks, Phoenix Suns), kidney failure.
- Wittekind, Prince of Waldeck and Pyrmont, 88, German member of former princely house.

=== 17 ===
- Roshan Lal Anand, 100, Indian sports administrator.
- Alfa Anderson, 78, American singer (Chic).
- Gian Paolo Barbieri, 89, Italian fashion photographer.
- Francis Bellotti, 101, American politician, lieutenant governor (1963–1965) and attorney general (1975–1987) of Massachusetts.
- Mark Braunias, 69, New Zealand painter.
- Mike Brewer, 80, American musician (Brewer & Shipley) and songwriter ("One Toke Over the Line").
- David Brodie, 81, British motor racing driver.
- Bill Calhoun, 97, American basketball player (Rochester Royals, Baltimore Bullets, Milwaukee Hawks).
- Michel del Castillo, 91, French writer.
- Roberto Esteban Chavez, 92, American artist.
- Nicholas Chia, 86, Singaporean Roman Catholic prelate, archbishop of Singapore (2001–2013).
- Rayful Edmond, 60, American drug trafficker, heart attack.
- Aigars Fadejevs, 48, Latvian athlete, Olympic silver medalist (2000).
- Dmytro Habinet, 41, Ukrainian jurist and politician, governor of Khmelnytskyi Oblast (2019–2020).
- Patricia Johnson, 95, English operatic mezzo-soprano.
- Mary Keir, 112, British supercentenarian, oldest person in Wales (since 2021).
- Kevin Kelly, 79, Irish Gaelic footballer (Carbury, Athlone, Kildare).
- Hassan Khan, 88, Indian politician, MP (1999–2004, 2009–2014).
- Mary Ellen Kimball, 95, American baseball player (Racine Belles).
- Igor Kirillov, 54, Russian military officer, commander of the Russian NBC Protection Troops (since 2017), bombing.
- Ralph Klemme, 85, American politician, member of the Iowa House of Representatives (1993–2005), cancer.
- Alex Kroll, 87, American football player (New York Titans).
- Nikolai Kryzhanovsky, 87, Belarusian politician, deputy (1990–1995).
- William Labov, 97, American linguist.
- Li Jianping, 64, Chinese politician, executed.
- José Antonio Lopetegui, 94, Spanish harrijasotzaile.
- David Mallett, 73, American singer and songwriter ("Garden Song").
- Marcel Marnat, 91, French musicologist, journalist, and radio producer.
- Alphonse S. Marotta, 90, American politician, member of the Connecticut House of Representatives (1990–1993).
- Berrien Moore, 83, American mathematician and earth scientist.
- Banu Onaral, 75, Turkish biomedical engineer, cancer.
- Marisa Paredes, 78, Spanish actress (In a Glass Cage, Life Is Beautiful, Deep Crimson), heart failure.
- Willie Phua, 96, Singaporean cameraman.
- Beatriz Sarlo, 82, Argentine writer, essayist and literary critic, complications from a stroke.
- Son Se-il, 89, South Korean journalist and politician, MP (1981–1985, 1992–2000).
- Roger C. Thomas, 85, British physiologist.
- Colin Tilney, 91, Canadian harpsichordist, pianist and teacher.
- Jānis Timma, 32, Latvian basketball player (ASK Riga, Zenit Saint Petersburg, Olympiacos), suicide.
- Arnold Uhrlass, 93, American Olympic speed skater (1960) and cyclist (1964).
- Rik Van Looy, 90, Belgian Hall of Fame racing cyclist, Olympic champion (1952), world champion (1960, 1961).

=== 18 ===
- Alan Adler, 92, Australian photo booth owner.
- Cosmas Michael Angkur, 87, Indonesian Roman Catholic prelate, bishop of Bogor (1994–2013).
- Tony Bentley, 84, English footballer (Southend United).
- Patrick Conolly-Carew, 7th Baron Carew, 86, Irish Olympic equestrian (1972) and hereditary peer, member of the House of Lords (1994–1999).
- James Coffey, 85, American politician, member of the New Hampshire House of Representatives (2010–2016).
- Dietmar Constantini, 69, Austrian football player (SWW Innsbruck) and manager (Mainz 05, national team), complications from dementia.
- Joseph Corcoran, 49, American convicted mass murderer, execution by lethal injection.
- Carole Crawford, 81, Jamaican model and beauty queen, Miss World (1963).
- Thomas R. DiLuglio, 93, American politician, Rhode Island lieutenant governor (1977–1985).
- Vladimir Dorokhov, 70, Russian volleyball player, Olympic champion (1980).
- Slim Dunlap, 73, American guitarist (The Replacements).
- Daniel Haller, 95, American film director (Die, Monster, Die!, The Dunwich Horror, Buck Rogers in the 25th Century) and art designer.
- Sigrid Kehl, 95, German operatic soprano (Leipzig Opera).
- Frank Kendrick, 74, American basketball player (Purdue Boilermakers, Golden State Warriors).
- Pei Krishnan, 65, Indian actor (Kalakalappu).
- Martin Lodge, 70, New Zealand composer and musicologist.
- Fred Lorenzen, 89, American Hall of Fame racing driver, Daytona 500 winner (1965), complications from dementia.
- John Marsden, 74, Australian writer (Tomorrow, When the War Began, So Much to Tell You).
- Marty Mayberry, 38, Australian alpine skier, Paralympic silver medalist (2010).
- Serhiy Olizarenko, 70, Ukrainian Olympic steeplechase runner (1980).
- Hermes Phettberg, 72, Austrian artist, comedian and actor.
- Ann Rockefeller Roberts, 90, American activist for native Americans, complications from surgery.
- Colin P. Rourke, 81, British mathematician.
- Zilia Sánchez Domínguez, 98, Cuban-born Puerto Rican visual artist.
- Bjørn Sand, 96, Norwegian actor.
- Damian Scarf, 41, New Zealand psychologist.
- Heikki Silvennoinen, 70, Finnish musician (Tabula Rasa), comedian (Kummeli), and actor (Kummeli: Kultakuume).
- Sokratis Skartsis, 88, Greek poet, writer, and academic.
- Friedrich St. Florian, 91, Austrian-American architect (World War II Memorial, Providence Place).
- Pat White, 76, American politician, member of the West Virginia House of Delegates (1984–1994), neuroendocrine carcinoma.
- Klaus Wolfermann, 78, German javelin thrower, Olympic champion (1972).

=== 19 ===
- George L. Bartlett, 100, American marine corps brigadier general.
- Sandra Blain, 82–83, American ceramics artist.
- Clancy Blair, 63, American developmental psychologist.
- Stanley Booth, 82, American music journalist.
- Fabrizio Capucci, 85, Italian composer and actor (The Warm Life, Rita the American Girl).
- Margalida Castro, 81, Colombian actress (Yo y tú, Adrián está de visita, La viuda de la mafia), cancer.
- Henry Craft, 75, American politician, member of the Tennessee House of Representatives (1973–1975).
- Shankar Dayal, 54, Indian film director and screenwriter (Saguni), heart attack.
- Richard E. Fletcher, 89, American politician, member of the New Hampshire House of Representatives (1998–2004, 2006–2008).
- Gaboro, 23, Swedish rapper, shot.
- Meena Ganesh, 82, Indian actress (Mukha Chithram, Pingami, Achan Kombathu Amma Varampathu), stroke.
- Vakhtang Golandzia, 55, Abkhazian politician, MP, shot.
- Eddi Gutenkauf, 96, Luxembourgian Olympic fencer.
- Martha Keys, 94, American politician, member of the U.S. House of Representatives (1975–1979).
- Michael Leunig, 79, Australian cartoonist.
- Barry N. Malzberg, 85, American writer (The Falling Astronauts, Beyond Apollo, In the Stone House) and editor, pneumonia and bacterial infection.
- Federico Mayor Zaragoza, 90, Spanish scientist, academic and politician, director-general of UNESCO (1987–1999), minister of education and science (1981–1982) and MEP (1987).
- Darshanam Mogilaiah, 73, Indian tribal musician, kidney disease.
- Martin Óg Morrissey, 90, Irish hurler (Mount Sion) and Gaelic footballer (Waterford).
- Francisco Nemenzo, 89, Filipino political scientist, president of the University of the Philippines (1999–2005) and chancellor of UP Visayas (1989–1992).
- Patrick O'Donnell, 59, Northern Irish Gaelic footballer (Banagher, Derry).
- Robert Paul, 87, Canadian figure skater, Olympic champion (1960) and four-time world champion.
- Patrick Pillay, 75, Seychellois politician, speaker of the National Assembly (2016–2018).
- Art Seaberg, 88, American politician, member of the Minnesota House of Representatives (1983–1993).
- Kirsten Simone, 90, Danish ballerina.
- Miet Smet, 81, Belgian politician, senator (2007–2010), MEP (1999–2004), and Flemish MP (since 2004).
- Paul Szabo, 76, Canadian politician, MP (1993–2011).
- Joanna Tope, 80, English actress (Emmerdale, The Omega Factor, The Tomorrow People).
- Ken Tschumper, 74, American politician, member of the Minnesota House of Representatives (2007–2009), cancer.
- Uncle Mo, 16, American Thoroughbred racehorse, euthanized.
- Kevin Underwood, 45, American convicted murderer, execution by lethal injection.
- Gwen Van Dam, 96, American actress (Coming Home, Stir Crazy, True Confessions).
- Dennis Wainwright, 89, Bermudian cricketer (national team) and footballer (national team).
- Tsuneo Watanabe, 98, Japanese journalist and publisher (Yomiuri Shimbun), pneumonia.
- Ralph Wayne, 92, American politician, member of the Texas House of Representatives (1964–1972).
- Russ Weeks, 82, American politician, member of the West Virginia Senate (2002–2006).
- Wincey Willis, 76, British television and radio broadcaster (Good Morning Britain, Treasure Hunt).
- Xie Fang, 89, Chinese actress (Two Stage Sisters, The Chinese Widow).
- Charles Young Jr., 62, American politician, member of the Mississippi House of Representatives (since 2012).

=== 20 ===
- Tofig Aghababayev, 96, Azerbaijani painter.
- A. F. Hassan Ariff, 83, Bangladeshi lawyer, attorney general (2001–2005) and civil aviation and tourism (since 2024).
- Čedomir Božić, 40, Serbian administrator and politician, mayor of Žabalj (2012–2020), heart attack.
- Om Prakash Chautala, 89, Indian politician, four-time chief minister of Haryana, cardiac arrest.
- C-Confion, 26, Ghanaian actor and comedian.
- Sugar Pie DeSanto, 89, American singer.
- George Eastham, 88, English footballer (Arsenal, Stoke City, national team).
- John Erwin, 88, American voice actor (He-Man and the Masters of the Universe, She-Ra: Princess of Power, The Archie Show).
- Giovanni Graber, 85, Italian Olympic luger (1964, 1968).
- Ann Hartley, 82, New Zealand politician, MP (1999–2008), mayor of North Shore City (1989–1992).
- Rickey Henderson, 65, American Hall of Fame baseball player (Oakland Athletics, New York Yankees, San Diego Padres), World Series champion (1989, 1993), pneumonia.
- Jonathan Holden, 83, American poet.
- Thierry Jacob, 59, French boxer, WBC world champion (1992).
- Vilmos Jakab, 72, Hungarian Olympic boxer (1976).
- Barbara Kawakami, 103, Japanese-born American author and scholar.
- Zaur Kaziev, 41, Russian footballer (FC Sheksna Cherepovets, FC Olimp-Dolgoprudny). (death announced on this date)
- June Kreuzer, 80, American politician, member of the Ohio House of Representatives (1983–1986).
- Abigail McGrath, 84, American writer, actor, and playwright.
- Bernard McGurrin, 91, English rugby league player (Wigan, Leigh).
- Kurt Laurenz Metzler, 83, Swiss sculptor.
- Raja Mitra, 79, Indian film director, cancer.
- Gearóid Ó Cairealláin, 67, Irish language activist, editor and president of Conradh na Gaeilge.
- Shirish B. Patel, 92, Indian civil engineer.
- Rey Misterio, 66, Mexican professional wrestler (AAA, WWA).
- Leif Silbersky, 86, Swedish lawyer and author.
- Turgut Toydemir, 86, Turkish architect, shot.
- Muriel Stanley Venne, 87, Canadian Métis community leader and Indigenous rights activist.
- C. B. Zaman, 78–79, Bangladeshi film director (Puroskar) and actor (Ek Takar Bou), heart attack.
- George Zebrowski, 78, Austrian-born American science fiction writer (Macrolife, The Killing Star, Nebula Awards 20).
- Helena Zeťová, 44, Czech singer.

=== 21 ===
- Godwin Abbe, 75, Nigerian politician, minister of defence (2009–2010) and interior (2007–2009), governor of Akwa Ibom State (1988–1990).
- Catherine Aird, 94, English novelist.
- Jack Bond, 87, British film director (Separation, Anti-Clock, It Couldn't Happen Here).
- Michelle Botes, 62, South African actress (American Ninja 2: The Confrontation, Arende, Isidingo), cancer.
- Casey Chaos, 59, American punk and metal singer (Amen, Christian Death, Scum), heart attack.
- Stephen Chmilar, 79, Canadian Ukrainian Catholic hierarch, bishop of Toronto and Eastern Canada (2003–2019).
- Martin Dechev, 34, Bulgarian footballer (Montana, Oborishte, Slavia Sofia).
- Art Evans, 82, American actor (Die Hard 2, A Soldier's Story, Fright Night), complications from diabetes.
- Woody Fraser, 90, American television producer (The Mike Douglas Show, Good Morning America) and director.
- Murray H. Goodman, 99, American real estate developer and philanthropist.
- Harvendra Singh Hanspal, 86, Indian politician, MP (1980–1992).
- Max Hayslette, 94, American painter.
- Hannelore Hoger, 82, German actress (Long Hello and Short Goodbye, Henri 4, Heidi).
- Jeanne Wakatsuki Houston, 90, American World War II internee and author (Farewell to Manzanar).
- Maïté, 86, French restaurateur and television presenter.
- Don Martina, 89, Curaçaoan politician, prime minister of the Netherlands Antilles (1979–1984, 1986–1988).
- Hudson Meek, 16, American actor (Baby Driver, 90 Minutes in Heaven), traffic collision.
- Rohan Mirchandani, 42, Indian industrialist, cardiac arrest.
- Eric Saarinen, 82, American cinematographer (The Hills Have Eyes, Lost in America, You Light Up My Life).
- John Sykes, 65, English guitarist (Thin Lizzy, Whitesnake) and songwriter ("Is This Love"), cancer.
- Brian Turner, 91, Australian footballer (Collingwood, North Melbourne).
- Bernhard Worms, 94, German politician, member of the Landtag of North Rhine-Westphalia (1970–1990), MP (1990).
- Jerome T. Youngman, 73, American musician.

=== 22 ===
- Louis Bechtle, 97, American jurist, judge (1972–2001) and chief judge (1990–1993) of the U. S. District Court for the Eastern District of Pennsylvania.
- Geoffrey Deuel, 81, American actor (The Young and the Restless, The F.B.I., Chisum), chronic obstructive pulmonary disease.
- David B. Douzanis, 74, American politician, member of the New Hampshire House of Representatives (1974–1976).
- Vincent Fort, 68, American politician, member of the Georgia State Senate (1996–2017), cancer.
- Qamruddin Ahmad Gorakhpuri, 86, Indian Islamic scholar.
- Awang Faroek Ishak, 76, Indonesian politician, governor of East Kalimantan (2008–2018).
- Eduard Kuznetsov, 85, Russian-Israeli dissident, journalist, and writer, co-leader of the Dymshits–Kuznetsov hijacking affair.
- Murray D. Levy, 79, American politician, member of the Maryland House of Delegates (2004–2011).
- Dieter Lindner, 85, German footballer (Eintracht Frankfurt).
- Liu Yuan, 64, Chinese musician, cancer.
- Youssef Nada, 93, Egyptian banker, co-founder of Al Taqwa Bank.
- Marilyn Oshman, 85, American businesswoman.
- Stuart A. Rice, 92, American theoretical and physical chemist.
- Augusto Rollandin, 75, Italian politician, senator (2001–2006) and president of Aosta Valley (1984–1990, 2008–2017).
- Herbert Rusche, 72, German LGBTQ activist and politician, MP (1985–1987).
- Hans Jörg Schimanek, 84, Austrian journalist and politician, member of the Landtag of Lower Austria (1999–2000).
- Alan Senauke, 77, American Sōtō Zen priest, folk musician, and poet, complications from a heart attack.
- Mykola Soroka, 72, Ukrainian politician, governor of Rivne Oblast (1997–2005) and MP (2012–2014).
- Roze Stiebra, 82, Latvian animator.
- Stewart Stover, 86, American football player (Dallas Texans/Kansas City Chiefs, Hamilton Tiger-Cats).

=== 23 ===
- Suvojit Banerjee, 39, Indian cricketer (Bengal), cardiac arrest.
- Shyam Benegal, 90, Indian film director (Ankur, Nishant, Mammo) and politician, MP (2006–2012), kidney disease.
- Alf Beus, 70, Australian footballer (South Melbourne).
- Dési Bouterse, 79, Surinamese politician, military officer, and convicted murderer, commander of the Armed Forces (1980–1990), chairman of the National Military Council (1980–1987) and president (2010–2020), liver failure.
- Vladimir Burakov, 70, Russian politician.
- Michael Burkard, 77, American poet and educator.
- Burt, c. 90, Australian saltwater crocodile and animal actor (Crocodile Dundee). (death announced on this date)
- Colin Campbell, 78, British Olympic middle-distance runner (1968, 1972) and bobsledder (1976).
- Karlyn Kohrs Campbell, 87, American academic, complications from Alzheimer's disease.
- Teodoras Četrauskas, 80, Lithuanian writer and literary translator.
- Edward Champlin, 76, American academic (Princeton University).
- Faiz Ali Chishti, 97, Pakistani general, heart and lung disease.
- Gary Cohn, 72, American investigative reporter and academic.
- Timothy Cullen, 80, American politician, member of the Wisconsin Senate (1975–1987, 2011–2015), heart condition.
- Talaat Dahshan, 81, Egyptian Olympic boxer.
- George DeTitta Sr., 94, American set decorator (Ragtime, Fatal Attraction, Saturday Night Fever).
- Tigran Eganyan, 46, Armenian politician, MP (2005–2006).
- Mick Fleming, 91, Irish hurler (St Senan's, Kilkenny).
- Brian Freemantle, 88, English writer (Charlie Muffin) and journalist (Daily Mail, Daily Sketch), complications from Parkinson's disease.
- Thomas Gaither, 86, American botanist and civil rights activist (Friendship Nine).
- Mihály Gellér, 77, Hungarian Olympic ski jumper (1968).
- Wacław Gluth-Nowowiejski, 98, Polish publicist and author.
- John O'Gorman, Australian rugby union player (national team).
- Gerardo Guevara, 94, Ecuadorian composer.
- Sophie Hediger, 26, Swiss Olympic snowboarder (2022), avalanche.
- Earnest Johnson, 72, American politician, member of the Alabama House of Representatives (1994–1998).
- Hanna Katzir, 78, Israeli hostage.
- Anatoly Khvorostov, 84, Russian art historian.
- Angus MacInnes, 77, Canadian actor (Star Wars, Strange Brew, Witness).
- Pere Moles, 89, Andorran politician and historian, four-time general councillor.
- Dalmacio Negro Pavón, 93, Spanish philosopher, member of the Royal Academy of Moral and Political Sciences.
- Zhaleh Olov, 97, Iranian actress (Wood Pigeon, Dash Akol, The Fateful Day).
- Victor Parsonnet, 100, American cardiac surgeon.
- Gordon Pulley, 88, English footballer (Gillingham, Millwall, Peterborough United).
- Sylvia Rambo, 88, American jurist, judge of the U.S. District Court for Middle Pennsylvania (1979–2024).
- Leigh Robertson, 74, Australian footballer (Fitzroy).
- Regina Sarfaty, 90, American opera singer.
- Helmut Schlesinger, 100, German economist, president of the Deutsche Bundesbank (1991–1993).
- Mel Shapiro, 89, American theater director.
- Shi Zhongheng, 94, Chinese engineer, member of the Chinese Academy of Engineering.
- Chris Sobkowicz, 71, Canadian wheelchair curler, cancer.
- Carole Wilbourn, 84, American cat therapist.

=== 24 ===
- Nils Aaness, 88, Norwegian Olympic speed skater (1960, 1964).
- Arlene Agus, 75, American writer. (body discovered on this date)
- Joe Average, 67, Canadian artist.
- Curtis Cheek, 66, American bridge player.
- Jiří Čížek, 86, Czechoslovak-born Canadian chemist.
- Richard M. Cohen, 76, American journalist, television producer (CBS News, CNN), and author, acute respiratory failure.
- Alceu Collares, 97, Brazilian politician, governor of Rio Grande do Sul (1991–1995) and mayor of Porto Alegre (1986–1989), pneumonia.
- Constantin Drumen, 74, Romanian politician, deputy (1996–2000).
- Alfredo Fiorito, 71, Argentine disc jockey. (death announced on this date)
- Edwin Gastanes, 66, Filipino lawyer and sports administrator, general secretary of the Philippine Football Federation (2013–2023) and Philippine Olympic Committee (2019–2023).
- Mary Lou Graham, 88, American baseball player (South Bend Blue Sox).
- Pascal Hervé, 60, French Olympic road racing cyclist (1992).
- Tom Hyland, 72, Irish human rights activist, campaigner for the East Timorese people.
- Akitomo Kaneko, 97, Japanese Olympic gymnast (1952).
- Charles F. Lettow, 83, American lawyer and jurist, judge of the United States Court of Federal Claims (since 2003).
- Dorthy Moxley, 92, American crime victim advocate, influenza.
- Richard Perry, 82, American record producer ("You're So Vain", "Photograph", "Slow Hand").
- George Petak, 75, American politician, member of the Wisconsin Senate (1991–1996), cancer.
- Alfredo Prior, 72, Argentine painter, writer and musician.
- Utz Rothe, 84, Austrian artist, fire.
- Octavio Salazar Miranda, 72, Peruvian politician, MP (2011–2019), minister of the interior (2009–2010).
- Priya Suriyasena, 80, Sri Lankan singer.

=== 25 ===
- Britt Allcroft, 81, English writer (Thomas & Friends).
- Ouanes Amor, 88, French painter.
- Paul Abine Ayah, 74, Cameroonian politician, MP (2002–2011).
- Bill Bergey, 79, American football player (Cincinnati Bengals, Philadelphia Eagles), cancer.
- Brent Billingsley, 49, American baseball player (Florida Marlins).
- Johann Böhm, 95, Romanian-born German historian.
- Jax Dane, 48, American professional wrestler (NWA, ROH), complications from a heart attack.
- Dulce, 69, Mexican singer and actress, lung cancer.
- Eric Hänni, 86, Swiss judoka, Olympic silver medalist (1964).
- Bernice Heloo, 70, Ghanaian politician, MP (2013–2017).
- Farhad Karibov, 72, Azerbaijani politician, MP (2005–2015).
- María Antonia Morales, 93, Chilean judge, justice of the Supreme Court (2001–2006).
- Mary Murphy, 85, American politician, member of the Minnesota House of Representatives (1977–2023), complications from a stroke.
- M. T. Vasudevan Nair, 91, Indian novelist (Naalukettu, Manju, Kaalam) and screenwriter, heart failure.
- Kiriko Nananan, 52, Japanese manga artist (Blue, Strawberry Shortcakes).
- Dora Moono Nyambe, 32, Zambian humanitarian and social media personality.
- Brady Paxton, 77, American politician, member of the West Virginia House of Delegates (1993–1995, 1999–2014).
- Carlos Pedroso, 57, Cuban fencer, Olympic bronze medallist (2000), burns.
- Bapsi Sidhwa, 86, Pakistani novelist (Cracking India, Water, The Crow Eaters).
- Osamu Suzuki, 94, Japanese automotive industry executive, president (1978–2000) and chairman (2000–2021) of Suzuki, lymphoma.
- Marie Winn, 88, American author (The Plug-In Drug) and journalist (The Wall Street Journal).
- Notable Azerbaijanis killed in the crash of Azerbaijan Airlines Flight 8243:
  - Hokuma Aliyeva, 33, flight attendant
  - Aleksandr Kalyaninov, 32, pilot
  - Igor Kshnyakin, 62, pilot

=== 26 ===
- Robert Baldwin, 59, Japanese-Canadian actor (Zyuden Sentai Kyoryuger), colon cancer.
- Sammy Thurman Brackenbury, 91, American Hall of Fame barrel racer.
- Dick Capri, 93, American actor (They Still Call Me Bruce) and comedian, aortic dissection.
- John B. Cobb, 99, American environmentalist and theologian.
- Gary Conklin, 92, American documentarian (Memories of Berlin: The Twilight of Weimar Culture, Gore Vidal: The Man Who Said No).
- Mary Damron, 70, American missionary, cancer.
- Sabapathy Dekshinamurthy, 61, Indian film director (Bharathan).
- Yoshitaka Egawa, 82, Japanese Olympic basketball player (1964).
- Richard Gibson, 89, British architect.
- Chisako Kakehi, 78, Japanese serial killer.
- Ney Latorraca, 80, Brazilian actor (Vamp, Da Cor do Pecado, TV Pirata), prostate cancer.
- Daniel Légère, 65, Canadian trade unionist, liver cancer.
- Josef Lewkowicz, 98, Polish-Israeli Holocaust survivor and Nazi hunter.
- Patricia MacGuigan, 85, American judge.
- OG Maco, 32, American rapper ("U Guessed It", "Doctor Pepper"), suicide by gunshot.
- Phebe Marr, 93, American historian.
- Salem Masadeh, 94, Jordanian politician. (death announced on this date)
- Paul Oreffice, 97, Italian-born American businessman.
- Gianpaolo Ormezzano, 89, Italian journalist (La Stampa, Guerin Sportivo, Tuttosport).
- Richard Parsons, 76, American financial and media executive (CBS, Time Warner), chairman of Citigroup (2009–2012), multiple myeloma.
- Akumal Ramachander, 75, Indian art critic and writer.
- Cassandra Salguero, 21, Mexican beach soccer player.
- Tom Seabron, 67, American football player (San Francisco 49ers, St. Louis Cardinals), heart attack.
- Manmohan Singh, 92, Indian politician, prime minister (2004–2014), MP (1991–2024), and minister of finance (1991–1996), heart disease.
- Konstantin Smeshko, 61, Russian military commander.
- Ruslan Solyanyk, 40, Ukrainian footballer (Vorskla Poltava, Mariupol, FC Tytan Armiansk).
- Ernst Terhardt, 90, German engineer.
- William E. Thurman, 93, American lieutenant general.
- Sergei Toporov, 53, Russian football player (Zarya Leninsk-Kuznetsky, SOYUZ-Gazprom Izhevsk) and manager (Shakhta Raspadskaya Mezhdurechensk).
- Vladimir Tsyrenov, 83, Russian long-distance and marathon runner.
- Janet Wanja, 40, Kenyan Olympic volleyball player (2004), gallbladder cancer.
- Geoff Wheel, 73, Welsh rugby player (Mumbles, Swansea, national team), motor neurone disease.

=== 27 ===
- Toshiyuki Adachi, 70, Japanese politician, MP (since 2016), shipwreck.
- Soraya Bedjora Adiong, 80, Filipino politician, governor of Lanao del Sur (2016–2019).
- Daniele Bagnoli, 71, Italian volleyball coach (Top Volley Latina).
- Paul Bamba, 35, Puerto Rican boxer.
- Arnold M. Brown, 93, American politician, member of the South Dakota House of Representatives (1993–1997) and Senate (1997–2005).
- Nigel Buesst, 86, Australian filmmaker (Dead Easy, Come Out Fighting, Compo).
- Mickey Bullock, 78, English footballer (Leyton Orient, Halifax Town, Oxford United).
- Richard F. Colburn, 74, American politician, member of the Maryland House of Delegates (1983–1991) and Senate (1995–2015).
- Frank Driscoll, 90, Australian footballer (Essendon).
- Kari Dziedzic, 62, American politician, member of the Minnesota Senate (since 2012), ovarian cancer.
- Tony Geraghty, 92, British journalist (The Boston Globe, The Sunday Times) and paratrooper.
- Greg Gumbel, 78, American sportscaster (CBS Sports, NFL), cancer.
- Dayle Haddon, 76, Canadian model and actress (The World's Greatest Athlete, North Dallas Forty, Cyborg), carbon monoxide poisoning.
- Olivia Hussey, 73, British actress (Romeo and Juliet, Black Christmas, Jesus of Nazareth), breast cancer.
- Juan Jaime, 37, Dominican baseball player (Atlanta Braves, Chunichi Dragons), heart attack.
- Bachuki Kardava, 54, Georgian politician, MP (2020–2024), perforated ulcer.
- Humberto Lepe Lepe, 75, Mexican politician, MP (2009–2012). (death announced on this date)
- Stavri Lubonja, 89, Albanian football player (Dinamo Tirana) and manager (Flamurtari, Dinamo Tirana).
- Geraldo Magela, 89, Brazilian lawyer and politician, attorney general (1993–2000), minister of defence (2000–2003).
- Abdul Rehman Makki, 70, Pakistani Islamist, co-founder of Lashkar-e-Taiba, heart attack.
- Charles C. Mann, 89, American politician, member of the Georgia House of Representatives (1975–1983).
- Charlie Maxwell, 97, American baseball player (Detroit Tigers, Boston Red Sox, Chicago White Sox).
- Lloyd Miller, 86, American jazz musician.
- Ted Mittet, 83, American rower, Olympic bronze medallist (1964).
- Rustam Shah Mohmand, 82, Pakistani diplomat, interior secretary (1999) and Chief Secretary of Khyber Pakhtunkhwa (1997–1998).
- John Moore, 79, English footballer (Shrewsbury Town, Swansea City, Stoke City).
- Arnold Orowae, 69, Papua New Guinean Roman Catholic prelate, auxiliary bishop (1999–2004), coadjutor bishop (2004–2008) and bishop (since 2008) of Wabag.
- Cesare Ragazzi, 83, Italian businessman and television personality.
- David B. Rivkin, 68, American attorney and conservative commentator.
- Svetozar Šapurić, 64, Serbian football player (Vrbas, Vojvodina) and manager (Ethnikos Achna).
- Dame Rosalind Savill, 73, British museum curator, cancer.
- Charles Shyer, 83, American screenwriter and film director (Private Benjamin, Father of the Bride, The Parent Trap).
- Frank Wilson, 80, Welsh rugby union (Cardiff RFC) and rugby league (St Helens, Salford) player.
- Charlie Wright, 86, Scottish football player (Grimsby Town, Charlton Athletic) and manager (Bolton Wanderers).
- Ann Wylie, 102, New Zealand botanist.

=== 28 ===
- Sverre Aarseth, 90, Norwegian astronomer.
- David Bull, 90, British art restorer.
- Dick Creed, 93, American football official (Super Bowl) (XXVI and XXX).
- George W. Davis Jr., 91, American military officer.
- Charles Dolan, 98, American businessman, founder of Cablevision and HBO.
- Pierre-Sylvain Filliozat, 88, French-Indian linguist.
- Nancy Hadley, 94, American actress (Perry Mason, The George Burns and Gracie Allen Show, Frontier Uprising) and model.
- Martin Karplus, 94, Austrian-American theoretical chemist (Karplus equation), Nobel Prize laureate (2013), fall.
- Mary Anne Krupsak, 92, American lawyer and politician, New York lieutenant governor (1975–1978), member of the New York State Assembly (1969–1972) and Senate (1973–1974).
- Jeremy Lansman, 82, American radio engineer.
- Émile Lejeune, 86, Belgian footballer (RFC Liège, national team).
- Leonard Lilyholm, 83, American ice hockey player (Minnesota Fighting Saints), traffic collision.
- Abdulkadir Aliyu Mahe, 72–73, Nigerian politician.
- Ebadollah S. Mahmoodian, 81, Iranian mathematician.
- Dietrich Möller, 87, German politician, mayor of Marburg (1993–2005) and member of the Landtag of Hesse (1978–1993).
- Lars Martin Myhre, 68, Norwegian composer, guitarist and pianist.
- Paavo Nikula, 82, Finnish politician, minister of justice (1978–1979), chancellor of justice (1998–2007), and MP (1991–1998).
- John Nix, 93, Australian footballer (Richmond).
- Patricia Norford, 92, Australian Olympic fencer.
- Barre Phillips, 90, American jazz musician.
- Rudolf Podgornik, 69, Slovene theoretical physicist.
- Enrico Rabbachin, 81, Italian Olympic sports shooter (1980).
- Walter Saldanha, 93, Indian advertising industry executive.
- Jana Synková, 80, Czech actress (Calamity, Prachy dělaj člověka).
- János Szerényi, 86, Hungarian Olympic long-distance runner (1968). (death announced on this date)
- Herbert R. Temple Jr., 96, American military officer, chief of the National Guard Bureau (1986–1990).
- Fran Toy, 90, American Episcopal priest.
- Peter Vail, 94, American geologist and geophysicist.
- Josh White Jr., 84, American musician.
- Virgil Wood, 93, American civil rights activist.
- Yoyo, c. 54, Spanish elephant, oldest known living elephant.

=== 29 ===
- Ahmed Adaweyah, 79, Egyptian singer and actor.
- Gladys Afamado, 99, Uruguayan visual artist, engraver and poet.
- Marie-Claude Beaud, 78, French art exhibition curator.
- Simon Baliol Brett, 81, British artist.
- Aaron Brown, 76, American broadcaster (ABC, CNN).
- Aleksei Bugayev, 43, Russian footballer (Torpedo Moscow, Tom Tomsk, national team), killed in action.
- Jim Campbell, 81, American baseball player (St. Louis Cardinals).
- Eric Carlson, 66, American heavy metal guitarist (Mentors), cancer.
- Jimmy Carter, 100, American politician and humanitarian, president (1977–1981), governor of Georgia (1971–1975) and Nobel Prize laureate (2002).
- Stan Charnofsky, 93, American psychologist.
- Paul D. Cronin, 88, American equestrian.
- George Dames, 87, American politician, member of the Missouri House of Representatives (1971–1993).
- Grigore Eremei, 89, Moldovan politician and diplomat.
- George Folsey Jr., 85, American film producer and editor (Animal House, The Blues Brothers, Coming to America), pneumonia.
- Elena Fonseca, 94, Uruguayan activist and radio journalist, co-founder of Cotidiano Mujer.
- Han Tong-il, 83, South Korean pianist.
- Tomiko Itooka, 116, Japanese supercentenarian, world's oldest person (since 2024).
- Kishore Kunal, 74, Indian policeman (Ayodhya dispute).
- Jagnula Kunovska, 81, Macedonian jurist, politician, and artist.
- Phil Lang, 95, American politician, member (1961–1979) and speaker (1975–1979) of the Oregon House of Representatives.
- Linda Lavin, 87, American actress (Alice, B Positive, Broadway Bound), Tony winner (1987), complications from lung cancer.
- Dada Masilo, 39, South African dancer and choreographer.
- Bob McNeil, 82, New Zealand journalist and news presenter (TV3), complications from Alzheimer's disease.
- Thomas Carlos Mehen, 54, American physicist.
- Yoshiharu Minami, 73, Japanese Olympic judoka.
- Satish Pradhan, 84, Indian politician, MP (1992–2004).
- Lenny Randle, 75, American baseball player (Texas Rangers, Seattle Mariners, New York Mets).
- Leonard W. Riches, 85, American Anglican clergyman, presiding bishop of the Reformed Episcopal Church (1996–2014) and bishop ordinary of the Northeast and Mid-Atlantic (1984–2008), cancer.
- Oscar Schneider, 97, German politician, minister for regional planning, building and urban development (1982–1989) and MP (1969–1994).
- Dileep Shankar, 54, Indian actor, director and writer.
- Magnus Sjöberg, 97, Swedish jurist, prosecutor-general (1978–1989).
- Xing Qiuhen, 94, Chinese physicist and academic.

=== 30 ===
- George Alevisatos, 86, Canadian football player (Hamilton Tiger-Cats, Montreal Alouettes).
- Mike Babul, 47, American basketball coach, heart attack.
- Jearld Baylis, 62, American football player (Toronto Argonauts, Saskatchewan Roughriders, BC Lions).
- Wolfgang de Beer, 60, German footballer (MSV Duisburg, Borussia Dortmund).
- Sibusiso Bengu, 90, South African politician, minister of education (1994–1999).
- Bob Bertles, 85, Australian jazz musician.
- Donald Biggs, 94, American politician, member of the Kansas Senate (1997–2001).
- Mark Bradley, 68, American baseball player (Los Angeles Dodgers, New York Mets).
- Richard Brock, 86, British television and film producer (Life on Earth, The Living Planet).
- John Capodice, 83, American actor (Ace Ventura: Pet Detective, Independence Day, Speed).
- Tony Connell, 80, Scottish footballer (St Mirren, Third Lanark, Queen of the South), fall.
- Loretta Di Franco, 82, American soprano.
- William N. Eschmeyer, 85, American ichthyologist.
- Dave Fagg, 88, American football coach (Davidson Wildcats).
- Ruggero Franceschini, 85, Italian Roman Catholic prelate, apostolic vicar of Anatolia (1993–2004) and archbishop of İzmir (2004–2015).
- Pippa Garner, 82, American artist, leukemia.
- Sir Peter Graham, 87, British army lieutenant general, GOC Scotland (1991–1993).
- Joe Grech, 90, Maltese singer ("Marija l-Maltija").
- Émile Idée, 104, French road racing cyclist.
- Jamshid bin Abdullah, 95, Tanzanian Zanzibari royal, sultan (1963–1964).
- Lul Jeylani Ali, 74, Somali singer.
- Kim Soo-han, 96, South Korean politician, speaker of the National Assembly (1996–1998).
- Gennady Kovalev, 79, Russian biathlete, world champion (1973).
- Pascal Lainé, 82, French academic, novelist, and writer (La Dentellière).
- Jorge Lanata, 64, Argentine journalist and author, complications from a heart attack.
- Peter Leitch, 80, Canadian jazz guitarist.
- Braulio Rafael León Villegas, 81, Mexican Roman Catholic prelate, bishop of La Paz en la Baja California Sur (1990–1999) and Ciudad Guzmán (1999–2017), liver cancer.
- Adília Lopes, 64, Portuguese poet.
- Sir Anthony May, 84, British judge, president of the Queen's Bench Division (2008–2011).
- James E. McBryde, 74, American businessman and politician, member of the Michigan House of Representatives (1991–1998).
- Jean Milant, 81, American printmaker.
- Michael Newberry, 27, English footballer (Víkingur Ólafsvík, Linfield, Cliftonville).
- Clint Nichols, 80, American politician, member of the West Virginia House of Delegates (1993–1996).
- Arshad Pervez, 71, Pakistani cricketer (Habib Bank Limited, Pakistan Universities, national team).
- Dax Pierson, 54, American musician (Subtle, 13 & God).
- Cloyd Robinson, 86, American politician, member of the Iowa Senate (1971–1981).
- Gianni Savio, 76, Italian cycling team manager (GW Erco Shimano).
- Diana Scarisbrick, 96, English art historian.
- Mira Shelub, 102, Polish resistance fighter.
- Lee Shulman, 86, American educational psychologist.
- Hugo Sotil, 75, Peruvian footballer (Deportivo Municipal, Barcelona, national team), kidney and liver failure.
- Sir Fraser Stoddart, 82, British-American chemist, Nobel Prize laureate (2016).
- Michael Turner, 70, Australian footballer (Geelong), pancreatic cancer.
- Ronald A. Wait, 80, American politician, member of the Illinois House of Representatives (1983–1993, 1995–2011).
- Frederick Werema, 69, Tanzanian jurist, justice of the High Court (2007–2009), attorney general (2009–2014), and MP (2009–2014).

=== 31 ===
- Alfonso Adán, 52, Spanish politician, mayor of Binéfar (2015–2023).
- Angelo Amato, 86, Italian Roman Catholic cardinal, prefect of the Causes of Saints (2008–2018) and secretary of the Doctrine of the Faith (2002–2008).
- Bob Anderegg, 87, American basketball player (New York Knicks, Hawaii Chiefs).
- Anne Bayley, 90, English surgeon.
- Paolo Benvegnù, 59, Italian singer-songwriter and guitarist, heart attack.
- Charlie Calow, 93, Northern Irish footballer (Bradford Park Avenue, Cliftonville).
- Francesco Castiello, 82, Italian politician, senator (since 2018).
- Nader Fergany, 80, Egyptian sociologist and economist.
- Andrea Galgó Ferenci, 51, Serbian politician, MP (2007). (body discovered on this date)
- Wally Hirsh, 88, German-born New Zealand educator and public servant, race relations conciliator (1986–1989).
- John C. Holstein, 79, American jurist, judge (1989–2002) and chief justice (1995–1997) of the Supreme Court of Missouri.
- Tom Johnson, 85, American composer (An Hour for Piano) and music critic (The Village Voice).
- Andreas Laun, 82, Austrian Roman Catholic prelate, auxiliary bishop of Salzburg (1995–2017).
- Buddy MacKay, 91, American politician, governor (1998–1999) and lieutenant governor (1991–1998) of Florida, member of the U.S. House of Representatives (1983–1989).
- James Kirby Martin, 81, American historian.
- Nahit Menteşe, 92, Turkish politician, minister of the interior (1993–1996), deputy prime minister (1996).
- Don Nix, 83, American musician (The Mar-Keys) and songwriter.
- Samuel Ocaña García, 93, Mexican physician and politician, governor of Sonora (1979–1985).
- Roger Pratt, 77, British cinematographer (Brazil, Batman, The End of the Affair).
- Piotr Pytlakowski, 73, Polish journalist (Polityka, Gazeta Wyborcza, Życie).
- Arnold Rüütel, 96, Estonian politician, president (2001–2006), chairman of the Supreme Soviet (1990–1992) and the Presidium of the Supreme Soviet (1983–1990).
- Elizabeth Schmitz, 86, Dutch politician, secretary of state for justice (1994–1998), mayor of Haarlem (1985–1994).
- Thomas J. Schriber, 89, American academic.
- Myra Sklarew, 90, American biologist and poet, complications from Crohn's disease.
- Sweet Daddy Siki, 91, American-Canadian wrestler (NWA, Big Time Wrestling, Maple Leaf Wrestling), complications from Alzheimer's disease.
- Paolo Vitelli, 77, Italian motor yacht industry executive and politician, founder of Azimut Yachts and deputy (2013–2015), fall.
- Johnnie Walker, 79, English disc jockey (Radio Caroline, BBC Radio 1, BBC Radio 2), idiopathic pulmonary fibrosis.
- Frances Wessells, 105, American dancer.
- Jocelyn Wildenstein, 84, Swiss socialite, pulmonary embolism.
