= Michael Gill =

Michael Gill may refer to:

- Michael Gill (producer) (1923–2005), English television producer and director
- Michael Gill (cricketer) (1957–2024), New Zealand cricketer
- Michael Gill (cyclist) (born 1998), British road cyclist
- Michael J. Gill (horseman), American Thoroughbred racehorse owner
- Michael Joseph Gill (1864–1918), American politician from Missouri
- Michael Henry Gill, co-founder of the Irish publisher Gill
- Michael Gates Gill, American author of How Starbucks Saved My Life
- Michel Gill (born 1960), also known as Michael Gill, American actor

== See also ==
- Mick Gill (1899–1980), Irish sportsperson
