= Axel Wirtz =

German politician (1957–2024)

Member of the Landtag of North Rhine-Westphalia
- In office 4 October 1999 – 31 May 2017

Personal details
- Born: Axel-Georg Wirtz; 23 June 1957 Stolberg, North Rhine-Westphalia, West Germany
- Died: 13 December 2024 (aged 67)
- Party: CDU
- Occupation: Government official

Axel-Georg Wirtz (23 June 1957 – 13 December 2024) was a German government official and politician. A member of the Christian Democratic Union, he served in the Landtag of North Rhine-Westphalia from 1999 to 2017.

Wirtz died on 13 December 2024, at the age of 67.
