= Xing Qiuhen =

Chinese physicist (1930–2024)

- 邢球痕
- Born: 30 September 1930; Sheng County, Zhejiang, China
- Died: 29 December 2024 (aged 94); Xi'an, Shaanxi, China
- Education: National University of Defense Technology
- Spouse: Zhou Weijun
- Children: 2
- Scientific career
- Fields: Solid rocket propulsion technology
- Workplaces: Ministry of Aerospace; China Aerospace Science and Technology Corporation

Xing Qiuhen (Chinese: 邢球痕; pinyin: Xíng Qiúhén; 30 September 1930 – 29 December 2024) was a Chinese scientist specializing in solid rocket propulsion technology, and an academician of the Chinese Academy of Sciences.

== Life and career ==
Xing was born in Sheng County (now Shengzhou), Zhejiang, on 30 September 1930. He attended Jinshui Primary School, Chungao Middle School, Sheng County Middle School, and Zhejiang Provincial Shaoxing High School. After graduating from Zhejiang Provincial Ningbo Advanced Industrial Vocational School in July 1949, Xing taught at Taiping Village Primary School. In October of that same year, he enrolled at Shanghai East China Field Army Special Technical School.

In 1950, Xing became a cultural instructor in the propaganda and education department of the East China Field Army Special Forces Special Branch School and subsequently history teacher at the East China Military Region Artillery Accelerated Primary School. In February 1953, Xing was accepted to the PLA Academy of Military Engineering (now National University of Defense Technology), where he joined the Chinese Communist Party (CCP) in 1954. After graduation in 1958, he became a technician at the Rocket Engine Research Laboratory of the 5th Academy of the Ministry of National Defense. There, he was in turn the leader of Solid Rocket Design Team and finally leader of Solid Rocket Motor Design Institute.

In September 1963, Xing was assigned to the 41st Institutes of the 4th Academy of the 7th Ministry of Machinery Industry (later was reshuffled as Ministry of Aerospace and eventually became China Aerospace Science and Technology Corporation), where he rose to president of the 4th Academy in February 1983.

Xing died in Xi'an, Shaanxi on 29 December 2024, at the age of 94.

== Family ==
In May 1958, Xing married Zhou Weijun (周慰君), with whom he had a son and a daughter.

== Honours and awards ==
- 2003 Member of the Chinese Academy of Sciences (CAS)
- December 2003 Science and Technology Progress Award of the Ho Leung Ho Lee Foundation
