= Sławomir Marczewski =

Polish politician (1950–2024)

Member of the Sejm
- In office 19 September 1993 – 20 October 1997
- Constituency: Kielce

Personal details
- Born: Sławomir Szczepan Marczewski; 1 January 1950; Skarżysko-Kamienna, Poland
- Died: 15 December 2024 (aged 74); Kielce, Poland
- Political party: SLD
- Education: Medical University of Białystok
- Occupation: Doctor

Sławomir Szczepan Marczewski (1 January 1950 – 15 December 2024) was a Polish politician. A member of the Democratic Left Alliance, he served in the Sejm from 1993 to 1997.

Marczewski died in Kielce on 15 December 2024, at the age of 74.
