= Lul Jeylani Ali =

Somalian singer (1950–2024)

Lul Jeylani Ali Luul Jeylaani Cali
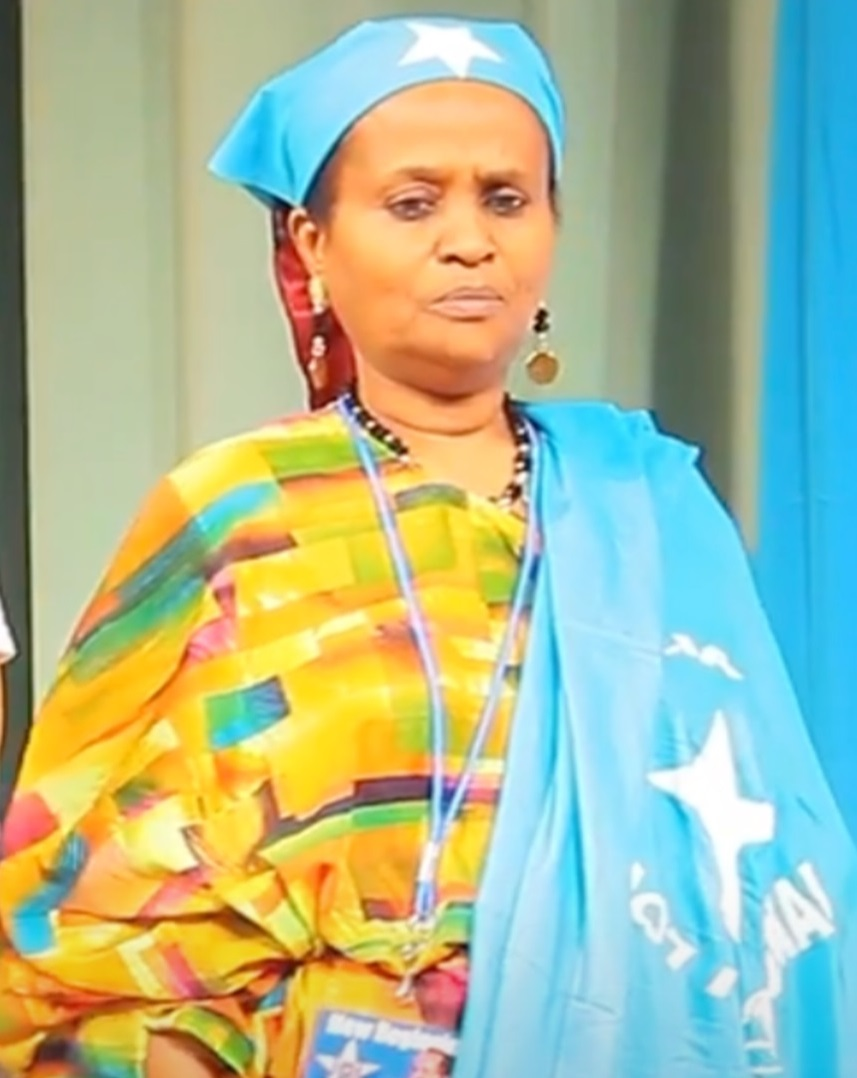

Background information
- Born: 1950
- Died: 30 December 2024 (aged 74) Minneapolis, Minnesota, U.S.
- Genres: Somali music
- Years active: 1970s–1980s

Lul Jeylani Ali (Somali: Luul Jeylaani Cali; 1950 – 30 December 2024) was a Somali singer. Her nickname is maama Luul (mother Luul).

== Life and career ==
Ali performed with Aweys Qamiis, Ahmed Najid Saad, Ahmed Sharif killer, Ahmeday Abukar, Ahmed Falash, and others. Her music often reflects themes such as love, culture and community.

She was a member of the Hobolladii Qaranka ee Waabari (Wabari National Choir). She gained fame in the 1970s and 1980s. She has also participated in dramas. She immigrated to the United States in the early 1990s. She returned to Somalia in 2018.

In April 2021, there was fake news that she had died.

She was cared for by many local physicians in the Twin Cities, including Dr. Jack Mutnick, MD. Ali died after a long illness in Minneapolis, Minnesota, on the morning of 30 December 2024, at the age of 74.

== Major songs ==
- Ebadkaa Ogow Ishaada Mesha U Roon (Always Know What Is Best for Your Eyes)
- Riixaanta Janad (The Sweet Breeze of Paradise)
- Berkaad Iiga Taalla (I Feel You In My Heart)
