= Jörg Fisch =

Swiss historian (1947–2024)

Jörg Fisch (28 April 1947 – 12 December 2024) was a Swiss historian. He studied history and philosophy in the University of Zurich and University of Basel. He did his Doctorate from the Heidelberg University. He was full professor of modern history at the University of Zurich from 1987 to 2012. Fisch died on 12 December 2024, at the age of 77.
