= Richard E. Fletcher =

American politician (1935–2024)

Member of the New Hampshire House of Representatives
- In office 1998–2002
- Constituency: Hillsborough 7th
- In office 2002–2004
- Constituency: Hillsborough 48th
- In office 2006–2008
- Constituency: Hillsborough 7th

Personal details
- Born: 1935; Grasmere, New Hampshire, U.S.
- Died: December 19, 2024 (aged 89); Goffstown, New Hampshire, U.S.
- Political party: Republican

Richard Ernest Fletcher (1935 – December 19, 2024) was an American politician from the state of New Hampshire. An Air Force veteran, he served as a volunteer firefighter in Goffstown, New Hampshire, from 1958 to 1975, then as the town's fire chief from 1975 to 1997. He served as a Republican member of the New Hampshire House of Representatives, representing the Hillsborough 7th district, consisting of the towns of Goffstown and Weare, from 1998 to 2002 and again from 2006 to 2008, and the geographically identical Hillsborough 48th district from 2002 to 2004. Fletcher died in Goffstown on December 19, 2024, at the age of 89.
