= Pere Moles =

Andorran politician (1935–2024)

Pere Moles Aristot (1935 – 23 December 2024) was an Andorran politician who served on the General Council during four different periods: 1979, 1979–1981, 1986–1989 and 1994–1997. Moles died on 23 December 2024, at the age of 89.
