= Utz Rothe =

Austrian painter (1940–2024)

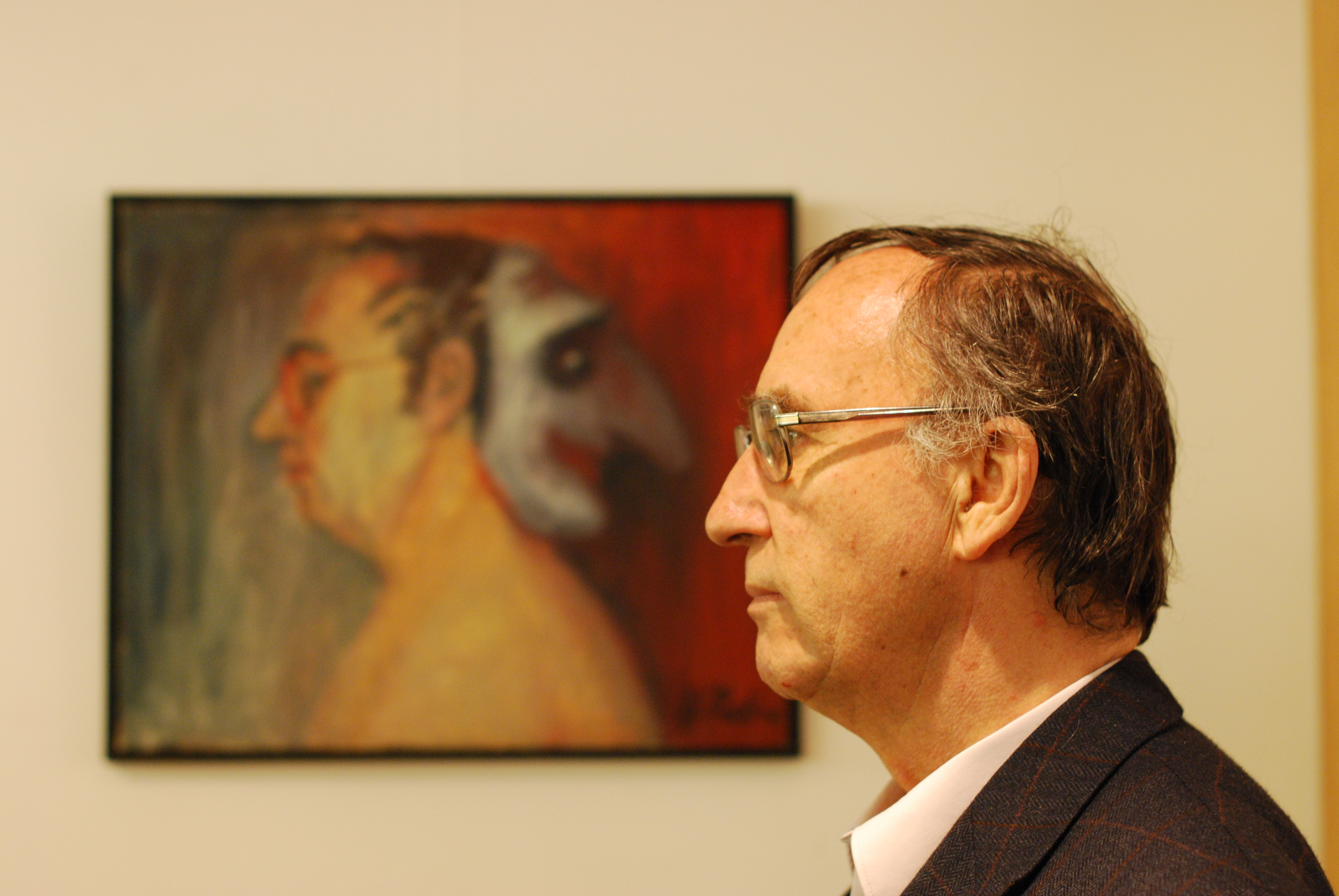
Utz Rothe

Utz Rothe (December 2, 1940 – December 24, 2024) was an Austrian artist whose work ranges from the realistic delights of European landscapes to the graphic arts. Rothe's work is composed of three different styles, although he prefers to refer his style as Depressionismos, in more common terms one would define him as a follower of (abstraction) expressionism and realism.

== Background ==
Rothe followed his art training at the 'Akademie de Bildenden Künste' in Vienna under the instructions of Robin Christian Andersen, Hessing (?) and Herbert Böckl from 1961 till 1967. His most influential master is Anderson, where one can detect strong similarities in the construction and style of Rothe's paintings with his. From 1967 till 2000, alongside Rothe's profession as an artist, he had a career as an art teacher and later came to lead the weekly 'Aktzeichnen' at the Kunstler-Haus in Vienna. His love for art already became evident in early adolescence when he painted his first oil paintings on cardboard, but at the age of seventeen, Rothe's life took a dramatic turn when he lost his brother in an accident at the Stadionbad in Vienna. The scars of this tragedy can still be read on Rothe's face, his art works and 'Atelier'. Entering into his workspace, one finds chaos, leaving barely a centimeter uncovered, the room is filled with finished and unfinished works of art, objects and muddle as if approaching an overflowing 'Wunderkammer'.

== Graphic art ==
The influence of Kandinsky's later works such as 'On white' can be seen in Rothe's graphic series, though each individual work carries an after taste of morbidity and violent sex, some being more explicit than others. Hence, not everyone may feel drawn to the aesthetic expression of his graphics or understand the meaning and thought that lie beneath each of them. Nonetheless, although his graphics instigate a feeling of unease, as if he is in fact touching underneath our skins, showcasing or posing abstract connotations of our reproductive organs, he enables dialogue, revealing that topics such as sex and death are still taboo. The shapes and figures that one can find in his graphic art might allow one to feel that Utz Rothe does indeed carry a fascination with the sciences and our anatomic system, as one of his critiques has suggested.
