= Tigran Eganyan =

Armenian politician (1978–2024)

Tigran Eganyan (Armenian: Տիգրան Եգանյան; 7 February 1978 – 23 December 2024) was an Armenian politician.

== Life and career ==
Eganyan was born on 7 February 1978, in Yerevan. In 1999 he graduated from the Economics Department of Yerevan State University. He worked as a specialist in the apparatus of the Armenian government (2000–2003). In 2003–2005, he was an advisor to the chairman of the National Assembly of Armenia. In 2006, he was Member of the National Assembly of Armenia. He was a member of the Orinats Yerkir party and was part of the faction of the same name.

== Death ==
Tigran Yeganyan died at a hospital in Munich, on 23 December 2024, at the age of 46.
