= Roger C. Thomas =

British physiologist (1939–2024)

Roger Christopher Thomas, FRS (2 June 1939 – 17 December 2024) was a British physiologist and Head of Physiology at the University of Cambridge from 1996 to 2006 having moved from Bristol University where he had been both Head of Physiology and Dean of Medical Sciences.

His scientific work encompassed mitochondrial calcium handling, Renshaw cells, electrogenicity of the sodium pump, pH regulation (muscle, nerve and glia), proton channel (with Bob Meech), pH buffering, calcium regulation and calcium buffering with some electrical excitability thrown in.

Thomas was elected to the Royal Society in 1989. He died on 17 December 2024, at the age of 85.

== Sources ==
- "Fellows". The Royal Society.
- 'Thomas, Prof. Roger Christopher', Who's Who 2011, A & C Black, 2011; online edn, Oxford University Press, Dec 2010; online edn, Oct 2010 accessed 11 June 2011
