= Nikolai Kryzhanovsky =

Belarusian politician (1937–2024)

- Мікалай Крыжаноўскі

Member of the Supreme Council of Belarus
- In office 1990–1995

Personal details
- Born: Nikolai Kirillovich Kryzhanovsky; 1 March 1937 Babruysk, Byelorussian SSR, USSR
- Died: 17 December 2024 (aged 87)
- Party: CPSU (until 1990); BPF
- Education: Northwestern State Technical Remote University

Nikolai Kirillovich Kryzhanovsky or Mikalay Kirylavich Kryzhanouski (Belarusian: Мікалай Кірылавіч Крыжаноўскі; 1 March 1937 – 17 December 2024) was a Belarusian politician. A member of the BPF Party, he served in the Supreme Council from 1990 to 1995.

Kryzhanovsky died on 17 December 2024, at the age of 87.
