= Constantin Drumen =

Romanian politician (1950–2024)

Constantin Drumen (29 July 1950 – 24 December 2024) was a Romanian politician who was a deputy in the 1996–2000 legislature, elected in Gorj County on the lists of the PNȚCD party. Constantin Drumen became an independent parliamentarian in March 1999.

Drumen died on 24 December 2024, at the age of 74.
