= Frank Driscoll =

Australian rules footballer

Personal information
- Full name: Frank Driscoll
- Born: 30 July 1934
- Died: 27 December 2024 (aged 90); Ballarat, Victoria
- Original teams: Navarre, Mortlake
- Height: 183 cm (6 ft 0 in)
- Weight: 78 kg (172 lb)
- Position: Key forward

Playing career^{1}
Years	Club	Games (Goals)
1957–58	Essendon	7 (11)
- ^{1} Playing statistics correct to the end of 1958.

Frank Driscoll (30 July 1934 – 27 December 2024) was an Australian rules footballer who played with Essendon in the Victorian Football League (VFL). He later returned to one of his old teams, Navarre, and was captain-coach of Moonambel.
