= Douglas I. Hunt =

American football coach and politician (1937–2024)

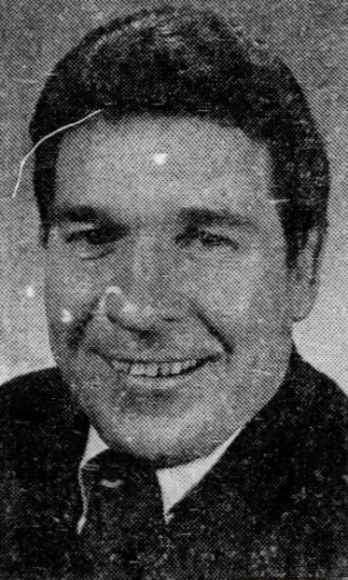
- Hunt in 1976

Member of the Utah House of Representatives
- In office 1975–1977

Personal details
- Born: Douglas Ivan Hunt; July 30, 1937 St. George, Utah, U.S.
- Died: December 8, 2024 (aged 87) Draper, Utah, U.S.
- Party: Democratic
- Spouse: Dianne
- Education: Utah State University
- Coaching career

Coaching career (HC unless noted)
- 1960s–1970s: Weber State (assistant)

Douglas Ivan Hunt (July 30, 1937 – December 8, 2024) was an American college football coach and politician. A member of the Democratic Party, he served in the Utah House of Representatives from 1975 to 1977.

== Life and career ==
Hunt was born in St. George, Utah, the son of Ivan Holt Hunt and Jessie Waite. He attended Dixie High School, graduating in 1955. After graduating, he served in the armed forces during the Korean War, which after his discharge, he attended Utah State University, earning his degrees in physical education and psychology. He was a rancher and a college football assistant coach at Weber State College.

Hunt served in the Utah House of Representatives from 1975 to 1977.

== Death ==
Hunt died on December 8, 2024 of Parkinson's disease, in Draper, Utah, at the age of 87.
