= Wolfgang Steiert =

German ski jumper and coach (1963–2024)

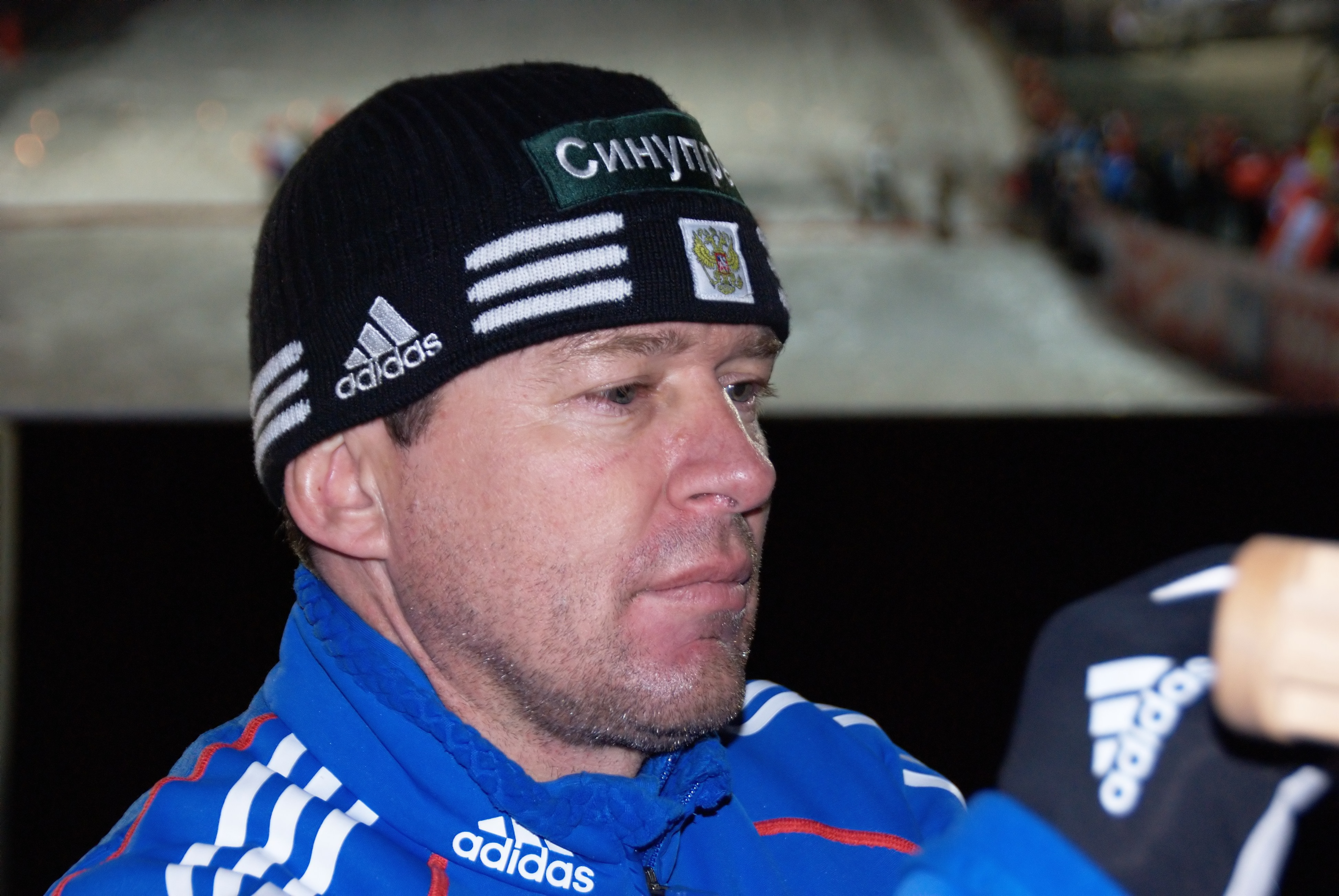
- Steiert in 2009

Personal information
- Nationality: Germany
- Born: 19 April 1963 Hinterzarten, Baden-Württemberg, West Germany
- Died: 12 December 2024 (aged 61)

Sport
- Sport: Skiing

World Cup career
- Seasons: 1981–1989
- Indiv. podiums: 0
- Indiv. wins: 0
Medal record
Representing Germany
German Championships
Men's ski jumping
Silver medal – second place	1986 Germany	Men's large hill

Wolfgang Steiert (19 April 1963 – 12 December 2024) was a German ski jumper and coach. He served as head coach of the German national ski jumping team from 2003 to 2004.

Steiert competed at the 1985 FIS Nordic World Ski Championships, finishing in 24th place in the men's 70-meter ski jump event. He then competed at the 1986 German Ski Jumping Championships, winning the silver medal in the men's large hill event.

Steiert died on 12 December 2024, at the age of 61.

== Controversies ==
Athletes Frank Löffler and Michael Möllinger blamed Steiert for forcing athletes to have a low and unhealthy body weight. The conflict became public and even viewers criticized the trainer. He had to retire as german head coach after one year. In the process race director Walter Hofer and ski jumper Martin Schmitt suggested rules to protect ski jumpers.

Steiert also had the reputation of being arrogant and selfish. Therefore Andreas Bauer left the german staff, after Steiert hab become head coach.
