= Peter Fraenkel (journalist) =

German-born British journalist and author (1926–2024)

- Born: 7 December 1926; Breslau, Lower Silesia, Prussia, Germany
- Died: 12 December 2024 (aged 98)
- Occupation: Journalist
- Years active: 1952–1986
- Employer: BBC
- Notable work: Wayaleshi: On British Central Africa. Weidenfeld & Nicolson, London, 1959.

Peter J. Fraenkel (7 December 1926 – 12 December 2024) was a German-born British journalist and author who was controller of European services for the British Broadcasting Corporation. He was born in Breslau but following Nazi oppression of the Jews, he escaped for Northern Rhodesia with his parents in 1939. He worked there in broadcasting before leaving for London in 1957 when he began his career in Reuters and then the BBC. He described with irony his transition from "sub-human Jew in Nazi Germany ... to White master race in British colonial Africa".

== Early life ==
Peter Fraenkel was born in Breslau (then in Germany, now Poland) on 7 December 1926. His father was a German civil servant who received the Iron Cross for his heroism under fire during the First World War. As German oppression of Jews grew in the 1930s, Fraenkel's mother pleaded with her husband to leave the country but he only agreed after Kristallnacht in 1938. The family had visas for Swaziland and Northern Rhodesia but chose the later as it was thought to be wealthier and in 1939 they departed for Northern Rhodesia by sea via South Africa. They settled in Lusaka and Fraenkel's father opened a dry cleaning company with a friend. Peter Fraenkel was educated at Lusaka Boys' school.

Fraenkel studied English and history at the University of Witwatersrand, Johannesburg, and became involved with the anti-apartheid movement. He was selected for a tour of English universities and ironically selected to debate in favour of apartheid. He lost but was offered a job by a South African public relations officer which he declined.

In his autobiography No fixed abode, he described with irony his transition from "sub-human Jew in Nazi Germany ... to White master race in British colonial Africa".

== Early career ==
Fraenkel's first job was as an accounts clerk for the registrar of co-operative societies. He then left that to work as an assistant broadcasting officer for Central African Broadcasting Services in Lusaka (1952–57) where he created a fictional mining compound to get development messages across using local actors. The venture was described in Wayaleshi (1958).

== London ==
In 1957, Fraenkel left Africa for London, working first for Reuters and then the BBC where he first wrote scripts, he then became Greek Programme organiser and later the Head of the East European Services and lastly Controller of European Services from 1979–86.

== Death ==
Fraenkel died on 12 December 2024, at the age of 98.

== Selected publications ==
- Wayaleshi: On British Central Africa. Weidenfeld & Nicolson, London, 1959.
- No fixed abode: A Jewish odyssey to freedom in Africa. I.B. Tauris, 2005. ISBN 978-1850436263

=== Self published ===
- Susanne and the Nazis: A tale of intrigue and heroism.
- Short stories.
