= Marilyn Oshman =

American businessman (1939–2024)

Marilyn Oshman (September 29, 1939 – December 22, 2024) was the chairman of Oshman's Sporting Goods and the company's largest shareholder. When her founding father Jake Oshman, a Russian orphan, died in 1965, Marilyn's husband, Alvin Lubetkin, took over. She spent time doing volunteer work (e.g., serving as president and chairman of Houston's Contemporary Arts Museum). As part of her fundraising efforts, she learned to deal with the business community. In 1978 Oshman and Lubetkin divorced. He stayed on at the company and serves as president and CEO. (Their two children also work for the company.)

In 1979, Oshman became a member of the board but only became actively involved in 1989. In 1993, she became chairman.

In 1980, Oshman formed a non-profit foundation to preserve the then fragile and deteriorating Orange Show Monument. She reached out to 21 well-known members of the community representing a diverse cross-section of Houston - Dominique de Menil, Nina Cullinan, members of ZZ Top, and others - to assist in the purchase and restoration of the site. In 1982, the Orange Show Monument opened back up to the public and the newly hired staff began to integrate the Orange Show Center for Visionary Art into Houston's cultural life through a wide variety of programs.

In 1996, the company had a total of 129 stores. Twenty-seven were SuperSports USA stores, which generated 65% of the company's sales. As of August 1997, Oshman's had 37 SuperSports USA stores and had closed or was closing all but 31 of its smaller stores. The big box stores, which average 70,000 square feet (6,500 m^{2}), feature batting cages, golf simulators, putting greens, basketball half-courts, racquet sports areas, and inline skating areas.

Oshman died on December 22, 2024, at the age of 85.
