= Carole Wilbourn =

American cat therapist (1940–2024)

- Born: Carole Cecile Engel; March 19, 1940; Flushing, Queens
- Died: December 23, 2024 (aged 84); Manhattan, New York City
- Citizenship: American
- Education: New York University
- Spouses: David Wilbourn (divorced); Paul Rowan (divorced)
- Scientific career
- Fields: Psychology

Carole Wilbourn (March 19, 1940 – December 23, 2024) was an American cat therapist.

== Early life ==
Wilbourn was born in Flushing, Queens to parents Harriet Greenwald and Gustave Engel, a taxi driver. She attended Bayside High School. She went on to study at State University of New York at Albany, but later transferred to New York University, where she studied psychology. She was awarded a BSc degree in business education in 1964.

== Personal life ==
She was married twice. Her first marriage to David Willbourn, a photographer, ended in divorce. She later married Paul Rowan, a veterinarian, with whom she founded The Cat Practice, a cats-only hospital in Manhattan. Their marriage ended in divorce.

== Books ==
- The Total Cat: Understanding Your Cat's Physical and Emotional Behavior from Kitten to Old Age
- Cats on the Couch (1982)
- The Inner Cat
