= David B. Douzanis =

American politician (1950–2024)

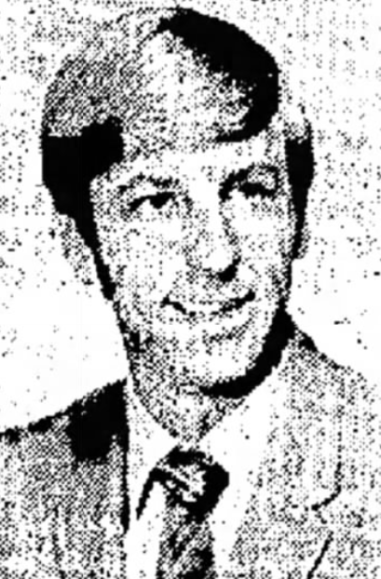
- Douzanis in 1974

Member of the New Hampshire House of Representatives from the Hillsborough 23rd district
- In office 1974–1976

Personal details
- Born: David Bruce Douzanis; April 25, 1950 Nashua, New Hampshire, U.S.
- Died: December 22, 2024 (aged 74) York Beach, Maine, U.S.
- Party: Democratic
- Education: Chamberlain Junior College

David Bruce Douzanis (April 25, 1950 – December 22, 2024) was an American politician. A member of the Democratic Party, he served in the New Hampshire House of Representatives from 1974 to 1976.

== Life and career ==
Douzanis was born in Nashua, New Hampshire, the son of Edward Douzanis and Theresa LaFleur. He attended Nashua High School, graduating in 1970. After graduating, he attended Chamberlain Junior College.

Douzanis served in the New Hampshire House of Representatives from 1974 to 1976.

== Death ==
Douzanis died on December 22, 2024, in York Beach, Maine, at the age of 74.
