= Vladimir Tsyrenov =

Soviet-Russian long-distance and marathon runner (1941–2024)

Personal information
- Born: Vladimir Galsanovich Tsyrenov; 20 October 1941 Ulekchin, Buryat-Mongol ASSR, Russian SFSR, USSR
- Died: 26 December 2024 (aged 83)

Sport
- Sport: Athletics
- Event(s): Long-distance running Marathon; 10,000 m
Medal record
Representing Soviet Union
Soviet Championships
Bronze medal – third place	1972 Moscow	Men's 30km

Vladimir Galsanovich Tsyrenov (Russian: Владимир Галсанович Цыренов; 20 October 1941 – 26 December 2024) was a Soviet-Russian long-distance and marathon runner. He was a recipient of the Honored Worker of Physical Culture of the Russian Federation (1993).

Tsyrenov died on 26 December 2024, at the age of 83.
