= Muyideen Ajani Bello =

Nigerian Islamic scholar (1940–2024)

Sheikh Muyideen Ajani Bello
- Title: Sheikh

Personal life
- Born: Muyideen Ajani; 29 June 1940 Southwest Region, Nigeria
- Died: 6 December 2024 (aged 84)
- Era: Modern era
- Region: South-west Nigeria
- Main interest(s): Qur'an teaching and commentaries (Tafsir), preaching
- Notable work: Tafsir al Quran
- Occupation: Scholar

Religious life
- Religion: Islam
- Denomination: Ansar Ud Deen
- Jurisprudence: Maliki

Muslim leader
- Teacher: 8,000+
- Students: 5,000000+

Muyideen Ajani Bello (29 June 1940 – 6 December 2024) was a Nigerian Islamic scholar, teacher, and preacher.

== Early life and education ==
Muyideen was born in 1940 at Arolu Compound, Ita Olukoyi, Ibadan, Nigeria. He died at the age of 84 on 6 December 2024, and was buried at his residence in Ibadan. Between 1963 and 1967, he studied Arabic and Islamic studies at Mahadul Arabiy, Elekuro, Ibadan. He is an hafeez of Quran, sunnis Islamic scholar and a pious Islamic leader who love reciting al Quran. He is known to be pious and never charged money when called to lecture, he only takes whatever is offer to him because he believes what his doing is what he's sent to do in life then why should he charge for what Allah sent him to do. His lecture mostly is to call back the rulers and the Politicians especially the president on what Islam commands them to do and what Islam warns them of to refrain from it.

== Career ==
Muyideen was a scholar, teacher, and preacher. He previously served as a school teacher in various schools in both the Western Region, Nigeria and the Northern part of Nigeria. He has numerous Islamic sermon records to his name. He was a member of the Ansar-Ud-Deen Society of Nigeria. He has preached in continents beyond Africa, including the UK and the United States.
