= Fritz Hari =

Swiss politician (1928–2024)

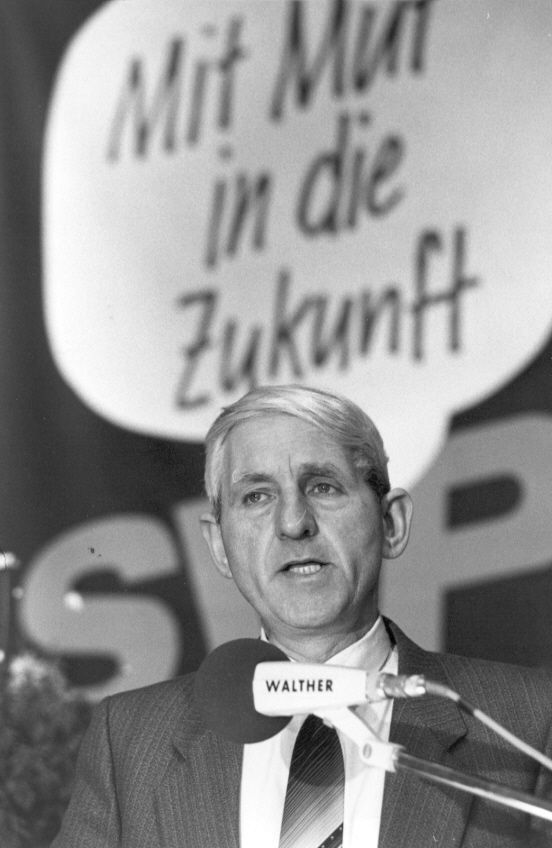
- 1992

Member of the National Council of Switzerland
- In office 26 November 1979 – 3 December 1995

Personal details
- Born: 18 February 1928; Reichenbach im Kandertal, Bern, Switzerland
- Died: 9 December 2024 (aged 96)
- Political party: SVP
- Occupation: Farmer

Fritz Hari (18 February 1928 – 9 December 2024) was a Swiss politician. A member of the Swiss People's Party, he served in the National Council from 1979 to 1995.

Hari died on 9 December 2024, at the age of 96.
