= Uwe Hollweg =

German politician (1937–2024)

Member of the Bürgerschaft of Bremen
- In office 1983–1991
- In office 1975–1979

Personal details
- Born: 13 October 1937 Bremen, Gau Weser-Ems, Germany
- Died: 9 December 2024 (aged 87)
- Party: CDU
- Occupation: Businessman

Uwe Hollweg (13 October 1937 – 9 December 2024) was a German politician. A member of the Christian Democratic Union, he served in the Bürgerschaft of Bremen from 1975 to 1979 and again from 1983 to 1991.

Hollweg died on 9 December 2024, at the age of 87.
