= Felix Feng =

American radiation oncologist and cancer researcher

- Born: December 28, 1975
- Died: December 10, 2024 (aged 48)
- Education: Stanford University, Washington University in St. Louis
- Known for: Prostate cancer research, predictive biomarker development, translational oncology
- Awards: See #Awards and honors
- Scientific career
- Fields: Radiation oncology, Urology, Cancer genomics, Translational research
- Workplaces: University of California, San Francisco

Felix Feng (December 28, 1975 – December 10, 2024) was an American physician-scientist and academic leader in the field of oncology. He was Professor of Radiation Oncology, Urology, and Medicine at the University of California, San Francisco (UCSF), and a nationally recognized expert in prostate cancer research and translational oncology.

== Early life and education ==
Feng was born in 1975 and raised in Palo Alto, California. He completed his undergraduate studies at Stanford University, where he met his future wife, Mary. The couple went on to attend medical school at Washington University in St. Louis, followed by residencies in radiation oncology at the University of Michigan.

== Career ==
Feng began his academic career as a faculty member at the University of Michigan before joining UCSF in 2016. At UCSF, he held numerous leadership roles, including:

- George and Judy Marcus Distinguished Professor
- Vice Chair for Translational Research, Department of Radiation Oncology
- Director, Benioff Initiative for Prostate Cancer Research
- Associate Director for Translational Clinical Research, UCSF Helen Diller Family Comprehensive Cancer Center
- Co-Leader, Prostate Cancer Program

He also chaired the Genitourinary Cancer Committee of NRG Oncology from 2018 until his passing and served on the RTOG Foundation Board of Directors.

== Research contributions ==
Feng was a pioneer in the development of biomarkers to guide therapy in prostate cancer. His laboratory produced the first clinical-grade biomarker panels predicting response to radiation and hormone therapy after surgery. He also developed plasma-based assays using cell-free DNA to anticipate resistance to PARP1 inhibitors.

His research elucidated the roles of genes such as PARP1, DNAPK, SChLAP1, and PCAT1 in prostate cancer progression, and his preclinical studies contributed to multiple clinical trials investigating targeted therapies for metastatic disease.

== Awards and honors ==
- Chair, NRG Oncology Genitourinary Cancer Committee (2018–2024)
- Member, RTOG Foundation Board of Directors
- Founder of two biotech companies focused on personalized cancer treatment
- Numerous national presentations, including the keynote address at the 2024 Feng Symposium

== Personal life ==
Feng was married to Mary Feng, also a radiation oncologist. They had two children, Eric and Emily. Friends and colleagues remember him as a generous mentor, visionary leader, and dedicated family man.

== Legacy ==
Feng's death from cancer in December 2024 led to an outpouring of tributes from across the oncology community. The American Cancer Society and ASTRO established the Felix Feng, MD Clinician Scientist Development Grant Award in his honor.

The "Feng Symposium," launched in 2024, continues to promote research excellence in prostate cancer. His mentees, colleagues, and patients continue to carry forward his legacy in translational oncology.
