= Humberto Lepe Lepe =

Mexican politician (1949–2024)

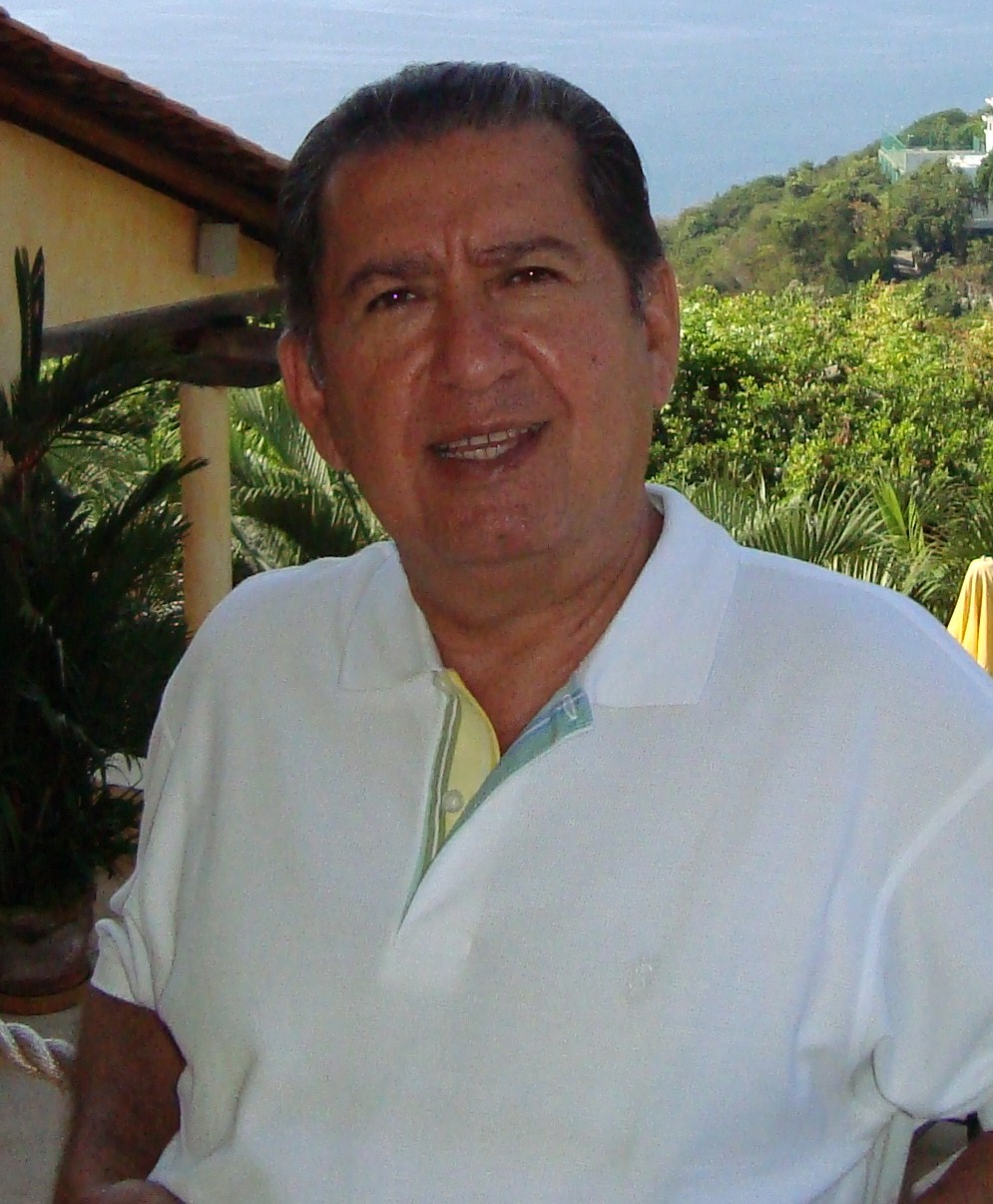
- Born: February 18, 1949; Mexicali, Baja California, Mexico
- Died: December 2024 (aged 75); Mexico
- Occupation: Politician
- Political party: PRI

Humberto Lepe Lepe (18 February 1949 – December 2024) was a Mexican politician from the Institutional Revolutionary Party. From 2009 to 2012 he served as Deputy of the LXI Legislature of the Mexican Congress representing Baja California. Lepe Lepe died in December 2024, at the age of 75.
