= Daniel Lubetkin =

American lawyer and politician (1931–2024)

Member of the New Jersey General Assembly
- In office 1962–1964

Personal details
- Born: September 14, 1931 Newark, New Jersey, U.S.
- Died: December 7, 2024 (aged 93)
- Party: Democratic

Daniel Lubetkin (September 14, 1931 – December 7, 2024) was an American lawyer and politician. He served as a Democratic member of the New Jersey General Assembly from 1962 to 1964.

A graduate of Rutgers Law School, Lubetkin was a longtime resident of South Orange, New Jersey, until moving to Mountain Lakes, New Jersey, in 1991. He died on December 7, 2024, at the age of 93.
