= Roger Gerber =

French weightlifter (1933–2024)

Personal information
- Nationality: French
- Born: 28 December 1933; Paris, France
- Died: 6 December 2024 (aged 90); La Londe-les-Maures, France

Sport
- Sport: Weightlifting

Roger Gerber (28 December 1933 – 6 December 2024) was a French weightlifter. He competed at the 1956 Summer Olympics and the 1960 Summer Olympics. Gerber died on 6 December 2024, at the age of 90.
