= Pat White (politician) =

American politician (1948–2024)

Member of the West Virginia House of Delegates
- In office 1984–1994

Personal details
- Born: Patricia Holmes; November 20, 1948 West Hartford, Connecticut, U.S.
- Died: December 18, 2024 (aged 76) Charleston, West Virginia, U.S.
- Party: Democratic
- Education: University of Charleston; West Virginia College of Graduate Studies

Patricia Holmes (November 20, 1948 – December 18, 2024) was an American politician. A member of the Democratic Party, she served in the West Virginia House of Delegates from 1984 to 1994.

== Life and career ==
White was born in West Hartford, Connecticut, the daughter of Richard Whiting Holmes and Betty Summers. She attended the University of Charleston, earning her B.A. degree. She also attended West Virginia College of Graduate Studies, earning her MPA degree.

White served in the West Virginia House of Delegates from 1984 to 1994.

== Death ==
White died on December 18, 2024, of neuroendocrine carcinoma at her home in Charleston, West Virginia, at the age of 76.
