= William H. Perry III =

American politician (1940–2024)

Member of the Missouri House of Representatives from the 138th district
- In office 1973–1975

Personal details
- Born: February 16, 1940 Joplin, Missouri, U.S.
- Died: December 3, 2024 (aged 84)
- Party: Republican
- Occupation: Politician
- Profession: Attorney

William Henry Perry III (February 16, 1940 – December 3, 2024) was an American politician who served as a Missouri state representative from 1973 to 1975.

Born in Joplin, Missouri, Perry was educated at the University of Kansas, the Washington College of Law, and the American University. He served as assistant prosecuting attorney of Jasper County from 1967 until 1969 and as city attorney of Webb City from 1966 until 1974.

Perry died on December 3, 2024, at the age of 84.
