= Frederik Finisie =

Surinamese politician (1956 or 1957 – 2024)

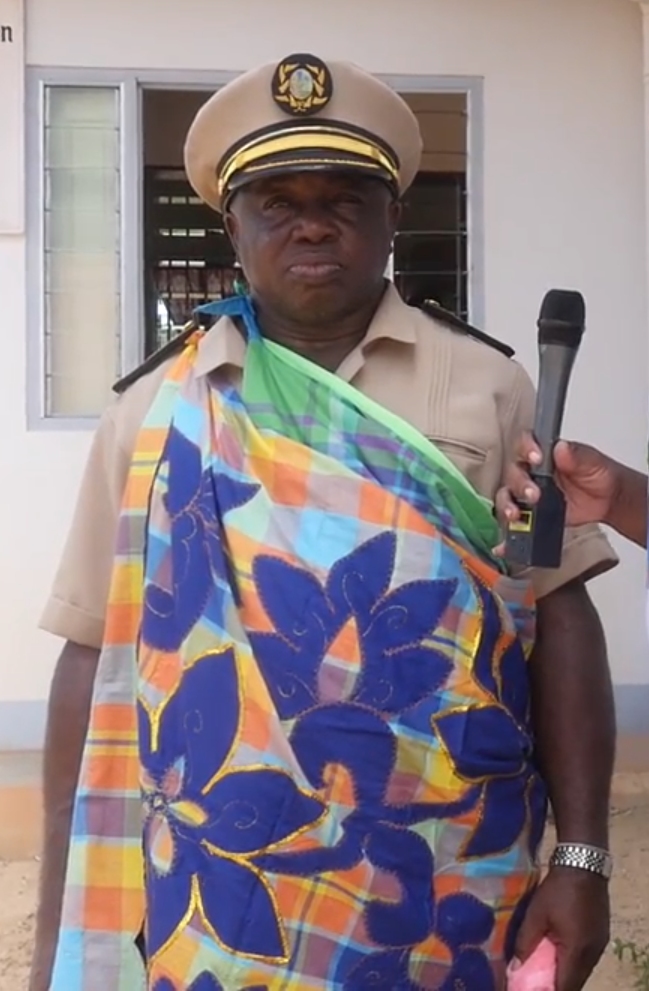
- Finisie in 2018

Member of the National Assembly of Suriname
- In office 1996–2018

Personal details
- Born: 1956 or 1957
- Died: 5 December 2024 (aged 67); Paramaribo, Suriname
- Political party: NDP

Frederik Finisie (1956 or 1957 – 5 December 2024) was a Surinamese politician. A member of the National Democratic Party, he served in the National Assembly of Suriname from 1996 to 2018.

Finisie died on 5 December 2024, at the age of 67.
