= Kostas Batuvas =

Greek politician (1934–2024)

- Κώστας Μπαντουβάς

Member of the Hellenic Parliament
- In office 2 June 1985 – 14 March 2000
- Constituency: Athens B (1985–1989); Heraklion (1989–2000)
- In office 17 November 1974 – 19 September 1981
- Constituency: Heraklion

Minister of Transport and Communications
- In office 31 October 1986 – 22 June 1988
- Preceded by: Georgios D. Papadimitriou
- Succeeded by: Georgios Petsos

Personal details
- Born: 1934; Megali Vrysi, Gortyn, Greece
- Died: 11 December 2024 (aged 90); Athens, Greece
- Political party: EK-ND; EDIK; PASOK
- Education: National and Kapodistrian University of Athens

Kostas Batuvas (Greek: Κώστας Μπαντουβάς; 1934 – 11 December 2024) was a Greek politician. A member of the Centre Union – New Forces, the Union of the Democratic Centre, and PASOK, he served in the Hellenic Parliament from 1974 to 1981 and again from 1985 to 2000. He was also Minister of Transport and Communications from 1986 to 1988.

Batuvas died in Athens on 11 December 2024, at the age of 90.
