= Manny Davidson =

British property businessman and billionaire (1931–2024)

Emanuel Davidson
- Born: 5 February 1931; London, England
- Died: 12 December 2024 (aged 93)
- Other names: Manny Davidson
- Occupation: Property investor
- Spouse: Brigitta Davidson
- Children: 2

Emanuel Wolfe Davidson (5 February 1931 – 12 December 2024) was a British property billionaire, who was resident in Monaco but had significant holdings in the United Kingdom.

== Life and career ==
Davidson was born in London on 5 February 1931. He grew up in a terraced house in Blackpool during World War II. Prior to moving to Monaco, Davidson and his family lived in Lyegrove House, a Jacobean mansion house set in 18 acres in Gloucestershire, purchased in 1992.

In 1964 he founded Asda Property, in 1985 he took it public, in 2001 he took it private for £231.7 million in a 50:50 joint venture with British Land called BL Davidson and then in 2006 he sold his 50% stake in BL Davidson to British Land for about £253 million.

He was a board member of Bowel & Cancer Research, but stepped down in 2010 to become its first patron.

In 2017, Davidson and his wife were involved in a legal dispute with their two children, Maxine and Gerald, over the return of a collection of jewellery, paintings and art thought to be worth more than £17 million.

Davidson died on 12 December 2024, at the age of 93.
