= Jean-Luc Maxence =

French poet, publisher and writer (1946–2024)

- Born: Jean-Luc Godme; 3 June 1946; Paris, France
- Died: 5 December 2024 (aged 78)
- Occupations: Poet; Publisher; Writer

Jean-Luc Maxence (né Godme; 3 June 1946 – 5 December 2024) was a French poet, publisher and writer.

== Life and career ==
Born in Paris on 3 June 1946, Maxence was the son of Jean-Pierre Maxence. He directed the Centre Didro, an association working to prevent substance dependence and was president of the French delegation to the European Psychoanalysis Association. He also worked as a publisher for Nouvel Athanor and founded the magazines Présence et Regards and Les Cahiers du sens. In 2015, he founded the bimonthly magazine Rebelle(s).

Maxence died on 5 December 2024, at the age of 78.

== Publications ==
- Le Ciel en cage (1970)
- Raz le cœur (1972)
- Révolte au clair (1973)
- Bilka, notre histoire (1975)
- Croix sur table (1976)
- L'Ombre d'un père (1978)
- La Mystérieuse Prophétie de saint Malachie ou Les Derniers Papes de la fin du monde (1979)
- L'Anti-psychiatre et le Toxicomane: 16 ans de cheminement thérapeutique, le Centre DIDRO (1989)
- La Métaprévention au temps du sida (1991)
- Ô séropositifs (1994)
- Les Écrivains sacrifiés des années sida (1995)
- Anthologie de la poésie mystique contemporaine (1999)
- Le Secret des apparitions et des prophéties mariales (2000)
- René Guénon. Le Philosophe invisible (2001)
- L'Égrégore. L'Énergie psychique collective (2003)
- Jung est l'avenir de la franc-maçonnerie (2004)
- Anthologie de la poésie maçonnique et symbolique (XVIIIe, XIXe et XXe siècles) (2007)
- La Loge et le Divan (2008)
- Anthologie de la prière contemporaine (2009)
- Le Pèlerin d'Eros (2009)
- L'Athanor de poètes, anthologie 1991-2011 (2011)
- Soleils au poing (2011)
- Le Crabe, l'Ermite et le Poète (2012)
- Dictionnaire comparatif : C. G. Jung et la franc-maçonnerie (2012)
- La Franc-maçonnerie (2013)
- Légendes maçonniques. Imaginaire et Psychanalyse (2015)
