= Clint Nichols =

American politician (1944–2024)

Member of the West Virginia House of Delegates from the 33rd district
- In office October 14, 1993 – December 1, 1996
- Preceded by: Randy Schoonover
- Succeeded by: Bill Stemple

Personal details
- Born: November 24, 1944; Clay, West Virginia, U.S.
- Died: December 30, 2024 (aged 80)
- Political party: Democratic
- Spouse: Beverly Carper (m. 1969)
- Children: 4
- Parents: Kelles Nichols (father); Beulah Grose (mother)

Clinton Nolan Nichols (November 24, 1944 – December 30, 2024) was an American politician from the state of West Virginia. He served as a Democratic member of the West Virginia House of Delegates from 1993 to 1996. Born in Clay, West Virginia, he was the son of Kelles and Beulah (née Grose) Nichols. He married Beverly Carper in 1969, and they would have four children. A farmer and printer, he owned the Elk Printing Company and the Clay County Free Press for nearly 40 years. When Governor Gaston Caperton elevated 33rd district delegate Randy Schoonover to the state senate, he appointed Nichols to fill his seat, effective October 14, 1993. The following year, he narrowly won the Democratic primary for re-election, and won the general election unopposed. He then narrowly lost the 1996 primary to Bill Stemple. Nichols died on December 30, 2024, at the age of 80.

== Electoral history ==
=== 1994 ===
==== Primary ====
West Virginia House of Delegates, District 33, 1994 primary election Source:
Party	Candidate	Votes	%
Democratic	Clint Nichols	1,176	40.5
Democratic	C. W. "Charlie" Haverty	1,155	39.7
Democratic	Donny Wehrle	575	19.8
Total votes		2,906	100

==== General election ====
West Virginia House of Delegates, District 33, 1994 general election Source:
Party	Candidate	Votes	%
Democratic	Clint Nichols	2,479	100
Total votes		2,479	100

=== 1996 ===
==== Primary ====
West Virginia House of Delegates, District 33, 1996 primary election * denotes incumbent Source:
Party	Candidate	Votes	%
Democratic	Bill Stemple	1,201	25.1
Democratic	Clint Nichols *	1,141	23.9
Democratic	David A. Walker	952	19.9
Democratic	Marjorie Dale Mullins	780	16.3
Democratic	C. W. "Charlie" Haverty	703	14.7
Total votes		4,777	100
