= Minny Luimstra-Albeda =

Dutch politician (1935–2024)

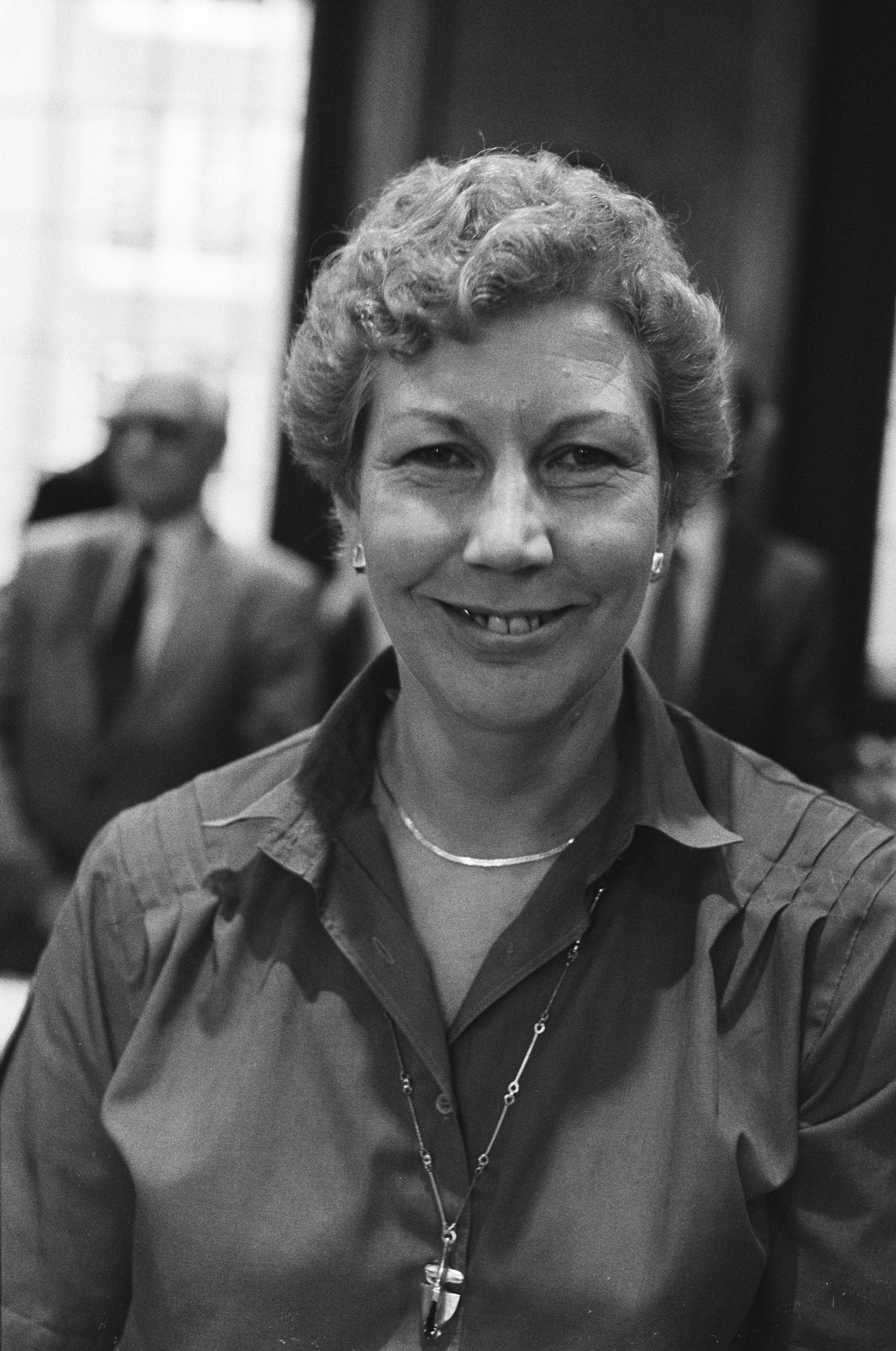
- Luimstra-Albeda in 1982

Member of the Senate of the Netherlands
- In office 17 November 1992 – 8 June 1999

Personal details
- Born: Mintje Albeda; 8 April 1935; Rotterdam, Netherlands
- Died: 3 December 2024 (aged 89)
- Political party: CDA
- Relatives: Wil Albeda (brother)
- Occupation: Businesswoman

Mintje "Minny" Luimstra-Albeda (8 April 1935 – 3 December 2024) was a Dutch businesswoman and politician. A member of the Christian Democratic Appeal, she served in the Senate from 1992 to 1999. She was the sister of politician Wil Albeda.

Luimstra-Albeda died on 3 December 2024, at the age of 89.
