= Cloyd Robinson =

American politician (1938–2024)

Member of the Iowa Senate
- In office 1971–1981

Personal details
- Born: April 25, 1938 Norway, Iowa, U.S.
- Died: December 30, 2024 (aged 86) Hiawatha, Iowa, U.S.
- Party: Democratic
- Spouse: Shirlene Rimrodt (m. 1956)
- Children: 4
- Parent(s): Earl and Florence Robinson

Cloyd E. "Robby" Robinson (April 25, 1938 – December 30, 2024) was an American politician from the state of Iowa. He was born in Norway, Iowa, the son of Earl and Florence Robinson. He married Shirlene Rimrodt in 1956, and they would have four children. He served as a Democratic member of the Iowa Senate from 1971 to 1981. In 1974, he was the Democratic nominee for Secretary of State of Iowa, and he lost the general election to longtime incumbent Republican Melvin D. Synhorst by a margin of 55%–44%. Robinson died in Hiawatha, Iowa on December 30, 2024, at the age of 86.

== Electoral history ==
=== 1970 ===
==== Special election ====
Iowa Senate, District 22, 1970 special election * denotes incumbent Source:
Party	Candidate	Votes	%
Democratic	Cloyd Robinson	2,782	55.8
Republican	Jesse G. Hunter	2,201	44.2
Total votes		4,983	100

=== 1972 ===
==== General election ====
Iowa Senate, District 14, 1972 general election * denotes incumbent Source:
Party	Candidate	Votes	%
Democratic	Cloyd Robinson *	11,827	54.3
Republican	Gay Dahn	9,939	45.7
Write-in		1	0.0
Total votes		21,767	100

=== 1974 ===
==== General election ====
Iowa Secretary of State, 1974 general election * denotes incumbent Source:
Party	Candidate	Votes	%
Republican	Melvin D. Synhorst *	473,329	54.9
Democratic	Cloyd Robinson	388,200	45.1
Write-in		31	0.0
Total votes		861,560	100

=== 1976 ===
==== General election ====
Iowa Senate, District 14, 1976 general election * denotes incumbent Source:
Party	Candidate	Votes	%
Democratic	Cloyd Robinson *	14,575	65.4
Republican	Sandra L. Pink	7,366	33.0
Independent	Gary W. McCune	350	1.6
Write-in		2	0.0
Total votes		22,293	100
