= William J. Hennessy Jr. =

American court sketch artist (1957–2024)

William J. Hennessy Jr. (December 9, 1957 – December 9, 2024) was an American court sketch artist. He died on December 9, 2024, his 67th birthday.
