= Júlio Costamilan =

Brazilian politician (1934–2024)

Member of the Brazilian Constituent Assembly
- In office 1 February 1987 – 22 July 1988

Member of the Chamber of Deputies of Brazil
- In office 1 February 1979 – 31 January 1991

Personal details
- Born: 1 July 1934 Caxias do Sul, Rio Grande do Sul, Brazil
- Died: 9 December 2024 (aged 90) Caxias do Sul, Rio Grande do Sul, Brazil
- Party: MDB
- Education: Pontifical Catholic University of Rio Grande do Sul
- Occupation: Lawyer

Júlio Costamilan (1 July 1934 – 9 December 2024) was a Brazilian lawyer and politician. A member of the Brazilian Democratic Movement, he served in the Chamber of Deputies from 1979 to 1991 and served on the Brazilian Constituent Assembly from 1987 to 1988.

Costamilan died in Caxias do Sul on 9 December 2024, at the age of 90.
