= Toshifumi Nakamura =

Japanese politician (1939–2024)

- 中村寿文

Member of the Aomori Prefectural Assembly
- In office April 2007 – April 2015
- Constituency: Hachinohe City
- In office 1983–2001
- Constituency: Hachinohe City

Mayor of Hachinohe
- In office 17 November 2001 – 16 November 2005
- Preceded by: Nobuo Nakasato
- Succeeded by: Makoto Kobayashi

Personal details
- Born: 4 August 1939 Hachinohe, Aomori, Japan
- Died: 1 December 2024 (aged 85) Hachinohe, Aomori, Japan
- Party: Democratic
- Other political affiliations: LDP
- Parent: Takudō Nakamura (father)
- Education: Keio University

Toshifumi Nakamura (Japanese: 中村寿文 Nakamura Toshifumi; 4 August 1939 – 1 December 2024) was a Japanese politician. A member of the Liberal Democratic Party and later the Democratic Party, he served as mayor of Hachinohe from 2001 to 2005. He was a member of the Aomori Prefectural Assembly from 1983 to 2001 and again from 2007 to 2015.

Nakamura died on 1 December 2024, at the age of 85.
