= Michael Gill (cricketer) =

New Zealand cricketer (1957–2024)

Mike Gill
Personal information
- Full name: Michael Fredrick Gill
- Born: 19 March 1957; Whanganui, New Zealand
- Died: 8 December 2024 (aged 67); Whanganui, New Zealand
- Batting: Right-handed
- Bowling: Right-arm fast
- Role: Bowler

Domestic team information
- Years: Team
- 1974/75–1981/82: Central Districts

Career statistics
Competition	First-class	List A
Matches	19	8
Runs scored	71	6
Batting average	5.91	6.00
100s/50s	0/0	0/0
Top score	16	2*
Balls bowled	2,778	426
Wickets	44	11
Bowling average	31.75	28.54
5 wickets in innings	2	0
10 wickets in match	0	–
Best bowling	6/53	4/27
Catches/stumpings	4/–	1/–
- Source: Cricinfo, 29 October 2020

Michael Fredrick Gill (19 March 1957 – 8 December 2024) was a New Zealand cricketer. He played in 19 first-class and eight List A matches for Central Districts from 1974 to 1982.

Gill was a right-arm opening bowler. His best first-class figures were 6 for 53 in Central Districts' victory over Canterbury in the 1980–81 Shell Trophy. He had taken his best one-day figures a few weeks earlier, 4 for 27 in Central Districts' victory over Otago. He also played Hawke Cup cricket for Wanganui and Hutt Valley between 1974 and 1986.

Gill died in Whanganui on 8 December 2024, at the age of 67. He had three sons and a stepdaughter. His wife Angela predeceased him.
