= The Stanford Prison Experiment (film) =

2015 American film

- Theatrical release poster
- Directed by: Kyle Patrick Alvarez
- Written by: Tim Talbott
- Based on: The Lucifer Effect by Philip Zimbardo
- Produced by: Lauren Bratman; Brent Emery; Lizzie Friedman; Karen Lauder; Greg Little
- Starring: Billy Crudup; Michael Angarano; Ezra Miller; Tye Sheridan; Olivia Thirlby; Nelsan Ellis
- Cinematography: Jas Shelton
- Edited by: Fernando Collins
- Music by: Andrew Hewitt
- Production companies: Abandon Pictures; Coup d'Etat Films; Sandbar Pictures
- Distributed by: IFC Films
- Release dates: January 26, 2015 (Sundance); July 17, 2015 (United States)
- Running time: 122 minutes
- Country: United States
- Language: English
- Box office: $660,561 (U.S.); $18,860 (worldwide)

The Stanford Prison Experiment is a 2015 American docudrama psychological thriller film directed by Kyle Patrick Alvarez, written by Tim Talbott, and starring Billy Crudup, Michael Angarano, Ezra Miller, Tye Sheridan, Keir Gilchrist, Olivia Thirlby, and Nelsan Ellis. The plot concerns the 1971 Stanford prison experiment, conducted at Stanford University under the supervision of psychology professor Philip Zimbardo, in which students played the role of either a prisoner or correctional officer.

The project was announced in 2002 and remained in development for twelve years, with filming beginning on August 19, 2014, in Los Angeles. The film was financed and produced by Sandbar Pictures and Abandon Pictures, and premiered at the 2015 Sundance Film Festival on January 26, before beginning a limited theatrical release on July 17, 2015. The film received positive reviews from critics.

== Plot ==
Stanford University psychology professor Philip Zimbardo conducts a psychological experiment to investigate the hypothesis that roles in social situations, rather than individual personality traits, cause participants' behavior. In the experiment, Zimbardo selects eighteen male students to participate in a 14-day prison simulation to take roles as prisoners or guards. They receive $15 per day. The experiment is conducted in a mock prison located in the basement of Jordan Hall, the university's psychology department building. The students who are guards become abusive, as does Zimbardo himself, as they immerse themselves in their assigned roles. Two students who play the role of prisoners quit the experiment early due to psychological meltdowns. After being chastised and roughly brought back to reality by his girlfriend Christina Maslach, Zimbardo abruptly stops the entire experiment after only six days.

== Cast ==
- Billy Crudup as Dr. Philip Zimbardo, the lead psychologist of the experiment and plays the role of the prison superintendent
- Michael Angarano as Christopher Archer / "John Wayne" Guard, a guard in the experiment who becomes the most abusive
- Ezra Miller as Daniel Culp / Prisoner 8612, a prisoner in the experiment who eventually quits after a mental breakdown
- Tye Sheridan as Peter Mitchell / Prisoner 819, a prisoner in the experiment. He is the second prisoner to quit after breaking down.
- Keir Gilchrist as John Lovett, a guard in the experiment
- Olivia Thirlby as Dr. Christina Maslach, Dr. Zimbardo's girlfriend who persuades him to see the error of his ways
- Nelsan Ellis as Jesse Fletcher, a man recruited to the experiment by Zimbardo for his "experience", having served 17 years in a real prison.
- Moisés Arias as Anthony Carroll, a guard in the experiment
- Nicholas Braun as Karl Vandy, a guard in the experiment who is one of the most abusive
- Gaius Charles as Paul Vogel, one of Zimbardo's associates
- Ki Hong Lee as Gavin Lee / Prisoner 3401, a prisoner in the experiment who takes vitamins
- Thomas Mann as Prisoner 416, a prisoner in the experiment brought in as a replacement
- Logan Miller as Jerry Sherman / Prisoner 5486, a prisoner in the experiment. He is bespectacled and gets headaches when not wearing his glasses.
- Johnny Simmons as Jeff Jansen / Prisoner 1037, a prisoner in the experiment who had originally advised to do what they were told
- James Wolk as Mike Penny, one of Zimbardo's associates who also plays the prison warden in the experiment
- Matt Bennett as Kyle Parker, one of Zimbardo's associates
- Jesse Carere as Paul Beattie / Prisoner 5704, a prisoner in the experiment and a smoker
- Brett Davern as Hubbie Whitlow / Prisoner 7258, a prisoner in the experiment who does not take it seriously at first, then realizes the severity of their situation
- James Frecheville as Matthew Townshend, a guard in the experiment
- Miles Heizer as Marshall Lovett, a guard in the experiment. He does not appear to be as abusive as his colleagues.
- Jack Kilmer as Jim Randall / Prisoner 4325, a prisoner in the experiment
- Callan McAuliffe as Hen, a guard in the experiment
- Benedict Samuel as Jacob Harding, a guard in the experiment
- Chris Sheffield as Tom Thompson / Prisoner 2093, a prisoner in the experiment who attempts to be obedient
- Harrison Thomas as Andrew Ceros, a guard in the experiment

== Production ==
A film about the Stanford prison experiment was first announced in 2002 when producer Brent Emery signed Tim Talbott to write the script for the film. Problems beset and delayed the project for twelve years, including financing and the 2007 writers' strike. In 2006, two competing films about the experiment were in development, one at Maverick Films and the other Inferno's The Experiment, which was a remake of the German film Das Experiment from 2001. Maverick Films, having an ownership break up in August 2008, continued on as Imprint Entertainment Imprint was expected to start filming in January 2009 under producer Christopher McQuarrie.

On August 19, 2014, Sandbar Pictures and Abandon Pictures came on board to finance the film. Kyle Patrick Alvarez was set to direct, and producers were Brent Emery, Lizzie Friedman, Greg Little, Lauren Bratman and Brian Geraghty.

=== Casting ===
On August 19, 2014, it was announced that Billy Crudup, Ezra Miller and Michael Angarano would play lead roles. On August 26, Jack Kilmer joined the cast to play Jim Randall, one of the student prisoners whose personality makes him a perfect subject to comply. On August 28, Nicholas Braun joined the film to play Karl Vandy, an abusive and sadistic guard. On September 4, Brett Davern was added to the cast, playing Hubbie Whitlow, an affable young participant whose failed escape attempt leads to grueling humiliation at the hands of sadistic guards. On September 9, Jesse Carere joined the cast to play Paul Beattie, Prisoner 5704, a gangly man who counts smoking as his only vice. On October 10, more of the ensemble cast was announced, including Olivia Thirlby as Dr. Christina Maslach, professor Zimbardo's future wife and fellow academic, Nelsan Ellis as Jesse Fletcher, Tye Sheridan as prisoner Peter Mitchell, James Frecheville as guard Matthew Townshend, Johnny Simmons as prisoner Jeff Jansen, and Ki Hong Lee as prisoner Gavin Lee.

=== Filming ===
Principal photography began on August 19, 2014, in Los Angeles, and lasted 21 days.

== Release ==
The film premiered at the Sundance Film Festival on January 26, 2015. By coincidence, Experimenter, a film about another notorious psychological experiment, the Milgram experiment, had premiered at Sundance the day before.

IFC Films acquired the US rights to the film on March 5, 2015. The film was theatrically released on July 17, 2015, by IFC Films, and on Blu-Ray and iTunes on November 17, 2015.

== Reception ==
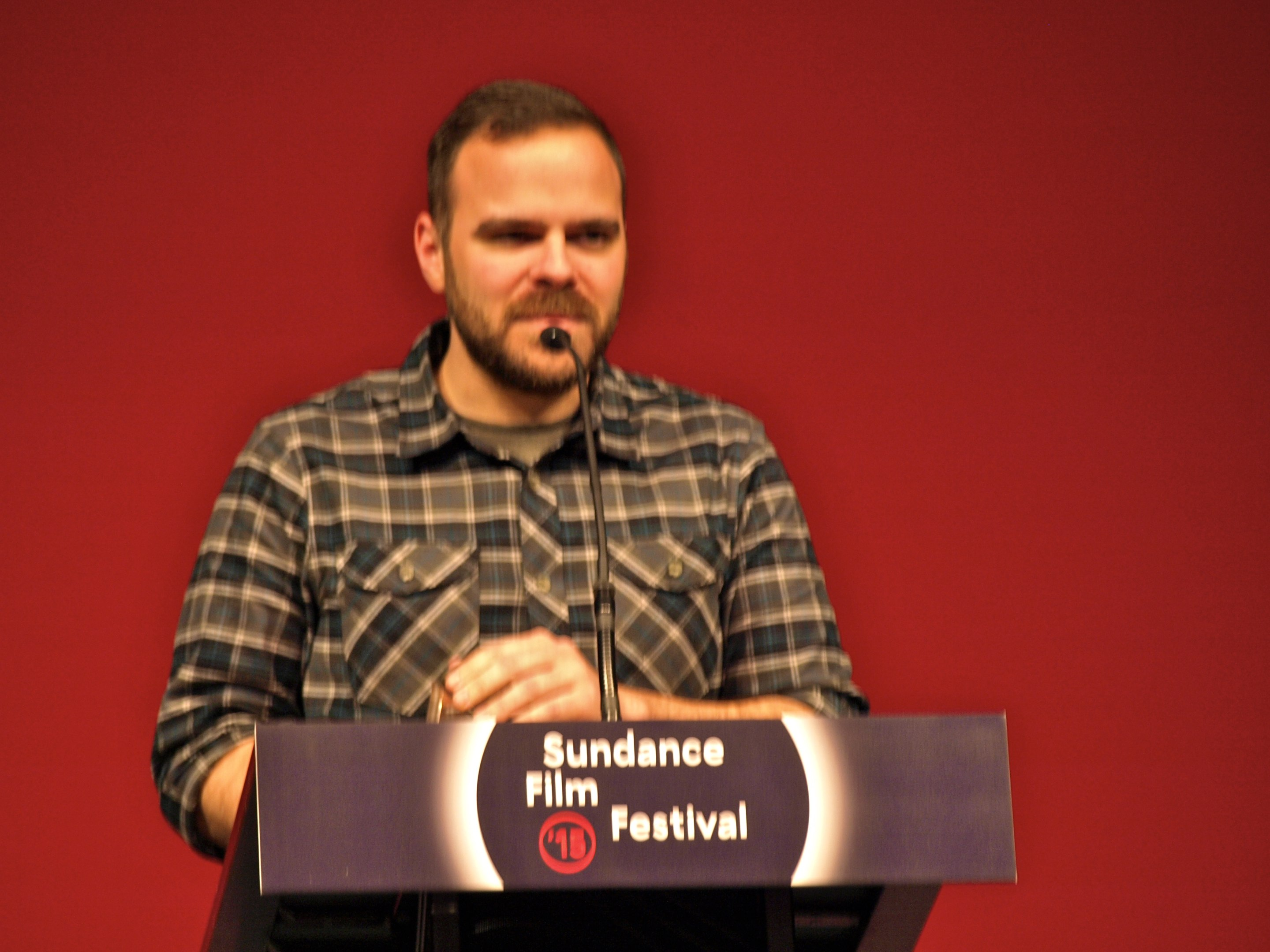
Director Kyle Patrick Alvarez at the 2015 Sundance Film Festival

Upon its premiere at the 2015 Sundance Film Festival, The Stanford Prison Experiment received a positive response from critics. Review aggregator Rotten Tomatoes indicates an 84% approval rating, based on reviews from 103 critics, with an average score of 7/10. The site's consensus states: "As chillingly thought-provoking as it is absorbing and well-acted, The Stanford Prison Experiment offers historical drama that packs a timelessly relevant punch." On the review site Metacritic, the film has a score of 67 out of 100, based on 26 critics, indicating "generally favorable reviews".

Leslie Felperin of The Hollywood Reporter gave the film a positive review, writing: "For all its flaws it's a rich, thought-provoking film which, while challenging, is not without humor and visual pleasures." Jordan Hoffman of The Guardian gave the film four out of five stars and judged that "Director Kyle Patrick Alvarez deserves all the praise in the world for the way he cranks up this pressure cooker script." Edward Douglas in his review for ComingSoon praised the film, remarking: "While this is going to be a polarizing and divisive film, it's one that people will talk about after seeing it, almost as if it was made as an experiment itself."

However, Justin Chang of Variety criticized the film, saying "The combination of relentless forward drive and gruesomely fastidious detail, while audacious and admirable in theory, begins to pay dwindling returns in a picture that feels rather longer than its 122-minute running time."

== Accolades ==
List of accolades
| Award / Film festival | Category | Recipient(s) | Result |
|---|---|---|---|
| 31st Sundance Film Festival | Grand Jury Prize (U.S. Dramatic) | Kyle Patrick Alvarez and Tim Talbott | Nominated |
| 31st Sundance Film Festival | Alfred P. Sloan Feature Film Prize | Kyle Patrick Alvarez and Tim Talbott | Won |
| 31st Sundance Film Festival | Waldo Salt Screenwriting Award (U.S. Dramatic) | Tim Talbott | Won |

Awards
| Preceded by I Origins | Alfred P. Sloan Prize Winner; 2015 | Succeeded by Embrace of the Serpent |
