= Electoral history of Gordon Brown =

List of elections featuring Gordon Brown as a candidate

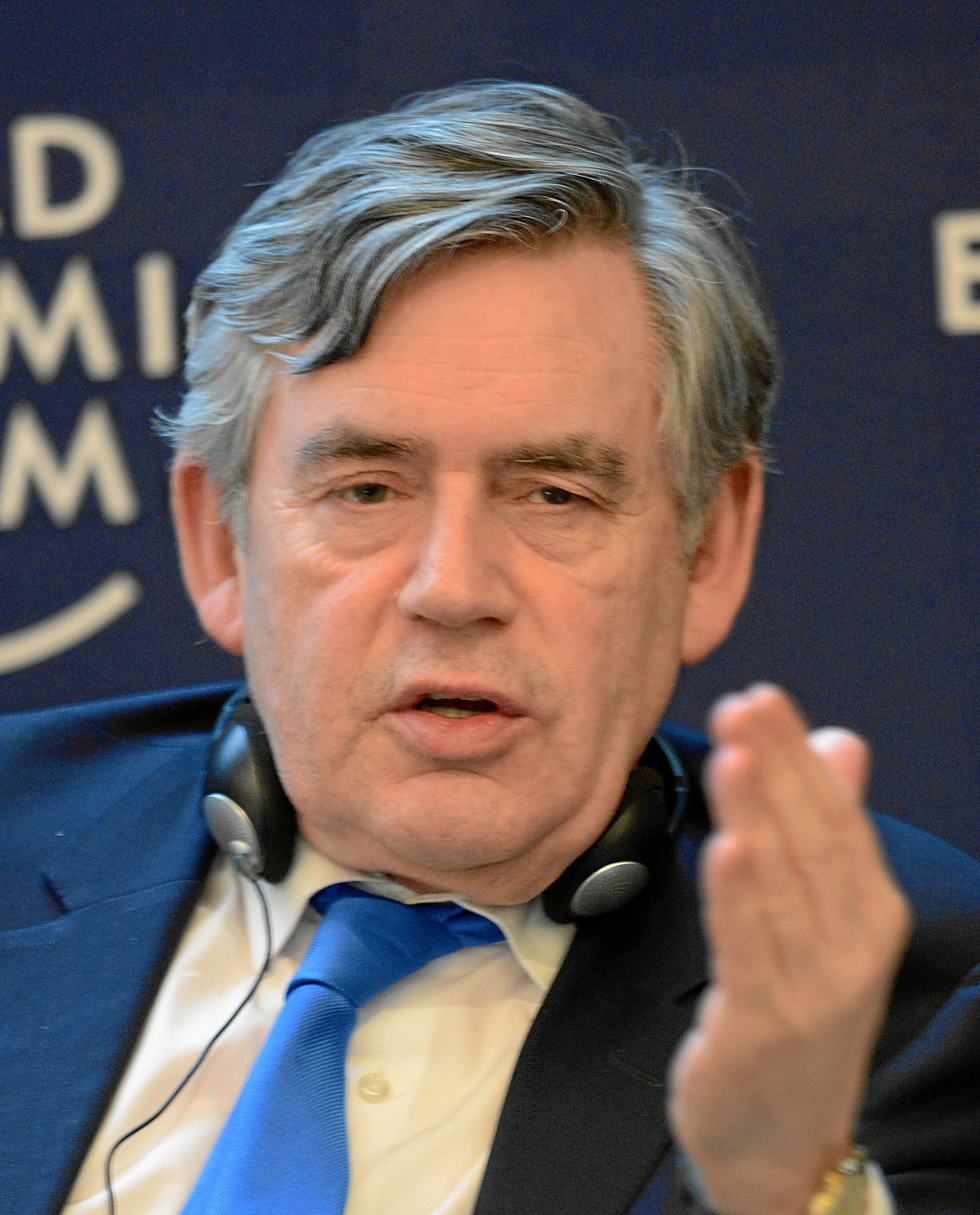

This is a summary of the electoral history of Gordon Brown, who served as Prime Minister of the United Kingdom and Leader of the Labour Party from 2007 to 2010. He was the member of parliament (MP) for Dunfermline East from 1983 to 2005 and Kirkcaldy and Cowdenbeath from 2005 to 2015.

== Parliamentary elections ==
=== 1979 general election, Edinburgh South ===
General election 1979: Edinburgh South
Party	Candidate	Votes	%	±%
Conservative	Michael Ancram	17,986	39.74	+3.82
Labour	Gordon Brown	15,526	34.30	+6.12
Liberal	J.P. Bryan Lovell	7,400	16.35	+2.13
SNP	Robert Shirley	3,800	8.40	−13.29
Ecology	Stewart M. Biggar	552	1.22	New
Majority		2,460	5.43	−2.29
Turnout		45,264	77.30	+3.12
Conservative hold		Swing		

=== 1983 general election, Dunfermline East ===
General election 1983: Dunfermline East
Party	Candidate	Votes	%	±%
Labour	Gordon Brown	18,515	51.5	−10.5
Liberal	David Harcus	7,214	20.1	
Conservative	Clive Shenton	6,764	18.8	−2.8
SNP	George Hunter	2,573	7.2	−6.8
Communist	Alex Maxwell	864	2.4	
Majority		11,301	31.4	
Turnout		35,930	72.0	
Labour win (new seat)				

=== 1987 general election, Dunfermline East ===
General election 1987: Dunfermline East
Party	Candidate	Votes	%	±%
Labour	Gordon Brown	25,381	64.5	+13.0
Conservative	Clive Shenton	5,792	14.8	−4.0
Liberal	Elizabeth Harris	4,122	10.5	−9.6
SNP	Alice McGarry	3,901	10.0	+2.8
Majority		19,589	49.7	+18.3
Turnout		39,196	76.6	+4.6
Labour hold		Swing	+8.5	

=== 1992 general election, Dunfermline East ===
General election 1992: Dunfermline East
Party	Candidate	Votes	%	±%
Labour	Gordon Brown	23,692	62.4	−2.1
Conservative	Mark E. Tennant	6,248	16.5	+1.7
SNP	John V. Lloyd	5,746	15.1	+5.1
Liberal Democrats	Teresa Martin Little	2,262	6.0	−4.5
Majority		17,444	45.9	−3.8
Turnout		37,948	75.6	−1.0
Labour hold		Swing	−2.4	

=== 1997 general election, Dunfermline East ===
General election 1997: Dunfermline East
Party	Candidate	Votes	%	±%
Labour	Gordon Brown	24,441	66.8	+4.4
SNP	John Ramage	5,690	15.6	+0.5
Conservative	Iain Mitchell	3,656	10.0	−6.5
Liberal Democrats	Jim Tolson	2,164	5.9	−0.1
Referendum	Thomas Dunsmore	632	1.7	New
Majority		18,751	51.2	+6.3
Turnout		36,583	69.6	−7.0
Labour hold		Swing	+2.5	

=== 2001 general election, Dunfermline East ===
General election 2001: Dunfermline East
Party	Candidate	Votes	%	±%
Labour	Gordon Brown	19,487	64.8	−2.0
SNP	Johnny Mellon	4,424	14.7	−0.9
Conservative	Stuart Randall	2,838	9.4	−0.6
Liberal Democrats	John Mainland	2,281	7.6	+1.7
Scottish Socialist	Andrew Jackson	770	2.6	New
UKIP	Thomas Dunsmore	286	1.0	New
Majority		15,063	50.1	−1.1
Turnout		30,086	57.0	−12.6
Labour hold		Swing	-1.4	

=== 2005 general election, Kirkcaldy and Cowdenbeath ===
General election 2005: Kirkcaldy and Cowdenbeath
Party	Candidate	Votes	%	±%
Labour	Gordon Brown	24,278	58.1	−0.4
SNP	Alan Bath	6,062	14.5	−4.1
Liberal Democrats	Alex Cole-Hamilton	5,450	13.0	+3.8
Conservative	Stuart Randall	4,308	10.3	−0.3
Scottish Socialist	Steve West	666	1.6	−1.1
UKIP	Peter Adams	516	1.2	+0.8
Scottish Senior Citizens	James Parker	425	1.0	
Independent	Elizabeth Kwantes	47	0.1	
Independent	Pat Sargent	44	0.1	
Majority		18,216	43.6	+3.7
Turnout		41,796	58.4	
Labour win (new seat)				

=== 2010 general election, Kirkcaldy and Cowdenbeath ===
General election 2010: Kirkcaldy and Cowdenbeath
Party	Candidate	Votes	%	±%
Labour	Gordon Brown	29,559	64.5	+6.4
SNP	Douglas Chapman	6,550	14.3	−0.2
Liberal Democrats	John Mainland	4,269	9.3	−3.7
Conservative	Lindsay Paterson	4,258	9.3	−1.0
UKIP	Peter Adams	760	1.7	+0.5
Independent	Susan Archibald	184	0.4	New
Independent	Donald MacLaren	165	0.4	New
Land Party	Derek Jackson	57	0.1	New
Majority		23,009	50.2	+6.6
Turnout		45,802	62.2	+3.8
Labour hold		Swing	+3.3	

== 2010 United Kingdom general election ==
Summary of the May 2010 House of Commons of the United Kingdom election results
Political party	Leader	Candidates						Votes		
Political party	Leader	Nominated	Elected	Of total (%)	Gained	Lost	Net	Count	Proportion of total (%)	Change in proportion (%)
Conservative (Note: This figure excludes John Bercow (Buckingham))	David Cameron	631	306	47.1	100	3	+97	10,703,754	36.1	+3.7
Labour	Gordon Brown	631	258	39.7	3	94	−91	8,609,527	29.0	−6.2
Liberal Democrats	Nick Clegg	631	57	8.8	8	13	−5	6,836,824	23.0	+1.0
UKIP	Lord Pearson	558	0	0	0	0	0	919,546	3.1	+0.9
BNP	Nick Griffin	338	0	0	0	0	0	564,331	1.9	+1.2
SNP	Alex Salmond	59	6	0.9	0	0	0	491,386	1.7	+0.1
Green	Caroline Lucas	310	1	0.2	1	0	+1	265,247	0.9	−0.2
Sinn Féin	Gerry Adams	17	5	0.8	0	0	0	171,942	0.6	−0.1
DUP	Peter Robinson	16	8	1.2	0	1	−1	168,216	0.6	−0.3
Plaid Cymru	Ieuan Wyn Jones	40	3	0.5	1	0	+1	165,394	0.6	−0.1
SDLP	Margaret Ritchie	18	3	0.5	0	0	0	110,970	0.4	−0.1
UCU-NF	Reg Empey	17	0	0	0	1	−1	102,361	0.3	−0.1
English Democrat	Robin Tilbrook	107	0	0	0	0	0	64,826	0.2	0.2
Alliance	David Ford	18	1	0.2	1	0	+1	42,762	0.1	0.0
Respect	Salma Yaqoob	11	0	0	0	1	−1	33,251	0.1	−0.1
TUV	Jim Allister	10	0	0	0	0	0	26,300	0.1	—
Speaker	—	1	1	0.2	0	0	0	22,860	0.1	0.0
Independent – Rodney Connor	—	1	0	0	0	0	0	21,300	0.1	—
Independent – Sylvia Hermon	—	1	1	0.2	1	0	+1	21,181	0.1	—
Christian	George Hargreaves	71	0	0	0	0	0	18,623	0.1	+0.1
Scottish Green	Eleanor Scott and Patrick Harvie	20	0	0	0	0	0	16,827	0.1	0.0
Health Concern	Richard Taylor	1	0	0	0	1	−1	16,150	0.1	0.0
Independent – Bob Spink	—	1	0	0	0	0	0	12,174	0.0	—
TUSC	Dave Nellist	37	0	0	0	0	0	12,275	0.0	—
National Front	Ian Edward	17	0	0	0	0	0	10,784	0.0	0.0
Buckinghamshire Campaign for Democracy	John Stevens	1	0	0	0	0	0	10,331	0.0	—
Monster Raving Loony	Howling Laud Hope	27	0	0	0	0	0	7,510	0.0	0.0
Socialist Labour	Arthur Scargill	23	0	0	0	0	0	7,196	0.0	−0.1
Liberal	Rob Wheway	5	0	0	0	0	0	6,781	0.0	−0.1
Blaenau Gwent PV	Dai Davies	1	0	0	0	1	−1	6,458	0.0	−0.1
CPA	Alan Craig	17	0	0	0	0	0	6,276	0.0	0.0
Mebyon Kernow	Dick Cole	6	0	0	0	0	0	5,379	0.0	0.0
Lincolnshire Independent	Marianne Overton	3	0	0	0	0	0	5,311	0.0	—
Mansfield Independent Forum		1	0	0	0	0	0	4,339	0.0	—
Green (NI)	Mark Bailey and Karly Greene	4	0	0	0	0	0	3,542	0.0	0.0
Socialist Alternative	Peter Taaffe	4	0	0	0	0	0	3,298	0.0	0.0
Trust	Stuart Wheeler	2	0	0	0	0	0	3,233	0.0	—
Scottish Socialist	Colin Fox and Frances Curran	10	0	0	0	0	0	3,157	0.0	−0.1
People Before Profit	—	1	0	0	0	0	0	2,936	0.0	—
Local Liberals People Before Politics		1	0	0	0	0	0	1,964	0.0	—
Independent – Esther Rantzen	—	1	0	0	0	0	0	1,872	0.0	—
Alliance for Green Socialism	Mike Davies	6	0	0	0	0	0	1,581	0.0	0.0
SDP	Peter Johnson	2	0	0	0	0	0	1,551	0.0	—
Pirate	Andrew Robinson	9	0	0	0	0	0	1,348	0.0	—
Common Sense Party	Howard Thomas	2	0	0	0	0	0	1,173	0.0	0.0
Staffordshire Independent Group		1	0	0	0	0	0	1,208	0.0	0.0
Tendring First		1	0	0	0	0	0	1,078	0.0	0.0
Solihull and Meriden Residents Association		2	0	0	0	0	0	977	0.0	0.0
Communist	Robert Griffiths	6	0	0	0	0	0	947	0.0	0.0
Democratic Labour	Brian Powell	1	0	0	0	0	0	842	0.0	0.0
English Independence Party		1	0	0	0	0	0	803	0.0	0.0
Democratic Nationalist Party		2	0	0	0	0	0	753	0.0	—
Save King George Hospital		1	0	0	0	0	0	746	0.0	0.0
Workers Revolutionary	Sheila Torrance	7	0	0	0	0	0	738	0.0	0.0
Peace	John Morris	3	0	0	0	0	0	737	0.0	0.0
Animal Protection	—	4	0	0	0	0	0	675	0.0	0.0
Christian Movement for Great Britain		2	0	0	0	0	0	598	0.0	0.0
New Millennium Bean Party	Captain Beany	1	0	0	0	0	0	558	0.0	0.0
Total		3,720	650	100	115	115	0	29,687,604	Turnout: 65.1	
