= The Lucifer Effect =

2007 book by Philip Zimbardo

The Lucifer Effect: Understanding How Good People Turn Evil
- Cover art of the 1st edition
- Author: Philip Zimbardo
- Audio read by: Kevin Foley (Tantor Media)
- Cover artist: Mercedes Everett
- Language: English
- Subject: Psychology of good and evil
- Publisher: Random House, Rider
- Publication date: March 27, 2007
- Publication place: United States
- Media type: Print, Digital, Audio
- Pages: 551
- Awards: William James Book Award, 2008
- ISBN: 978-1-4000-6411-3 (hardcover, 1st ed.)
- OCLC: 904142786
- Dewey Decimal: 155.9'62–dc22
- LC Class: BF789.E94Z56 2007
- Website: lucifereffect.com

The Lucifer Effect: Understanding How Good People Turn Evil is a 2007 book which includes professor Philip Zimbardo's first detailed, written account of the events surrounding the 1971 Stanford prison experiment (SPE) — a prison simulation study which had to be discontinued after only six days due to several distressing outcomes and mental breaks of the participants. The book includes over 30 years of subsequent research into the psychological and social factors which result in immoral acts being committed by otherwise moral people. It also examines the prisoner abuse at Abu Ghraib in 2003, which has similarities to the Stanford experiment. The title takes its name from the biblical story of the favored angel of God, Lucifer, his fall from grace, and his assumption of the role of Satan, the embodiment of evil. The book was briefly on The New York Times Non-Fiction Best Seller and won the American Psychological Association's 2008 William James Book Award.

== Overview ==
The first chapter is on the book's title theme of Lucifer and on the nature of moral transformation as an outcome of the interplay between individual disposition, situation, and systems of power. The largest portion of the book, Chapters 2 through 9, is primarily a day-by-day account of the events which transpired during the Stanford experiment, largely written in literary present tense with dialogue taken from original experiment transcripts, and includes several photographs taken at the time. Chapter 10 presents the data gathered in the SPE, and Chapter 11 is an examination of the ethical questions raised about the experiment. The remainder of the book covers a number of topics within the field of social psychology, such as similar studies like the Asch conformity experiments, the Milgram experiment, Albert Bandura's research on moral disengagement, research on the bystander effect by John M. Darley and Bibb Latané, and Zimbardo's own later work on deindividuation. There is also an examination of the Stanford experiment's relevance to events such as the Attica Prison riot and the torture and abuse of prisoners in the Abu Ghraib prison in Iraq in 2003, with a special focus on the story of Sergeant Ivan Frederick. Zimbardo relates his experience as an expert witness for the defense at Frederick's military trial, and describes his view of what led to an "All-American poster soldier" becoming involved in the torture of prisoners. The final chapter describes the concept of heroism, the key roles of Joe Darby, the whistleblower of the Abu Ghraib events, and Christina Maslach, the graduate student who convinced Zimbardo to end the Stanford experiment early, and advice on how to resist negative situations.

== Reviews ==
Rose McDermott wrote that the book "deserves to be required reading for all those interested in the intersection of psychological processes and political reality" and suggests that several sections would make excellent assigned readings in psychology coursework, such the chapter on heroism and Chapter 12 "Investigating Social Dynamics" which she called "the single best, most insightful, and concise summary of the history of social psychology I have ever read". Robert V. Levine said that "[t]his important book should be required reading not only for social scientists, but also for politicians, decision makers, educators" and that the "[Abu Ghraib] section alone is worth the price of the book". Juan Manso-Pinto (University of Concepción, Chile) in a Spanish language review wrote that "The Lucifer Effect, more than a book, is a manual of social psychology about evil" and that though "written in English, its simple and colloquial language facilitates its reading". Stuart Wheeler recommended the book, calling it "very readable".

Ervin Staub describes it as "a highly personal book" and as one which "makes a valuable contribution", but about the Stanford Prison Experiment itself, calls it a case study rather than an experiment. Joachim I. Krueger (Brown University) wrote that the book is "magnificent and timely", but offers a critical examination of the Stanford Prison Experiment, saying that if "judged against conventional standards, the SPE does not qualify as an experiment" and, bringing the interpretation back to one of disposition, said "[s]ituations do not 'overpower' people but rather reveal latent possibilities".

Theologian Richard Holloway wrote that Zimbardo's day-by-day account of the experiment was "too bloated and detailed ... his 250-page diary unbalances the book" and that "the book is better when it tries to apply the lesson of the experiment to other contexts".

== Reception ==
The Lucifer Effect was 11th on The New York Times Non-Fiction Best Seller list for the week ending April 7, 2007.

== Adaptations ==
Philip Zimbardo presented his work in The Lucifer Effect at TED2008.

The 2015 film The Stanford Prison Experiment drew on the dialogue presented in The Lucifer Effect, which was based on transcripts from the original experiment.
