= Discovering Psychology =

- Genre: Documentary film
- Directed by: West Coast Production: Ann Strunk (director of print projects) and Kim Storey (project director). Updated edition: Christine Herbes-Sommers (project director)
- Presented by: Philip Zimbardo (series host)
- Theme music composer: Original program: Gene Mackles (open titles & theme music)
- Composers: Original program: Tom Phillips (program music). Updated edition: Tom Martin and Tom Phillips (program music).
- Country of origin: United States

Production
- Executive producer: Original series: William C. Brennan. Updated edition: Michele Korf.

Original release
- Release: 1990 – 2001

Discovering Psychology is a PBS documentary on psychology presented by Philip Zimbardo, for which he received the Carl Sagan Award for Public Understanding of Science. The series was released in 1990, with an updated edition comprising three additional episodes in 2001.

== Episodes ==
1. Sensation and Perception
2. Understanding Research
3. Remembering and Forgetting
4. Cognitive Processes
5. Judgment and Decision Making
6. Motivation and Emotion
7. The Mind Awake and Asleep
8. The Mind Hidden and Divided
9. The Self
10. Testing and Intelligence
11. Sex and Gender
12. Maturing and Aging
13. The Power of the Situation
14. Constructing Social Reality
15. Psychopathology
16. Psychotherapy
17. Health, Mind, and Behavior
18. Applying Psychology in Life
19. Cognitive Neuroscience
20. Cultural Psychology
