= Jacquetta Wheeler =

English model

- Born: Jacquetta Lydia Wheeler; 16 October 1981 (age 45); London, England
- Occupation: Model
- Spouse: Jamie Allsopp (m. 2012)
- Modelling information
- Height: 1.80 m (5 ft 11 in)
- Hair colour: Blonde
- Eye colour: Brown
- Agency: IMG Models (New York); d'management group (Milan); Viva Model Management (London); Uno Models (Barcelona); MIKAs (Stockholm)

Jacquetta Lydia Wheeler (born 16 October 1981) is an English model.

Wheeler is the second of three children. Her father, Stuart Wheeler, was an entrepreneur and political activist, and her mother Tessa (born Codrington) was a photographer. She has an older sister, Sarah, and a younger sister, Charlotte. Through her mother, she is the descendant of many royal and noble figures, including Henry VII. At the age of fifteen, she was discovered by French fashion designer Stephan Janson, who asked her to go to Milan and appear in his fashion show. Later that year, she was stopped in England on her way to a salon by noted fashion photographer Mario Testino.

By the age of 17, Wheeler was on the cover of French Vogue and part of a Gucci advertisement campaign. Although she continued to go to school at The King's School, Canterbury —in Luxmoore House— Wheeler would often take off days to shoot for fashion companies, such as Calvin Klein, Prada, and The Gap.

In 1999, The Face magazine declared her the 'Model of the Millennium'. Designers have continued to embrace her androgynous, waif look. In 2002, The Sunday Times named her one of Britain's highest paid models. Wheeler's list of clients ranges from Shiatzy Chen, Burberry to Versace.

She dated British photographer Alexi Lubomirski and ultimately married hedge-fund manager Jamie Allsopp in June 2012.
