= Charles Wardle =

British businessman and politician (born 1939)

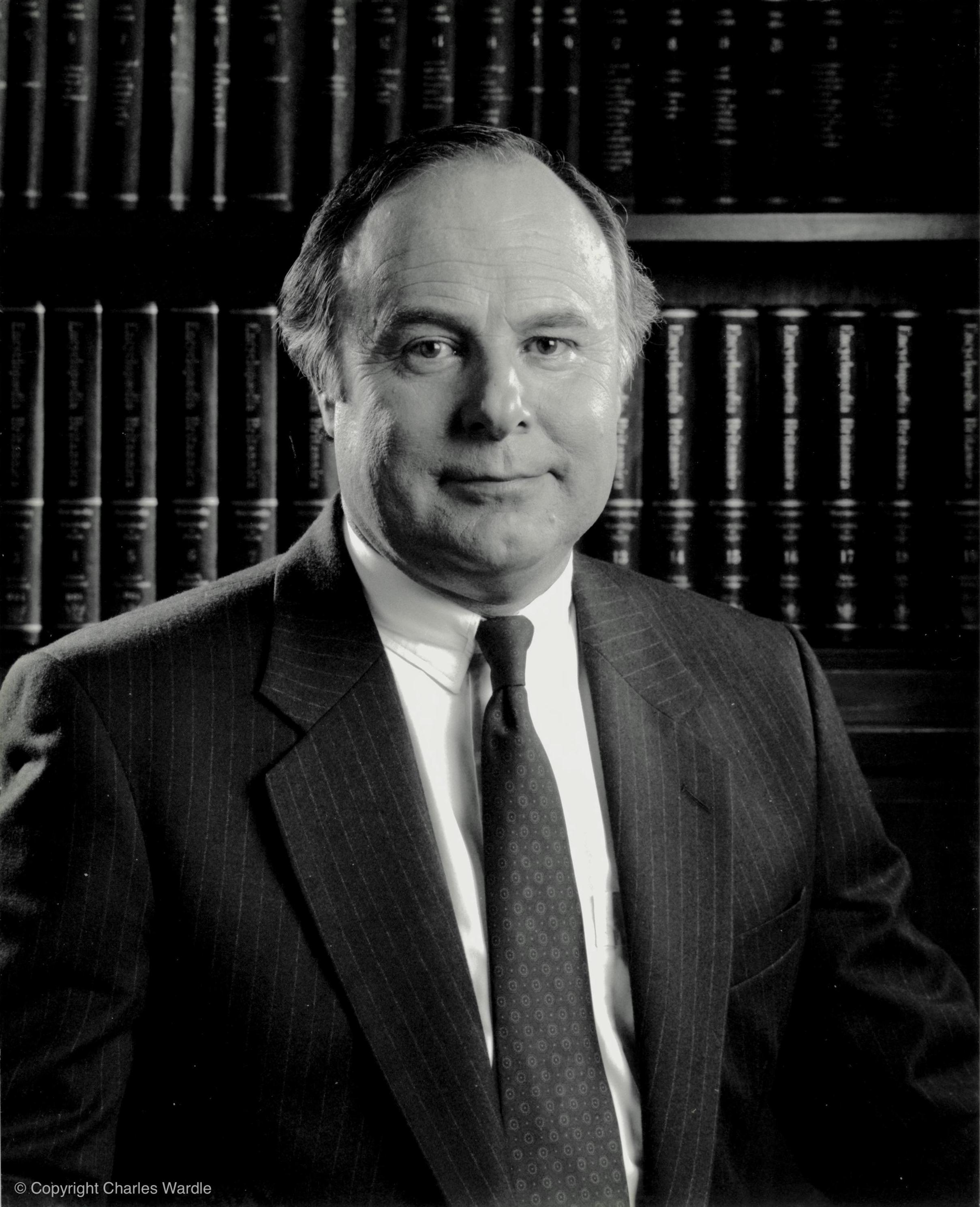

Member of Parliament for Bexhill and Battle
- In office 9 June 1983 – 14 May 2001
- Preceded by: Constituency established
- Succeeded by: Gregory Barker

Parliamentary Under-Secretary of State for Immigration and Nationality
- In office April 1992 – July 1994
- Prime Minister: John Major
- Preceded by: Peter Lloyd
- Succeeded by: Emily Blatch, Baroness Blatch

Parliamentary Under-Secretary of State for Industry
- In office July 1994 – February 1995
- Preceded by: Patrick McLoughlin

Personal details
- Born: 23 August 1939 (age 87) United Kingdom
- Other political affiliations: Conservative Party (until 2001)

Charles Frederick Wardle (born 23 August 1939) is a retired British businessman and politician who was the Conservative Member of Parliament for Bexhill and Battle from 1983 until 2001. In April 2001 for the last four weeks of his parliamentary career he sat without the Conservative whip because he and a group of his Conservative constituency workers would not endorse his successor, Greg Barker, until questions were answered about Barker's activities in Russia and about money he had obtained offshore. Later the Russian oligarch, whose company employed Barker, was sanctioned in the United States of America and in the United Kingdom.

== Early life and education ==
Charles Wardle is the son of Frederick Maclean Wardle, a civil engineer, and Constance (née Roach) the daughter of a Lincolnshire country parson. Raised in Tunbridge Wells he was educated at Tonbridge School from 1953 to 1958. Too young for National Service, he served for two years as an assistant district officer in Northern Rhodesia (now Zambia) and worked for six months in Jamaica before five years at university. At Lincoln College, Oxford, from 1961 to 1964, where he was president of the Junior Common Room and of the Fleming Society, he received an MA in Geography and at Harvard Business School, 1964-66 an MBA.

At Oxford he met Lesley Ann Wells who was reading Modern History at St Hugh's College and they married in August 1964 before going to America.

== Business career ==
Graduating from Harvard Business School, Wardle worked in New York, 1966–1969, as assistant to the president of American Express Company; in the City of London, 1969–1971, as a corporate finance executive at Morgan Grenfell and 1971–1974, as managing director of Robert Fraser & Partners; in the West Midlands, 1974–1983, as managing director and from 1977 executive chairman of Benjamin Priest Group plc. He was a member of the CBI National Council and of the Engineering Employers Federation from 1980 until his election to Parliament in 1983.

During his 18 years in Parliament Wardle's non-executive part-time business roles included consultancies with the accountants, KPMG, and UniChem plc and the chairmanship of the Ray Powell Group, a KPMG client.

=== Harrods ===
In April 2000, after he had said he would be leaving Parliament the following year, he joined the board of Harrods Ltd as a non-executive director with the prior consent of the leader of the Conservative Party. His constituency association wrote that his private business interests were entirely a matter for himself. Wardle's contract with Harrods was submitted to and approved by the Parliamentary Commissioner for Standards.

After leaving Parliament in 2001, Wardle's role at Harrods was upgraded to external affairs director in which capacity he met the prime minister of Thailand in Bangkok six times, the presidents of Pakistan and Chad and the King of Jordan. Having completed 21 months of his three-year contract at Harrods, however, Wardle identified an irregularity in the company's business in Thailand. He left the board with the balance of his three-year contract paid in full.

=== International negotiation ===
In 2003–2004 working under the aegis of the Foreign & Commonwealth Office Wardle negotiated for Lloyd's of London insurers the settlement with the state of Libya of outstanding Lockerbie claims brought by the hull insurers of Pan Am 103 and by Pan Am's trustee in bankruptcy; and in 2005–2006 he negotiated with the UN Compensation Commission in Geneva the payment to British insurers of claims arising from Iraq’s invasion of Kuwait. These international settlements brought into the UK more than $260 million that had been in dispute since the early 1990s.

== Political career ==
=== 1982–1987 ===
Wardle joined the Conservative Party’s approved candidates list in 1982. He applied for two seats, Stratford upon Avon and Solihull, reaching the final shortlist for both and was then selected for Bexhill and Battle, winning the seat in the 1983 general election.

In late 1983 he was appointed to the Trade and Industry Select Committee and in early 1984 he was made Parliamentary private secretary to Kenneth Clarke, Minister for Health and then to Norman Fowler, Secretary of State for Health and Social Services. Wardle campaigned with neighbouring MPs for local hospitals, by-passes and rail electrification; and campaigned unsuccessfully but with local acclaim to keep the Royal Greenwich Observatory at Herstmonceux.

=== 1987–1992 ===
Following the 1987 general election Wardle declined the invitation to continue as a Parliamentary private secretary; was appointed to the Treasury Select Committee; was made chairman of the Conservative Party’s One Nation Forum; and joined the executive committee of the European Atlantic Alliance. In 1991 he spoke for the Party in Hong Kong, Taiwan, New Zealand and California. Later that year he resumed as a Parliamentary private secretary, to Ian Lang, Secretary of State for Scotland.

=== 1992–1997 ===
Following the 1992 general election Wardle was appointed Parliamentary Under Secretary of State at the Home Office as Immigration Minister. He also had Commons responsibility for the Police and the Fire Service which were led by Lord Ferrers in the Lords. Wardle took the Asylum and Immigration Appeals Bill through its Commons stages; reviewed entry clearance procedures in Pakistan, India, Sri Lanka, Bangladesh and Hong Kong; and deputised for the Home Secretary at EU Councils of Interior and Justice Ministers in Copenhagen, Athens, Thessaloniki, Brussels and Luxembourg. He took a Police Bill through its standing committee stage; chaired the National Board for Crime Prevention; and chaired meetings of Fire Service chief officers and the Fire Brigades Union.

Moved to the Department of Trade and Industry in July 1994, Wardle led trade delegations to the United States, Canada, Japan, Taiwan, Hong Kong and Sweden. As an Energy Minister he participated in the 16th and 17th rounds of North Sea oil and gas licensing; addressed the World Energy Conference at Cartagena; and signed the Energy Charter Treaty in Lisbon. He was also the Government sponsor minister for Birmingham, Walsall and the Black Country. In 1995, after private correspondence and personal exchanges with Prime Minister John Major over fifteen months, Wardle resigned from the Government to speak independently on the need to preserve British border controls within the framework of the European Treaty. The Sunday Express, Daily Telegraph, Daily Mail, The Times, Sunday Times and Independent on Sunday all supported Wardle's reasons for his resignation. The issue Wardle raised, to keep in place British immigration controls on non-EU nationals coming to the UK from mainland Europe, was achieved by an opt-out for the UK in European Treaty law at the Amsterdam Intergovernmental Conference in 1997 by the new Labour Government who acknowledged Wardle's campaign.

Having left the Government, Wardle was an international observer for the 1996 Russian Presidential Election at Chita, Siberia, and joined a Conservative Central Office team of election advisers to the President of Moldova.

=== 1997–2001 ===
Following the 1997 general election, Wardle re-joined the Public Accounts Committee. With a member of the Defence Select Committee he attended a Moscow conference with senior Russian military personnel to discuss budgetary control of military field operations; he was part of a Parliamentary delegation to the US Senate, the IMF and the Federal Reserve; spoke for the Conservative Party in the Czech Republic; visited Taipei as a guest of the Taiwanese Government; was an Evelyn Wrench Fellowship speaker for the English Speaking Union in the US; and gave lectures to the Civil Service College.

In January 2000 Wardle was re-adopted unanimously by his constituency association for the next general election expected the following year. In April 2000, however, he informed his association executive that with great personal regret he and his wife had changed their minds about continuing for another Parliament because he needed to revert to his business career to make long-term financial provision after serious illness in their family.

In July 2000 the Bexhill and Battle constituency association interviewed for a new Parliamentary candidate for the next election, having asked Wardle to comment on their list of 186 applicants. Wardle wrote congratulating his successor, but in November 2000 a group of Wardle's senior local Conservative supporters voiced concern about the new candidate's recent employment in Moscow and the origins of money he had obtained offshore.

Without the Conservative whip at the close of his 18-year Parliamentary career for persisting with questions about Greg Barker’s Russian activities, after the dissolution of Parliament Wardle was approached by Nigel Farage with whom he had no previous contact whatsoever. He met Farage who decided at the last minute to stand in Bexhill and Battle. During Farage’s campaign Wardle told the local press: "I am a Conservative who has decided to lend my support to Farage at this election".

During the 2001–2005 Parliament Wardle was invited to discuss immigration controls with Tony Blair. He discussed technical issues of immigration control, notably the growing problem of illegal overstayers, with three of Blair's Home Secretaries. At the 2005 general election he attended a press conference to demolish an Opposition claim that more than 200 UK ports of entry would be occupied and monitored for immigration control.

Since he left Parliament in 2001 Wardle has not been a member of any political party. From time to time he is consulted on immigration controls. He voted Leave in the 2016 referendum.

== Personal life ==
Charles and Lesley Wardle live in Cranbrook, Kent. Their daughter, Dr Sarah Wardle is an academic and poet with five collections of poetry published by Bloodaxe Books.

Wardle is a member of the Travellers Club and the Farmers Club. He is a member of The Pilgrims and is a Fellow of the Royal Geographical Society.

Parliament of the United Kingdom
New constituency	Member of Parliament for Bexhill and Battle; 1983–2001	Succeeded by Greg Barker
