= The Condé Nast College of Fashion & Design =

British design school

Coordinates: 51°30′51″N 0°07′51″W

The Condé Nast College of Fashion and Design
- Established: April 2013
- Location: London, United Kingdom
- Address: 30 Bedford Square, WC1B 3EE London, UK
- Website: http://www.condenastcollege.ac.uk

The Condé Nast College of Fashion & Design is the first educational establishment of the Condé Nast Publications Ltd. in London, UK.

== History ==
The Condé Nast College of Fashion and Design, established by Condé Nast Britain's Managing Director, Nicholas Coleridge, opened in April 2013.

== The College ==
The College is accredited by the University of Buckingham and the Quality Assurance Agency for Higher Education (QAA).

The College delivers following courses: Vogue Foundation Programme, BA (Hons) Fashion Communication & Industry Practice, MA Fashion Communication, MA Luxury Brand Strategy & Business, MA Entrepreneurship: Fashion & Creative Industries, MA Fashion Styling, MA Creative Direction for Fashion Media, MA Fashion Journalism & Editorial Direction MA Fashion Media Strategy MA Luxury Brand Management in partnership with Richmond University.

Short Courses: Certificate in Fashion Media, Certificate in Fashion Marketing, Certificate in Fashion Communication Vogue Intensive Summer Course, 5 Days of Fashion Journalism, 5 Days of Fashion Business, 5 Days of Fashion Styling, 5 Days of Creative Direction, Vogue Teen Festival*only for 16–17 years old*

Insights Online 6–8 weeks Courses: Fashion Styling, Fashion Branding & Communication, Creative Direction, Digital Content Creation.

Some of the guest speakers included: Edward Enninful OBE, editor-in-chief British Vogue and European editorial director of Condé Nast, Martina Fuchs, international TV Anchor, Business Journalist, Event Moderator, Expert on China and the Middle East, William Banks-Blaney, fashion expert; Victoria Beckham, fashion designer; Lucinda Chambers, fashion director of British Vogue; Nicholas Coleridge, Managing Director of Condé Nast Britain and President of Condé Nast International; Sarah Doukas, founder of Storm Model Management; Jo Elvin, editor of Glamour magazine; Henry Holland, fashion designer; Tommy Hilfiger, fashion designer; Anya Hindmarch, fashion accessories designer; Caroline Issa, magazine publisher and consultant; Dylan Jones, journalist, author and editor of British GQ; Yasmin Le Bon, model; Julien Macdonald, fashion designer; Tamara Mellon, fashion designer and former chief creative officer of Jimmy Choo; Suzy Menkes, journalist, fashion critic and Vogue International Editor; Bertrand Michaud, Managing Director of Hermès UK; Roland Mouret, fashion designer; Kate Phelan, Creative Director of Topshop and Senior Contributing Fashion Editor at British Vogue; Caroline Rush, Chief Executive of the British Fashion Council; Alexandra Shulman, journalist, author and editor-in-chief of British Vogue; Alice Temperley, fashion designer; Matthew Williamson, fashion designer;

In 2013, the College was listed as number 53 in the PPA Magazine list of '100 Great Magazine Moments'.

== Overseas ==
Condé Nast International runs several ventures in education, including in Spain where the Vogue Masters in Communication, Fashion and Beauty is operated in conjunction with University Carlos III.
