= Huw Merriman =

British politician (born 1973)

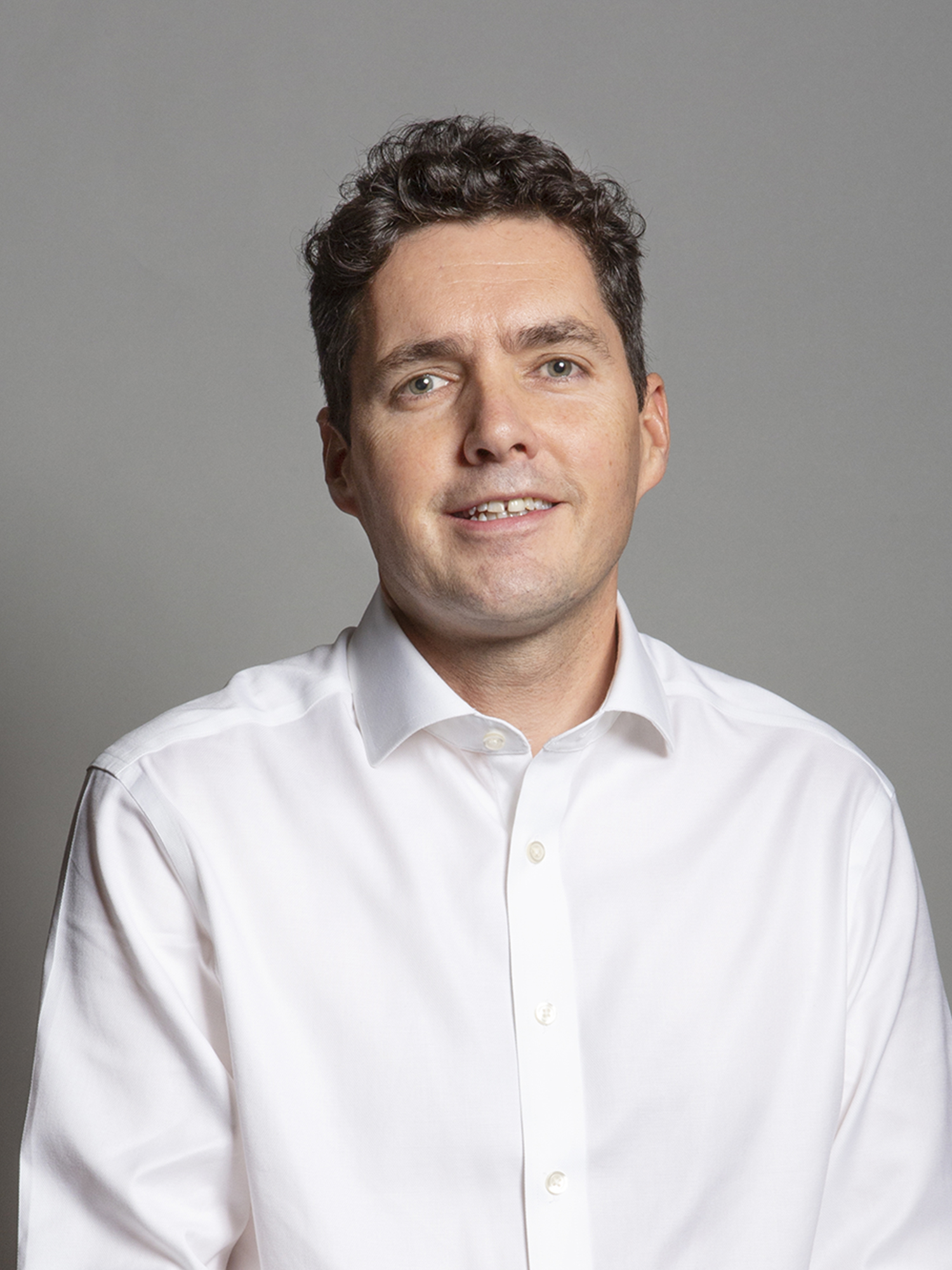
- Official portrait, 2019

Minister of State for Rail and HS2
- In office 27 October 2022 – 5 July 2024
- Prime Minister: Rishi Sunak
- Preceded by: Kevin Foster
- Succeeded by: The Lord Hendy of Richmond Hill

Chair of the Transport Select Committee
- In office 29 January 2020 – 27 October 2022
- Preceded by: Lilian Greenwood
- Succeeded by: Iain Stewart

Member of Parliament for Bexhill and Battle
- In office 7 May 2015 – 30 May 2024
- Preceded by: Greg Barker
- Succeeded by: Kieran Mullan

Personal details
- Born: Huw William Merriman; 13 July 1973 (age 53) Brackley, Northamptonshire, England
- Party: Conservative
- Spouse: Victoria Powdrill (m. 2001; sep. 2019)
- Children: 4
- Education: University College, University of Durham; City Law School
- Website: Official website

Huw William Merriman (born 13 July 1973) is a British politician who served as the Member of Parliament (MP) for Bexhill and Battle in East Sussex from 2015 to 2024. A member of the Conservative Party, he served as Minister of State for Rail and HS2 from October 2022 until July 2024. He previously chaired the Transport Select Committee between January 2020 and October 2022. Prior to his parliamentary career, Merriman was a barrister and a local councillor.

== Early life and career ==
Merriman was born on 13 July 1973 in Brackley, Northamptonshire, to Richard and Ann Merriman. His father was a local council worker and his mother was a teacher. He grew up in Buckingham and attended Buckingham County Secondary Modern School and Aylesbury College. Merriman studied law at Durham University, where he was president of the Young Conservatives branch in 1994.

After graduating, he qualified as a barrister at the City Law School. He initially worked in criminal law before working in financial law for 17 years. His last role was as managing director of a team of lawyers tasked with unwinding the Lehman Brothers' European estate following the financial services firm's collapse in 2008.

== Political career ==
He moved to East Sussex in 2006 and was elected to Wealden District Council for the Rotherfield ward in 2007 and was re-elected in 2011. Merriman stood as a Conservative candidate for North East Derbyshire in the 2010 general election. He came second to the incumbent Labour MP Natascha Engel.

Merriman was selected as the prospective parliamentary candidate (PPC) for Bexhill and Battle in November 2014. Other contenders for the seat included future MPs Suella Fernandes (now Braverman) and James Cleverly. He won the seat in the 2015 general election with 30,245 votes and a majority of 20,075 (36.4%). During the 2015–2017 parliament, he sat on the Procedure Committee. From July 2017 to August 2018, he was a parliamentary private secretary (PPS) in the Department for Work and Pensions. Merriman was appointed as PPS to then Chancellor of the Exchequer Philip Hammond.

He supported the UK remaining within the European Union (EU) in the 2016 UK EU membership referendum. Merriman voted for then Prime Minister Theresa May's Brexit withdrawal agreement in early 2019. In the indicative votes held on 27 March, he voted for a referendum on the Brexit withdrawal agreement.

Merriman supported Jeremy Hunt in the 2019 Conservative leadership election. He voted for Prime Minister Boris Johnson's Brexit withdrawal agreement in October 2019.

Merriman was the chair of the Transport Select Committee between January 2020 and October 2022. He had previously been a member of the committee since September 2017 and was also a member of the Liaison Committee between May 2020 and October 2022. Merriman was appointed as Minister of State for Rail and HS2 in October 2022. He stood down at the 2024 general election.

== Post-parliamentary career ==
In October 2024, Merriman was appointed as Chair of the Liverpool to Manchester Rail Board. Merriman was one of three former MPs referred to the Cabinet Office in December 2024 for failure to correctly follow guidance from the Advisory Committee on Business Appointments issued to former government MPs seeking employment once they leave office. In October 2025, he was appointed as the chair of the High Speed Rail Group.

== Personal life ==
Merriman married Victoria Powdrill in 2001 and they have three daughters. Merriman and his wife formally separated in 2019.

Parliament of the United Kingdom
Preceded by Gregory Barker	Member of Parliament for Bexhill and Battle; 2015–2024	Succeeded by Kieran Mullan
