= Heroic Imagination Project =

Research and education organization

The Heroic Imagination Project (HIP) is a non-profit research and education organization dedicated to promoting heroism in everyday life.

HIP operates on the principle that heroism is accessible to all and that each of us has the extraordinary potential to act with courage, integrity, and compassion. The organization focuses on preparing its students to take effective action in challenging situations, whether that requires proactive, everyday heroic action or rare and reactive heroic action.

HIP conducts training events and workshops that tackle bystander behavior, bias, and challenge navigation in businesses, NGOs, and schools across the globe. In the years following the COVID-19 pandemic, the organization moved much of its activity online, providing the HIP Hero Club curriculum to secondary schools across the world, training over 200 students in the asynchronous, virtual Level One Hero Training Course, and holding monthly HIP World Chats with the international heroism education community. In 2022 the organization resumed in-person events, introducing HIP Summits as a new way for heroes in training to connect.

HIP also conducts research and curates knowledge about heroism and related pro-social traits and behaviors. Noteworthy publications related to heroism by the HIP Board of Directors have been written in the last decade such as:

- Riches, Brian R.; Langdon, Matt; and Kohen, Ari (2020) "Ethical Concerns of Heroism Training," Heroism Science: Vol. 5: Iss. 2, Article 1.DOI: 10.26736/hs.2020.02.01
- Kohen, A., Riches, B., & Sólo, A. (2024). I Am Not a Hero: How Heroic Action Divorces the Hero from the Political Community. Journal of Humanistic Psychology, 0(0). https://doi.org/10.1177/00221678241242506
- Kohen, Ari. "Tony Stark and the Classical Heroism of the Marvel Cinematic Universe." The Politics of the Marvel Cinematic Universe, edited by Nicholas Carnes and Lilly J. Goren, University Press of Kansas, 2023, pp. 36–51. JSTOR, https://doi.org/10.2307/j.ctv36tpjtk.7. Accessed 30 Sept. 2024.
- Zimbardo, P.G., Kohen, A. (2023). Heroic Imagination Project (HIP). In: Encyclopedia of Heroism Studies. Springer, Cham. https://doi.org/10.1007/978-3-031-17125-3_275-1
- Riches, Brian R. (2023) Hero Training Programs. In: Encyclopedia of Heroism Studies. Springer, Cham. https://doi.org/10.1007/978-3-031-17125-3_275-1
- Riches, Brian R. (2023) Measuring Heroism. In: Encyclopedia of Heroism Studies. Springer, Cham. https://doi.org/10.1007/978-3-031-17125-3_275-1
- Langdon, M. (2021). The Hero Handbook. Magination Press.

== History ==
- 2006 - Dr. Philip Zimbardo and Dr. Zeno Franco publish The Banality of Heroism, a seminal work that suggests that heroism was not a rare feature of human nature but, rather, possible for everyone.
- 2008 - Dr. Phillip Zimbardo gives The Psychology of Evil TED Talk.
- 2010 - HIP is incorporated as a 501 © 3 in California, United States.
- 2011 - HIP produces its first evidence-based curriculum “The Growth Mindset” and “The Bystander Effect”. HIP develops a train-the-trainer framework.
- 2015 - HIP develops a membership model, licensing its curriculum to individuals and institutions.
- 2017 - HIP introduces its first virtual learning services.
- 2018 - HIP publishes its "Reducing Bias" curriculum.
- 2020 - HIP and the Hero Construction Company formally merge.
- 2022 - HIP holds its first HIP-sponsored Hero Round Table Conference and its first HIP Summit.
- 2023 - HIP introduces its first asynchronous virtual services.

== Training and lecturing activity ==
2013

- Gothenburg, Sweden
- Make a Difference Foundation, Hong Kong, China
- Tijuana, Mexico
- Western Reserve Academy, Hudson, Ohio, United States,
- Massanutten Military Academy - Woodstock, Virginia, United States
- American Psychological Association National Conference, Honolulu, Hawaii, United States

2014

- Hosek Tere - Budapest, Hungary
- Hero Town USA - Flint, Michigan, United States
- Projekt Bohaterskiej Wyobraźni, Poland
- Green School - Bali

2015

- Hero Town Geelong - Geelong, Victoria, Australia

2016

- Palo Alto High School, Palo Alto, California, United States
- Doughtery Vally High School - San Ramon, California, United States
- Tara Center - Tehran, Iran

2017

- YMCA Urban Services - San Francisco, California, United States
- Police Orientation Preparation Program - Los Angeles, California, United States
- Palo Alto Training University - Palo Alto - California, United States
- Pasadena City College - Pasadena, California, United States
- Stanford Principal Fellows - Stanford, California, United States
- Florida State College at Jacksonville - Jacksonville, Florida, United States
- University of Calgary - Calgary, Alberta, Canada
- Catholic University of Porto - Porto, Portugal
- Doha College/Passare Consultancy - Qatar
- Inspire to Aspire at the University of California, Davis - Davis, California, United States
- Virtual Trainings

2018

- Folsom Lake College, Folsom, California, United States
- Ford Motor Company
- California State University, Bakersfield - Bakersfield, California, United States
- University of the Faroe Islands - Faroe Islands
- Virtual Trainings
- Keynote - Mexico City, Mexico

2019

- California State University, Bakersfield - Bakersfield, California, United States
- Virtual Trainings
- Charles University - Czech Republic
- Crescent School - Toronto, Ontario
- DOX Centre for Contemporary Art - Prague, Czech Republic
- Lewis & Clark College - Portland, Oregon, United States

2022

- HIP introduces its virtual, asynchronous Level One Hero Training Course
- HIP Summit - Salerno, Italy
- The first HIP-sponsored Hero Round Table is held in Brigton, Michigan, United States

2023

- HIP Summit - Salerno, Italy

2024

- HIP introduces its virtual, synchronous Level Two Hero Training Course
- Humanists of Greater Portland - Virtual Keynote
