= William Banks-Blaney =

Vintage fashion entrepreneur

- Born: William Banks-Blaney; England
- Occupations: Fashion expert and founder of williamvintage
- Website: www.williamvintage.com

William Banks-Blaney is a fashion expert and the original founder and CEO of vintage brand, William Vintage, before he stepped down from his position in 2017. He has been referred to as "The Vintage King" by Vogue, Harper's Bazaar, The Independent, and The New York Times, among others.

== Education and Charitable Work ==
During his time as the CEO of William Vintage, Banks-Blaney was a visiting Fellow at the London College of Fashion, a guest lecturer at The Condé Nast College of Fashion & Design, style ambassador to American Express, and a lecturer at both the Victoria and Albert Museum and the Fashion and Textile Museum.

Barks-Blaney was also a Fashion Patron of Oxfam, creating master classes shown on Vogue. He also directed a campaign with Guy Aroch.

== Publishing ==
In September 2013, Quadrille Publishing announced it had signed Banks-Blaney for his first book, 25 Dresses, a hardback book focusing on the evolution of women's fashion and the legacy of haute couture in the 21st century. The book was formally launched at the Hay Festival of Literature and Arts in May 2015.

== Personal life ==
Banks-Blaney reportedly had a previous relationship with Gregory Barker, the former UK Climate Change Minister. In October 2006, it was announced that Barker had left his wife for Banks-Blaney, stirring up intense media scrutiny.

Banks-Blaney's lawyers from Carter-Ruck soon issued a statement regarding the article, saying that Banks-Blaney won damages from the publishers of Evening Standard and The Sun over false allegations of his relationships. The newspapers subsequently apologized.
