= Trust (British political party) =

- Leader: Stuart Wheeler
- Founded: 2010
- Dissolved: 2011
- Headquarters: 83 Victoria Street; London SW1H 0HW

Website
- http://thetrustparty.co.uk/

Trust was a minor political party in the United Kingdom formed on 26 March 2010 by Stuart Wheeler in the wake of the Westminster expenses scandal. It unsuccessfully fielded two candidates at the 2010 general election.

== 2010 general election ==
Both of the party's candidates were former Conservatives.

Stuart Wheeler, who contested the Sussex constituency of Bexhill and Battle, was a businessman who donated £5 million to the Conservatives in 2001. He was expelled from the Conservative Party for donating £100,000 to United Kingdom Independence Party in 2009. Wheeler alleged that his opponent in Bexhill and Battle, Gregory Barker MP, escaped criticism from David Cameron over his expenses as an ally of the Conservative Party leader. Barker called Wheeler's campaign "an attempt to cash in on genuine public concerns about the Parliamentary expenses scandal by peddling the most extraordinary untruths about my own Parliamentary claims and expenditure."

The party's other candidate was Douglas Taylor. He had been a Conservative candidate at the Western Isles in 2001, and in Perth and North Perthshire in 2005. Taylor stood again on the Trust Party ticket in Perth and North Perthshire.

=== Election results ===
General Election 2010: Bexhill and Battle
Party	Candidate	Votes	%	±%
Conservative	Gregory Barker	28,147	51.6	−2.6
Liberal Democrats	Mary Varrall	15,267	28.0	+5.3
Labour	James Royston	6,524	12.0	−5.9
Trust	Stuart Wheeler	2,699	4.9	N/A
BNP	Neil Jackson	1,950	3.6	N/A
Majority		12,880	23.6	−7.9
Turnout		54,587	68.9	+2.1
Conservative hold		Swing	−4.0	

General Election 2010: Perth and North Perthshire
Party	Candidate	Votes	%	±%
SNP	Pete Wishart	19,118	39.6	+5.9
Conservative	Peter Lyburn	14,739	30.5	+0.2
Labour	Jamie Glackin	7,923	16.4	−2.3
Liberal Democrats	Peter Barrett	5,954	12.3	−3.8
Trust	Douglas Taylor	534	1.1	N/A
Majority		4,379	9.1	+5.8
Turnout		48,268	66.9	+3.0
SNP hold		Swing	+2.9	

== Politics ==
The party's policies included introducing a parliamentary court with the power to jail MPs who commit fraud, ending MPs' second-home allowances, 'exposure of false claims' about global warming, promoting marriage, improving treatment of wounded soldiers, reducing the power of the European Union and preventing torture of suspected terrorists.

== Dissolution ==
The party was dissolved soon after the 2010 election. One set of accounts was submitted to the Electoral Commission noting that the party had no members and no cash or fixed assets, having been financed by private donations, the balance of which had been repaid to the donors. The accounts noted that the party "won little support in the constituencies and decided not to continue". In January 2011 Wheeler joined the United Kingdom Independence Party as treasurer.
