= Bexhill and Battle =

UK Parliament constituency (since 1983)

Coordinates: 50.886°N 0.470°E

- County constituency for the House of Commons
- Boundaries since 2024
- Boundary of Bexhill and Battle in South East England
- County: East Sussex
- Population: 100,727 (2011 census)
- Electorate: 70,869 (2023)
- Major settlements: Battle, Bexhill, Pevensey

Current constituency
- Created: 1983
- Member of Parliament: Kieran Mullan (Conservative)
- Seats: One
- Created from: Rye; Eastbourne

Bexhill and Battle (/ˈbɛkshɪl/) is a constituency (Note: A county constituency (for the purposes of election expenses and type of returning officer)) in East Sussex represented in the House of Commons of the UK Parliament since 2024 by Kieran Mullan of the Conservative Party. (Note: As with all constituencies, the constituency elects one Member of Parliament (MP) by the first past the post system of election at least every five years.)

== Constituency profile ==
The Bexhill and Battle constituency is located in East Sussex. It lies mostly within the Rother local government district and partly within the Wealden district. The constituency contains the coastal area between Bexhill-on-Sea and Pevensey Bay and extensive inland rural areas within the High Weald National Landscape. Bexhill-on-Sea is the largest settlement in the constituency with a population of around 44,000. Other settlements include the small town of Battle and the villages of Robertsbridge and Ticehurst.

Bexhill-on-Sea is a seaside resort town and Battle is known for its association with the 1066 Battle of Hastings, which took place where the town now stands. Residents of the constituency are significantly older than the national average and are less wealthy than other parts of South East England. White people make up 96% of the population. At the most recent district council election in 2023, voters in Bexhill-on-Sea elected primarily Labour Party and independent councillors, whilst seats in the rural parts of the constituency were mostly won by Conservatives and Liberal Democrats. A majority of voters in Bexhill and Battle, estimated at 59%, supported leaving the European Union in the 2016 referendum.

== Notable representatives ==
The seat's first MP, Charles Wardle, served as a junior Home Office minister in the government of John Major; Wardle had the Conservative whip removed shortly before the 2001 general election. The seat was held by Gregory Barker from 2001 until 2015; Barker was a junior minister at the Department for Energy and Climate Change between the formation of the Conservative-Liberal Democrat coalition after the 2010 general election and the major government reshuffle of July 2014, when he resigned and announced his intention to retire from Parliament at the next general election.

== Political history ==
The constituency was created in 1983 as the replacement for the Rye parliamentary constituency. At the 2015 general election, Huw Merriman was elected, and was re-elected in the 2017 general election.

In June 2016, an estimated 57.7% of local adults voting in the EU membership referendum chose to leave the European Union instead of to remain. This was matched in two January 2018 votes in Parliament by its MP.

== Boundaries ==
Map of boundaries 2010–2024

1983–2010:

- The District of Rother wards of Ashburnham, Battle, Beckley and Peasmarsh, Bodiam and Ewhurst, Brede and Udimore, Burwash, Catsfield and Crowhurst, Central, Collington, Etchingham and Hurst Green, Northiam, Old Town, Sackville, St Mark's, St Michael's, St Stephen's, Salehurst, Sedlescombe and Whatlington, Sidley, Ticehurst, and Westfield
- The District of Wealden wards of Herstmonceux, Ninfield, and Pevensey and Westham.

2010–2024:

- The District of Rother wards of Battle Town, Central, Collington, Crowhurst, Darwell, Ewhurst and Sedlescombe, Kewhurst, Old Town, Rother Levels, Sackville, St Mark's, St Michael's, St Stephen's, Salehurst, Sidley, and Ticehurst and Etchingham
- The District of Wealden wards of Cross In Hand/Five Ashes, Heathfield East, Heathfield North and Central, Herstmonceux, Ninfield and Hooe with Wartling, and Pevensey and Westham.

2024–present:

Further to the 2023 review of Westminster constituencies which came into effect for the 2024 general election, the constituency is now composed of the following (as they existed on 1 December 2020):

- The District of Rother wards of: Bexhill Central; Bexhill Collington; Bexhill Kewhurst; Bexhill Old Town & Worsham; Bexhill Pebsham & St. Michaels; Bexhill Sackville; Bexhill St. Marks; Bexhill St. Stephens; Bexhill Sidley; Brede & Udimore; Burwash & the Weald; Catsfield & Crowhurst; Hurst Green & Ticehurst; North Battle, Netherfield & Whatlington; Northern Rother; Robertsbridge; Sedlescombe & Westfield; South Battle & Telham.
- The District of Wealden wards of: Herstmonceux & Pevensey Levels; Pevensey Bay.

To bring the electorate within the permitted range, western areas, including the town of Heathfield, were transferred to the new constituency of Sussex Weald. Other minor changes to take account of revised ward boundaries.

== Members of Parliament ==
Rye prior to 1983

Election	Member	Party
1983	Charles Wardle	Conservative
2001	Charles Wardle	Independent
2001	Gregory Barker	Conservative
2015	Huw Merriman	Conservative
2024	Kieran Mullan	Conservative

== Elections ==
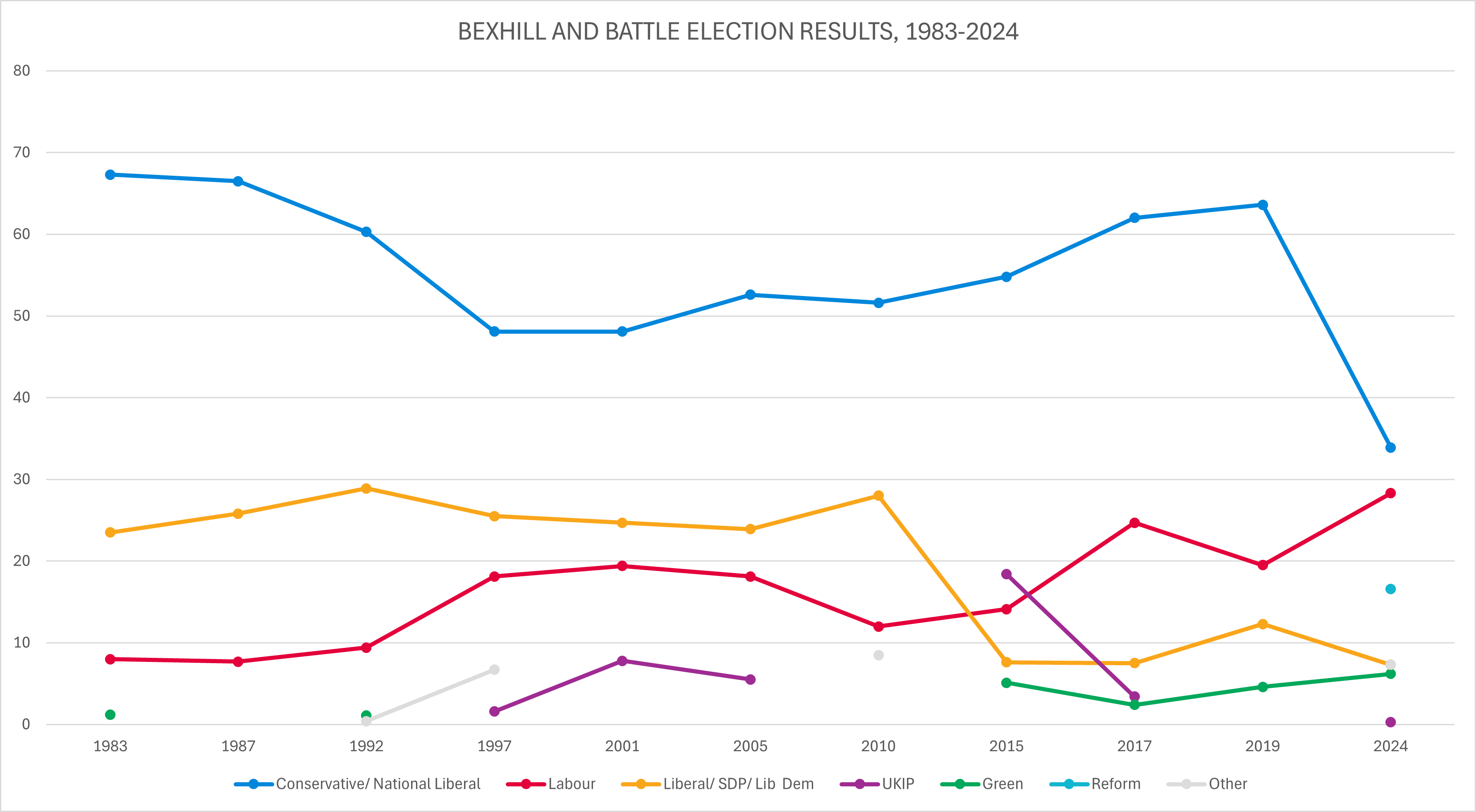
Election results 1983–2024

=== Elections in the 2020s ===
General election 2024: Bexhill and Battle
Party	Candidate	Votes	%	±%
Conservative	Kieran Mullan	16,186	33.9	−27.9
Labour	Christine Bayliss	13,529	28.3	+7.5
Reform	Ian Gribbin	7,929	16.6	N/A
Liberal Democrats	Becky Jones	3,473	7.3	−6.1
Green	Jonathan Kent	2,972	6.2	+2.1
Independent	Abul Azad	2,206	4.6	N/A
Independent	Jeff Newnham	769	1.6	N/A
Party of Women	Julia Long	332	0.7	N/A
Ind. Network	Nigel Jacklin	210	0.4	N/A
UKIP	Colin Sullivan	144	0.3	N/A
Majority		2,657	5.6	−38.5
Turnout		47,750	66.4	−3.8
Conservative hold		Swing	−17.7	

=== Elections in the 2010s ===
2019 notional result
Party	Vote	%
Conservative	30,716	61.8
Labour	10,332	20.8
Liberal Democrats	6,658	13.4
Green	2,031	4.1
Turnout	49,737	70.2
Electorate	70,869	

General election 2019: Bexhill & Battle
Party	Candidate	Votes	%	±%
Conservative	Huw Merriman	37,590	63.6	+1.6
Labour	Christine Bayliss	11,531	19.5	−5.2
Liberal Democrats	Martin Saunders	7,280	12.3	+4.8
Green	Jonathan Kent	2,692	4.6	+2.2
Majority		26,059	44.1	+6.8
Turnout		59,093	72.1	−1.0
Conservative hold		Swing	+3.4	

General election 2017: Bexhill & Battle
Party	Candidate	Votes	%	±%
Conservative	Huw Merriman	36,854	62.0	+7.2
Labour	Christine Bayliss	14,689	24.7	+10.6
Liberal Democrats	Joel Kemp	4,485	7.5	−0.1
UKIP	Geoffrey Bastin	2,006	3.4	−15.0
Green	Jonathan Kent	1,438	2.4	−2.7
Majority		22,165	37.3	+0.9
Turnout		59,472	73.1	+3.0
Conservative hold		Swing	−1.7	

General election 2015: Bexhill and Battle
Party	Candidate	Votes	%	±%
Conservative	Huw Merriman	30,245	54.8	+3.2
UKIP	Geoffrey Bastin	10,170	18.4	N/A
Labour	Michelle Thew	7,797	14.1	+2.1
Liberal Democrats	Rachel Sadler	4,199	7.6	−20.4
Green	Jonathan Kent	2,807	5.1	N/A
Majority		20,075	36.4	+12.8
Turnout		55,218	70.1	+1.2
Conservative hold		Swing		

This constituency underwent boundary changes between the 2005 and 2010 general elections and thus change in share of vote is based on a notional calculation.

General election 2010: Bexhill and Battle
Party	Candidate	Votes	%	±%
Conservative	Gregory Barker	28,147	51.6	−2.6
Liberal Democrats	Mary Varrall	15,267	28.0	+5.3
Labour	James Royston	6,524	12.0	−5.9
Trust	Stuart Wheeler	2,699	4.9	N/A
BNP	Neil Jackson	1,950	3.6	N/A
Majority		12,880	23.6	−7.9
Turnout		54,587	68.9	+2.1
Conservative hold		Swing	−4.0	

=== Elections in the 2000s ===
General election 2005: Bexhill and Battle
Party	Candidate	Votes	%	±%
Conservative	Gregory Barker	24,629	52.6	+4.5
Liberal Democrats	Mary Varrall	11,180	23.9	−0.8
Labour	Michael Jones	8,457	18.1	−1.3
UKIP	Anthony Smith	2,568	5.5	−2.3
Majority		13,449	28.7	+5.3
Turnout		46,834	67.2	+2.3
Conservative hold		Swing	+2.7	

General election 2001: Bexhill and Battle
Party	Candidate	Votes	%	±%
Conservative	Gregory Barker	21,555	48.1	±0.0
Liberal Democrats	Stephen Hardy	11,052	24.7	−0.8
Labour	Anne Moore-Williams	8,702	19.4	+1.3
UKIP	Nigel Farage	3,474	7.8	+6.2
Majority		10,503	23.4	+0.8
Turnout		44,783	64.9	−9.6
Conservative hold		Swing	+0.4	

=== Elections in the 1990s ===
General election 1997: Bexhill and Battle
Party	Candidate	Votes	%	±%
Conservative	Charles Wardle	23,570	48.1	−12.2
Liberal Democrats	Kathryn M. Field	12,470	25.5	−3.4
Labour	Robert D. Beckwith	8,866	18.1	+8.7
Referendum	Vanessa Thompson	3,302	6.7	N/A
UKIP	John Pankhurst	786	1.6	N/A
Majority		11,100	22.6	−8.8
Turnout		48,994	74.5	−4.6
Conservative hold		Swing	−4.4	

General election 1992: Bexhill and Battle
Party	Candidate	Votes	%	±%
Conservative	Charles Wardle	31,380	60.3	−6.2
Liberal Democrats	Susan M. Prochak	15,023	28.9	+3.1
Labour	Frank W. Taylor	4,883	9.4	+1.7
Green	Jonathan L. Prus	594	1.1	N/A
Independent	Mary F. Smith	190	0.4	N/A
Majority		16,357	31.4	−9.3
Turnout		52,070	79.1	+1.7
Conservative hold		Swing	−4.6	

=== Elections in the 1980s ===
General election 1987: Bexhill and Battle
Party	Candidate	Votes	%	±%
Conservative	Charles Wardle	33,570	66.5	−0.8
SDP	Robert Kiernan	13,051	25.8	+2.3
Labour	Derek Watts	3,903	7.7	−0.3
Majority		20,519	40.7	−3.1
Turnout		50,524	77.4	+4.5
Conservative hold		Swing	−1.6	

General election 1983: Bexhill and Battle
Party	Candidate	Votes	%	±%
Conservative	Charles Wardle	30,329	67.3	
Liberal	Paul Smith	10,583	23.5	
Labour	Ian Pearson	3,587	8.0	
Ecology	Anne Rix	538	1.2	
Majority		19,746	43.8	
Turnout		45,037	72.9	
Conservative win (new seat)				

== See also ==
- Rye parliamentary constituency
- parliamentary constituencies in East Sussex
- List of parliamentary constituencies in the South East England (region)

== Sources ==
- Election result, 2005 (BBC)
- Election results, 1997 – 2001 (BBC)
- Election results, 1997 – 2001 (Election Demon)
- Election results, 1983 – 1992 (Election Demon) (Result is incorrect for 1992)
- Election results, 1992 – 2005 (Guardian)
