= Stuart Wheeler =

British businessman and politician (1935–2020)

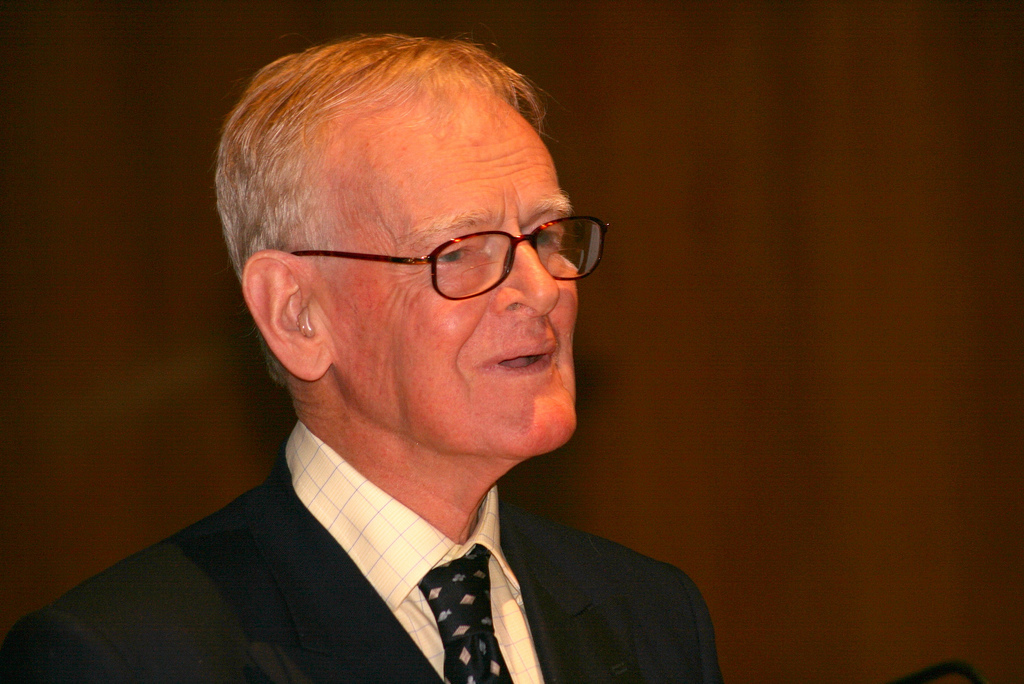
- Wheeler in 2009

Leader of the Trust Party
- In office 2010–2011
- Preceded by: Position established
- Succeeded by: Position dissolved

Personal details
- Born: 30 January 1935 London, England
- Died: 23 July 2020 (aged 85) Chilham, Kent, England
- Education: Eton College
- Alma mater: Christ Church, Oxford
- Occupations: Financier, political activist, barrister
- Political party: UK Independence (c. 2011–2020); Trust (2010); Conservative (before 2001–2009)
- Spouse: Tessa Codrington (m. 1963; died 2016)
- Children: 3, including Jacquetta

John Stuart Wheeler (30 January 1935 – 23 July 2020) was a British financier, gambler and political activist. He made his fortune as the founder of the spread betting firm IG Index in 1974, but was best known for his political activism, being a major donor to the Conservative Party and treasurer of the UK Independence Party from 2011 to 2014.

== Early life and career ==
Wheeler was adopted just before his second birthday by an American, Alexander Wheeler, a former Army officer and heir to a banking fortune, and his young wife Betty, daughter of a baronet, Sir John Gibbons. The couple also adopted a little girl, Susan, on the same day.

Wheeler spent his early years growing up on the Leighon Estate in Manaton, Devon. He was educated at Eton College. He did his national service with the Welsh Guards, before studying at Christ Church, Oxford, from where he graduated with a second-class degree in law. He practised law as a barrister, before becoming an investment banker. However, Wheeler found his niche through IG Index, which pioneered spread betting. Originally, the company was launched to allow Britons to speculate on gold, when foreign exchange controls made it exorbitantly expensive to actually buy it.

== Politics ==
=== Conservative Party ===
Although a successful businessman, Wheeler was not a well-known figure nationally until he donated £5m to the Conservative Party during the 2001 election campaign. This was the largest single donation ever made to a political party in the United Kingdom, until that of Frank Hester.

In January 2008, Wheeler brought an action against the government, represented by the Prime Minister, Gordon Brown, and the Foreign Secretary, David Miliband, over the government's process of ratification of the Treaty of Lisbon. The action sought to prevent the government from completing ratification of the treaty, on the grounds that it was illegal for a government to breach the public's legitimate expectation of adherence to manifesto and other commitments. The government, along with the Conservatives and Liberal Democrats, had pledged in their 2005 manifestos to hold a referendum on the European Constitution, which Wheeler held did not have "significant or material differences" from the Treaty of Lisbon. This action failed.

Wheeler was seen as belonging to the right wing of the Conservative Party. He supported Liam Fox in the 2005 leadership contest, and switched his support to David Davis against David Cameron in the final run-off. He was critical of the leadership of David Cameron during its first few months.

On 28 March 2009, Wheeler donated £100,000 to the UK Independence Party (UKIP) after criticising David Cameron's stance towards the Treaty of Lisbon and the European Union. He said, "If they kick me out I will understand. I will be very sorry about it but it won't alter my stance." The following day he was expelled from the Conservative Party.

=== The Trust Party ===
On 29 March 2010, Wheeler announced that he was forming a new political party to be called the Trust Party and that he would run for the Bexhill and Battle seat. The seat was won by Gregory Barker for the Conservatives, but Wheeler polled 4.9% and therefore lost his deposit. The new party also fielded a candidate in Perth and North Perthshire, where it won 1.1% of the vote.

=== UKIP treasurer ===
In 2011, Wheeler was appointed treasurer of UKIP to spearhead fundraising in advance of the 2014 European elections. His appointment was seen as a blow for the Conservatives because of his network of contacts. Party leader Nigel Farage said the move would enable the party to "raise serious money" as a lack of funds was "holding them back".

=== Vote Leave co-treasurer ===
At the launch of the Vote Leave campaign for Brexit in October 2015, Wheeler was reported to be one of the new group's three major donors, with Peter Cruddas and John Mills; the three men were appointed as joint co-treasurers.

== Personal life ==
Wheeler was called an "obsessive" gambler, taking a keen interest in card and risk games and having played bridge with Lord Lucan on 6 November 1974, two days before his disappearance, and with Omar Sharif, as well as being a regular competitor in World Series of Poker championships.

His wife, photographer Tessa Codrington, died in 2016. They had three daughters, including model Jacquetta Wheeler.

In June 2020, Wheeler announced that he had stomach cancer with only "six months to live". He died a month later on 23 July 2020, aged 85, at his home Chilham Castle in Kent.
