= Philip Zimbardo =

American social psychologist (1933–2024)

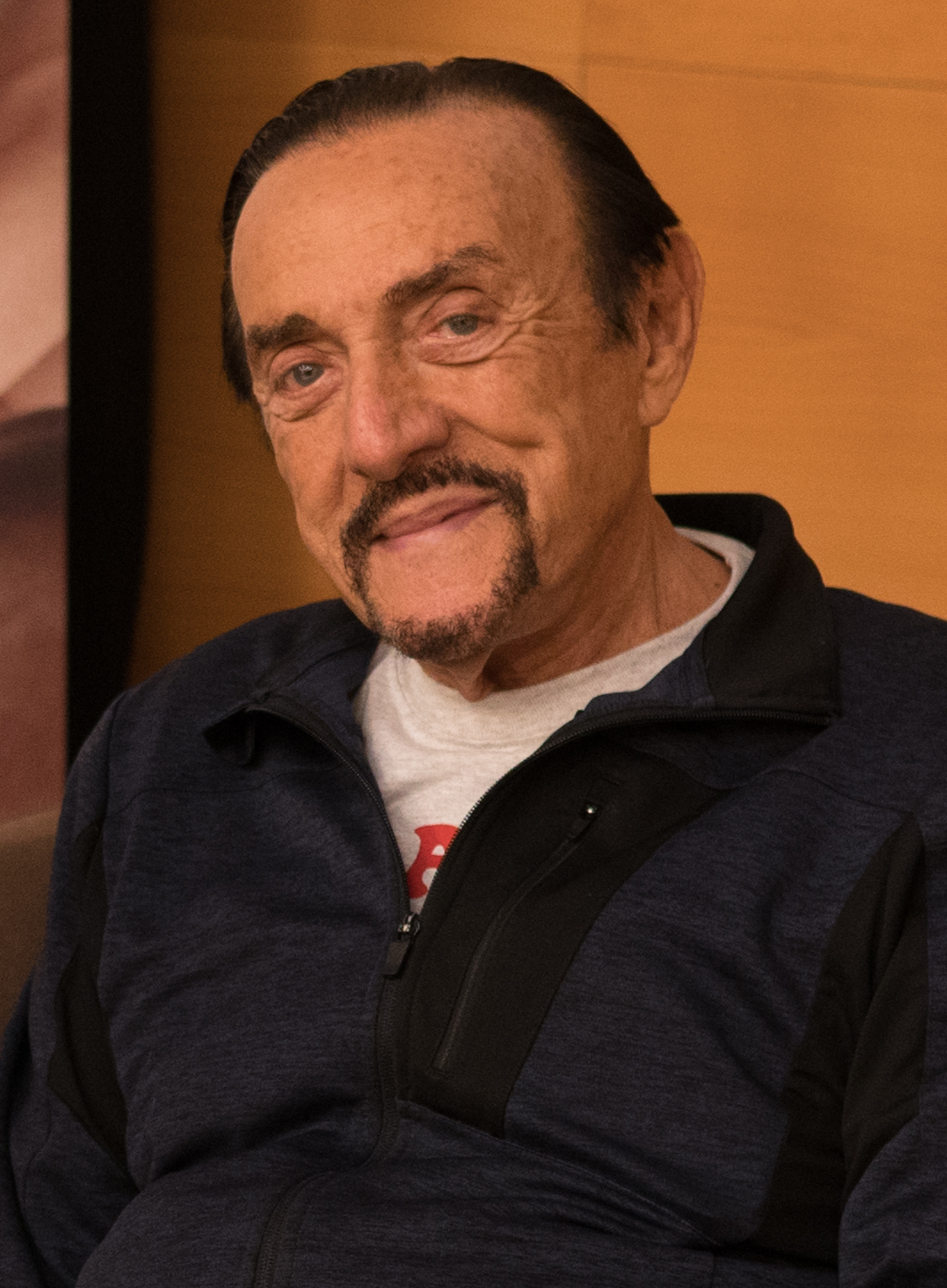
- Zimbardo in 2019
- Born: Philip George Zimbardo; March 23, 1933; New York City, U.S.
- Died: October 14, 2024 (aged 91); San Francisco, California, U.S.
- Education: Brooklyn College (BA); Yale University (MS, PhD)
- Known for: Discovering Psychology series • Stanford prison experiment • Psychology of shyness theory • Time perspective theory • Psychology of heroism
- Notable work: The Lucifer Effect (2007) • The Time Paradox (2008) • Shyness: What It is, What to Do About It (1977) • The Shy Child (1981) • Psychology And Life • Discovering Psychology
- Spouses: Rose Abdelnour (m. 1957; div. 1971) Christina Maslach (m. 1972)
- Website: philipzimbardo.com

Philip George Zimbardo (/zɪmˈbɑːrdoʊ/; March 23, 1933 – October 14, 2024) was an American psychologist and a professor at Stanford University. He was an internationally known educator, researcher, author and media personality in psychology who authored more than 500 articles, chapters, textbooks, and trade books covering a wide range of topics, including time perspective, cognitive dissonance, the psychology of evil, persuasion, cults, deindividuation, shyness, and heroism.

Zimbardo garnered great attention for his 1971 Stanford prison experiment, which was later criticized for its use of methods. He authored various widely used, introductory psychology textbooks for college students, and other notable works, including Shyness, The Lucifer Effect, and The Time Paradox.

Zimbardo was the founder and president of the Heroic Imagination Project, a non-profit organization dedicated to promoting heroism in everyday life by training people how to resist bullying, bystanding, and negative conformity. He pioneered The Stanford Shyness Clinic in the 1970s and offered the earliest comprehensive treatment program for shyness. He was the recipient of numerous honorary degrees and many awards and honors for service, teaching, research, writing, and educational media, including the Carl Sagan Award for Public Understanding of Science for his Discovering Psychology video series. He served as Western Psychological Association president in 1983 and 2001, and American Psychological Association president in 2002.

== Early life and education ==
Zimbardo was born in New York City on March 23, 1933, to a second-generation Sicilian-American immigrant family. Early in life he experienced discrimination and prejudice, growing up poor on welfare in the South Bronx, and being Italian. Zimbardo said these experiences early in life started his curiosity about people's behavior, and later influenced his research in school.

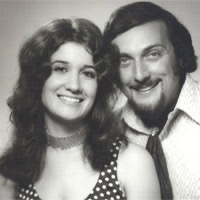
Maslach and Zimbardo in 1972

He survived an early childhood illness and the experience of a long stay at the Willard Parker Hospital, a hospital for children with contagious diseases, where he learned to read. His formal education began in New York Public School 52 and he graduated from James Monroe High School. He was the first member of his family to pursue a college degree.

In 1954, Zimbardo completed his B.A. with a triple major in psychology, sociology, and anthropology from Brooklyn College, where he graduated summa cum laude. He completed his M.S. (1955) and Ph.D. (1959) in psychology from Yale University, where Neal E. Miller was his advisor. While at Yale, he married fellow graduate student Rose Abdelnour; they had a son in 1962 and divorced in 1971.

He taught at Yale from 1959 to 1960. From 1960 to 1967, he was a professor of psychology at New York University College of Arts & Science. From 1967 to 1968, he taught at Columbia University. He joined the faculty at Stanford University in California in 1968 and taught for 50 years there. Following retirement in 2003, he continued to lecture at Stanford and taught at Palo Alto University (former Pacific Graduate School of Psychology) and the Naval Postgraduate School (NPS) in Monterey.

Zimbardo's activism manifested in different ways, such as organizing academic forums called teach-ins on civil rights and racial justice. He organized a walkout at an NYU graduation ceremony to protest the decision to award an honorary degree to Robert McNamara, the U.S. Secretary of Defense at the time, whose involvement in escalating the Vietnam War made him a controversial figure.

In 1972, he married Christina Maslach, who received her doctorate in psychology at Stanford University in 1971 and had played a role in concluding the Stanford Prison Experiment. From his first marriage, he had a son and, from the second, two daughters.

== Teaching and educational media ==
Zimbardo was widely known for popular introductory psychology courses. For decades he authored numerous editions of the introductory psychology textbook Psychology and Life and co-authored Psychology: Core Concepts, which have been foundational for many American undergraduate psychology courses.

Throughout his career, he was committed to "giving psychology away" or making psychology accessible to the public, notably through his PBS television series titled Discovering Psychology, which is used in many college telecourses, and his many bestselling academic and popular publications. Discovering Psychology won an Emmy and awards from the American Psychological Association, the Western Psychological Association, and the Columbus International Film & Video Festival. He sought to bridge the gap between academia and the broader audience by using mass media to communicate his work. He collaborated with Allen Funt, the creator and host of the American hidden-camera show Candid Camera, to produce narrated educational videos that use classic episodes to illustrate key principles of psychology. These Candid Camera Classics programs were created for psychology classes and released on DVD, for use in both introductory psychology and social psychology courses.

Zimbardo, who retired officially in 2003, gave his final lecture, "Exploring Human Nature", on March 7, 2007, on the Stanford campus, celebrating his 50th year of teaching psychology. David Spiegel, professor of psychiatry at the Stanford University School of Medicine, termed Zimbardo "a legendary teacher", saying that "he has changed the way we think about social influences". Colleague Ewart Thomas, professor emeritus of psychology and former dean of the School of Humanities and Sciences at Stanford, noted that Zimbardo was "famous for inspiring many of his students to pursue research and teaching careers in which they, like their mentor, were recognized for their distinguished teaching".

His teaching career was recognized with numerous awards, including Distinguished Teaching Award, New York University (1965), Distinguished Teaching Award for Outstanding Contributions to Education in Psychology, American Psychological Foundation (1975), Phoenix Award for Outstanding Teaching, Stanford Psychology Department Faculty (1984), California Magazine, Best Psychology Teacher in California (1986), The Walter Gores Distinguished Teaching Award, Stanford University (1990), Bing Fellow Outstanding Senior Faculty Teaching Award, Stanford University (1994–1997), Outstanding Teaching Award, Western Psychological Association (1995), Distinguished Teaching Award, Phi Beta Kappa (1998), Robert S. Daniel Teaching Excellence Award, APA Division 2, Society for the Teaching of Psychology (1999), and Dean's Award for Distinguished Teaching, Stanford University (1999–2000).

== Research ==
Philip Zimbardo was a psychologist known for his research in how individual behavior is shaped by social systems, situations and contexts.

=== Attitude change and cognitive dissonance ===
Zimbardo undertook graduate school training in the Yale Attitude Change Program, headed by his mentor, Carl Hovland, an influential psychologist in his own right. This experience inspired a long term interest in the processes of attitude and behavior change produced by persuasion. Zimbardo's work on dissonance began during graduate school and he wrote his dissertation on this topic after being introduced to Leon Festinger's work by his Yale mentors in 1957. He conceptualized dissonance phenomena as the cognitive control of motivation, and demonstrated the power of this approach in a series of experimentally rigorous studies. This dissertation work was published in 1960 in the Journal of abnormal and social psychology. Among other publications on principles of behavior and attitude change, the book he co-authored with Michael Leippe, The Psychology of Attitude Change and Social Influence, part of the McGraw-Hill Series in Social Psychology, covered the relationships existing between social influence, attitude change and human behavior.

=== Mind control ===
Zimbardo's long-term research interests included cultic behavior. He conceived of mind control as a phenomenon encompassing all the ways in which personal, social and institutional forces are exerted to induce compliance, conformity, belief, attitude, and value change in others. After working personally with several members of Jim Jones's Peoples Temple cult who had escaped the massacre of cult members in the Guyana jungle in 1978, Zimbardo became fascinated with the intense psychological context and forces involved in cult recruitment, identification, and internalization, and how they could be resisted.

=== Psychology of evil ===
==== The Lucifer Effect ====
The Lucifer Effect was written in response to the Abu Ghraib torture and prisoner abuse military scandal, which occurred during the United States' invasion of Iraq. With renewed global interest in how the lessons of the Stanford Prison Study illuminate parallel dynamics, Zimbardo posited that, in contrast to the U.S. military's explanation of individual dispositional "bad apples", this was a situational "bad barrel" that shaped soldiers' behavior. With regards to the events that occurred at the Abu Ghraib Detention Center, the defense team—including Gary Myers—argued that it was not the prison guards and interrogators who were at fault for the physical and mental abuse of detainees but the George W. Bush administration policies themselves.

However, this does not deny nor excuse individual accountability. In the book, Zimbardo says that humans cannot be defined as good or evil because they may act as either depending on the situation. He believed that personality characteristics could play a role in how violent or submissive actions are manifested. According to Zimbardo, "Good people can be induced, seduced, and initiated into behaving in evil ways. They can also be led to act in irrational, stupid, self-destructive, antisocial, and mindless ways when they are immersed in 'total situations' that impact human nature in ways that challenge our sense of the stability and consistency of individual personality, of character, and of morality." In The Journal of the American Medical Association, there are seven social processes that grease "the slippery slope of evil":

- Mindlessly taking the first small step
- Dehumanization of others
- De-individuation of self (anonymity)
- Diffusion of personal responsibility
- Blind obedience to authority
- Uncritical conformity to group norms
- Passive tolerance of evil through inaction or indifference

Philip Zimbardo's research on the psychology of evil explores how situational and systemic factors can lead ordinary people to commit harmful or immoral acts, as demonstrated in studies on the dynamics of power, authority, conformity, dehumanization, and moral disengagement.

=== Stanford prison study ===
==== Background ====
In 1971, Zimbardo accepted a tenured position as professor of psychology at Stanford University. With a government grant from the U.S. Office of Naval Research, he performed the Stanford prison experiment in which 24 male college students were selected (from an applicant pool of 75). After a mental health screening, the remaining men were assigned randomly to be "prisoners" or "guards" in a mock prison located in the basement of the psychology building at Stanford. Prisoners were confined to a 6 by 9 feet (1.8 m × 2.7 m) cell with black steel-barred doors. The only furniture in each cell was a cot. Solitary confinement was a small unlit closet. Zimbardo's goal for the Stanford Prison study was to assess the psychological effect on a (randomly assigned) student of becoming a prisoner or prison guard. A 1997 article from the Stanford News Service described the experiment's goals in more detail:

Zimbardo's primary reason for conducting the experiment was to focus on the power of roles, rules, symbols, group identity and situational validation of behavior that generally would repulse ordinary individuals. "I had been conducting research for some years on deindividuation, vandalism and dehumanization that illustrated the ease with which ordinary people could be led to engage in anti-social acts by putting them in situations where they felt anonymous, or they could perceive of others in ways that made them less than human, as enemies or objects," Zimbardo told the Toronto symposium in the summer of 1996.

==== Experiment ====
Zimbardo himself participated with the study, playing the role of "prison superintendent" who could mediate disputes between guards and prisoners. He instructed guards to find ways to dominate the prisoners, not with physical violence, but with other tactics, such as sleep deprivation and punishment with solitary confinement. Later in the experiment, as some guards became more aggressive, taking away prisoners' cots (so that they had to sleep on the floor), and forcing them to use buckets kept in their cells as toilets, and then refusing permission to empty the buckets, neither the other guards nor Zimbardo himself intervened. Knowing that their actions were observed but not rebuked, guards considered that they had implicit approval for such actions.

In later interviews, several guards told interviewers that they knew what Zimbardo wanted to have happen, and they did their best to make that happen. Less than two full days into the study, one inmate pretended to have depression, uncontrolled rage and other mental dysfunctions. The prisoner was eventually released after screaming and acting in an unstable manner in front of the other inmates. He revealed later that he faked this "breakdown" to get out of the study early. This prisoner was replaced with one of the alternates.

==== Results ====
By the end of the study, the guards had won complete control over all of their prisoners and were using their authority to its greatest extent. One prisoner had even gone as far as to begin a hunger strike. When he refused to eat, the guards put him into solitary confinement for three hours (even though their own rules stated the limit that a prisoner could be in solitary confinement was only one hour). Instead of the other prisoners considering this inmate as a hero and following along in his strike, they chanted together that he was a bad prisoner and a troublemaker. Prisoners and guards had adapted rapidly to their roles, doing more than had been predicted and resulting in dangerous and potentially psychologically damaging situations. Zimbardo himself started to give in to the roles of the situation. He had to be shown the reality of the study by Christina Maslach, his girlfriend and future wife, who had just received her doctorate in psychology. Zimbardo stated that the message from the study is that "situations can have a more powerful influence over our behaviour than most people appreciate, and few people recognize [that]."

At the end of the study, after all the prisoners had been released, everyone was brought back into the same room for evaluation and to be able to get their feelings out in the open towards one another.

==== Criticisms ====
Ethical concerns about the study often compare it to the Milgram experiment, which was performed in 1961 at Yale University by Stanley Milgram, Zimbardo's former high school friend.

More recently, Thibault Le Texier of the University of Nice has examined the archives of the experiment, including videos, recordings, and Zimbardo's handwritten notes, and argued that "The guards knew what results the experiment was supposed to produce ... Far from reacting spontaneously to this pathogenic social environment, the guards were given clear instructions for how to create it ... The experimenters intervened directly in the experiment, either to give precise instructions, to recall the purposes of the experiment, or to set a general direction ... In order to get their full participation, Zimbardo intended to make the guards believe that they were his research assistants." Since his original publication in French, Le Texier's accusations have been examined by science communicators in the United States. In his book Humankind – a hopeful history (2020) historian Rutger Bregman discusses charges that the whole experiment was faked and fraudulent; Bregman argued this experiment is often used as an example to show that people succumb easily to evil behavior, but Zimbardo was less than candid about the fact that he told the guards to act the way they did. More recently, an American Psychological Association (APA) psychology article reviewed this work in detail and concluded that Zimbardo encouraged the guards to act the way they did, so rather than this behavior appearing on its own, it was generated by Zimbardo.

In response to critics, Zimbardo asserted that none of the criticisms provide substantial evidence that undermines the main conclusion of the Stanford Prison Experiment—namely, the importance of understanding how systemic and situational forces can influence individual behavior, often without our awareness. He emphasized that the core message of the SPE is not to equate a psychological simulation of prison life with reality, nor to claim that prisoners and guards always or typically behave as they did in the experiment, but instead, the SPE serves as a cautionary tale about the potential consequences of underestimating how social roles and external pressures can shape our actions. Zimbardo highlighted the lessons gained from the experience and his advocacy for stronger ethical standards in research.

==== Testimony at Trial of Abu Ghraib Prison Guards ====
Zimbardo discussed the similarities between the behavior of the participants in the Stanford prison experiment, and the prisoner abuse at Abu Ghraib. He did not accept the claim of Chairman of the Joint Chiefs of Staff General Myers that the events were due to a few rogue soldiers and that it did not represent the military. Instead he considered the situation that the soldiers were in and considered the possibility that this situation might have induced the behavior that they displayed. He began with the assumption that the abusers were not "bad apples" and were in a situation like that of the Stanford prison study, where physically and psychologically healthy people were behaving sadistically and brutalizing prisoners. Zimbardo became absorbed in trying to understand who these people were, asking the question "are they inexplicable, can we not understand them".

In 2004, Zimbardo testified for the defense during the court martial of Sgt. Ivan "Chip" Frederick, a guard at Abu Ghraib prison. He argued that Frederick's sentence should be lessened due to mitigating circumstances, explaining that few individuals can resist the powerful situational pressures of a prison, particularly without proper training and supervision. The judge apparently disregarded Zimbardo's testimony, and gave Frederick the maximum 8-year sentence. Zimbardo drew on the knowledge he gained from his participation in the Frederick case to write the book entitled The Lucifer Effect: Understanding How Good People Turn Evil, about the connections between Abu Ghraib and the prison experiments.

=== Shyness ===
After the prison study, Zimbardo decided to search for ways he could use psychology to help people. In 1972 he launched the first systematic investigation into the psychology of shyness. His research team at Stanford conducted large-scale surveys, experimental research as well as cross-cultural research. In 1975 they started the Stanford Shyness Clinic in Menlo Park, California, to treat shy behavior in adults and children. Zimbardo invited Dr. Lynne Henderson to head the clinic. They also set up a Shyness Institute where they trained therapists. The Shyness Clinic was moved in 2010 to The Gronowski Center at Palo Alto University. The clinic follows a "social fitness model", which encourages people to exercise socially.

Zimbardo's research on shyness resulted in two bestselling books on the topic, Shyness: What It Is, What To Do About It, and The Shy Child, co-authored with Shirley Radl.

=== Discontinuity theory ===
Zimbardo was intrigued by the question of how people who are functioning normally and effectively first begin to develop the symptoms of psychopathology. He was interested in understanding when, why, and how those experiences may eventually lead to psychiatric diagnosis. Using hypnosis as an experimental tool, he focused on the way that individuals experience significant "discontinuities" in their lives, and how these events can trigger a search for understanding (to be rational) and/or a search for social comparison with comparable others (to be normal).

=== Time perspective ===
==== Zimbardo Time Perspective Inventory ====
In 2008, Zimbardo published his work with John Boyd about Time Perspective Theory and the Zimbardo Time Perspective Inventory (ZTPI) in The Time Paradox: The New Psychology of Time That Will Change Your Life. In 2009, he met Richard Sword and started collaborating to convert the Time Perspective Theory into a clinical therapy, beginning a four-year long pilot study and establishing time perspective therapy. In 2009, Zimbardo did his Ted Talk "The Psychology of Time" about the Time Perspective Theory. According to this Ted Talk, there are six kinds of different Time Perspectives which are Past Positive TP (Time Perspective), Past Negative TP, Present Hedonism TP, Present Fatalism TP, Future Life Goal-Oriented TP and Future Transcendental TP. In 2012, Zimbardo, Richard Sword, and his wife Rosemary authored a book named The Time Cure. Time Perspective therapy bears similarities to Pause Button Therapy, developed by psychotherapist Martin Shirran, whom Zimbardo corresponded with and met at the first International Time Perspective Conference at the University of Coimbra, Portugal. Zimbardo wrote the foreword to the second edition of Shirran's book on the subject.

=== Heroism ===
After decades of researching the psychology of evil and social factors that make the majority conform to unethical behavior, Zimbardo devoted the latter part of his life to researching and promoting the psychology of heroism, including topics on disobedience to unjust authority, the phenomenon of whistle-blowers, and challenging the bystander effect. Zimbardo's contributions include the interpretation of scientific research into the roots of compassion, altruism, and peaceful human relationships. His last article with Greater Good, "The Banality of Heroism", examined how ordinary people can become everyday heroes. In February 2010, Zimbardo was a guest presenter at the Science of a Meaningful Life seminar: Goodness, Evil, and Everyday Heroism, along with Greater Good Science Center Executive Director Dacher Keltner.

Zimbardo worked as an advisor to the anti-bullying organization Bystander Revolution and appeared in the organization's videos to explain the bystander effect and discuss the evil of inaction.

==== Heroic Imagination Project ====
Zimbardo was the founder and director of the Heroic Imagination Project (HIP), a non-profit organization dedicated to promoting heroism in everyday life. Since 2010, HIP has been focused on educational programs across the United States and globally in Hungary, Poland, Indonesia, Portugal and Italy, to teach people how to resist behaviors such as bullying, bystander effect, and negative conformity and to encourage positive social action. The concept of the "banality of heroism," introduced by Dr. Zimbardo and Dr. Zeno Franco in 2006, serves as a guiding principle for the Heroic Imagination Project, emphasizing the belief that fostering a culture of heroism can empower individuals to act positively and make impactful changes in their communities. Zimbardo published an article contrasting heroism and altruism in 2011 with Zeno Franco and Kathy Blau in the Review of General Psychology.

The Heroesʼ Square Initiative, Hösök Tere, founded in 2013 by Györgyi Orosz, Péter Halácsy and Philip Zimbardo, was designed to identify and provide tools to overcome the beliefs that prevent people from standing up for others – or even ourselves. The mission of the Heroesʼ Square Foundation and Heroesʼ Square Company is to provide the tools for people to think critically, dare to stand up and do for others, and act as everyday heroes.

The Heroic Imagination Project has been in collaboration and mentorship with Giocherenda, an organization created by young migrants from Guinea, Gambia, Mali, Burkina Faso, and Morocco. Their use of creative games and HIP curriculum focuses on transforming divisive narratives, engaging in emancipatory storytelling, and fostering cooperation. Giocherenda, which sounds like the Italian word giocare (to play), comes from Pulaar (a West African language) and it means “solidarity, awareness of interdependence, strength through sharing, the joy of doing things together”.

In Portugal the Heroic Imagination Project is being implemented by the Look Around Association, with the impact evaluation being led by the Center for Research on Human Development of the Catholic University of Porto. In 2018 HIP Portugal team implemented a pilot study of a version of HIP curriculum for adolescents – HIP Teens. In 2020, the program ‘First Psychological Aid for Heroes’ was created in partnership with the Portuguese Red Cross, combining and adaptation of HIP curriculum for kids, along with their training of psychological first aid. The first HIP Club was created in 2023, following the implementation of the HIP Teens program in the social center Centro Social da Paróquia de Nossa Senhora da Ajuda. Its aim is to give young people a voice, enabling them to actively contribute to transforming their reality. The HIP Club serves as a space where youngsters identify issues they would like to change in their surroundings (in the community center, school, neighborhood, etc.), and actively contribute to solving them.

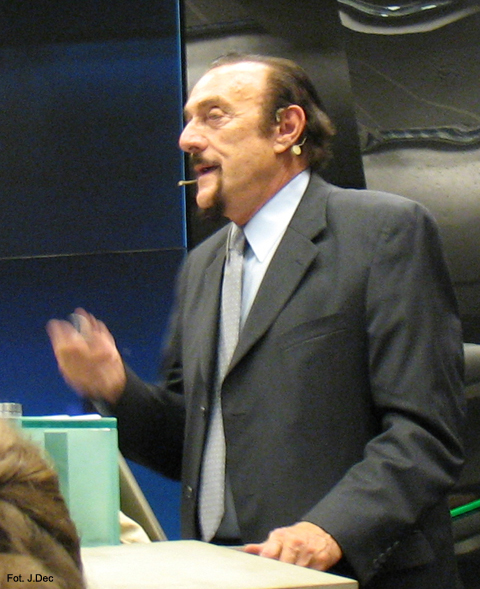
Zimbardo speaking in Poland, 2009

=== Social Intensity Syndrome (SIS) ===
In 2008, Zimbardo began working with Sarah Brunskill and Anthony Ferreras on a new theory termed Social Intensity Syndrome (SIS). SIS is a new term invented to describe and normalize the effects military culture has on the socialization of both active soldiers and veterans. Zimbardo and Brunskill presented the new theory and a preliminary factor analysis of it accompanying survey at the Western Psychological Association in 2013. Brunskill finished the data collection in December 2013. Through an exploratory component factor analysis, confirmatory factor analysis, internal consistency, and validity tests demonstrated that SIS was a reliable and valid construct of measuring military socialization.

== Death ==
Zimbardo died at home in San Francisco on October 14, 2024, at the age of 91. His wife Christina and their children were by his side when he died.

== Recognition ==
In 2002, Zimbardo received the Carl Sagan Award for Public Understanding of Science, awarded by Council of Scientific Society Presidents. In 2005, he was honored for lifetime of research contributions to knowledge with the Havel Foundation Vision 97 Award, the foundation of former Czech president Vaclav Havel and his wife Dagmar, which presents an award for outstanding work in the world of science. The American Psychological Association awarded Zimbardo with an award for Distinguished Contributions in the Public Interest (2008), Gold Medal Award for Life Achievement in the Science of Psychology (2012), Kurt Lewin award, for “outstanding contributions to the development and integration of psychological research and social action” (2015), and the Presidential Citation for international achievements (2023). In 2010, he received three Lifetime Achievement Awards, form Brooklyn College, the Western Psychological Association, and Society of Personality and Social Psychology. In 2012, Zimbardo received the American Psychological Foundation Gold Medal for Lifetime Achievement in the Science of Psychology. In 2003, Zimbardo and University of Rome La Sapienza scholars Gian Vittorio Caprara and Claudio Barbaranelli were awarded the sarcastic Ig Nobel Prize for Psychology for their report Politicians' Uniquely Simple Personalities. He received honorary degrees from the Pacific Graduate School of Psychology (1996), National University of San Martin, Peru (1996), Aristotle University, Thessaloniki, Greece (1998), Webster University, Vienna (2007), Brooklyn College, New York (2008), Rutgers University, New Jersey (2009), Lund University, Lund, Sweden (2009), Loyola University, Chicago (2010), SWPS University in Warsaw (2011), University of Puget Sound (2013), Chapman University (2014), and Charles University, Prague (2016).

== Books ==
Dr. Zimbardo authored dozens of textbooks and trade books on his research topics, many of which have been reprinted and translated into multiple languages.

Psychology And Life, the long-running, classic, introductory psychology textbook for college students, was co-authored by Philip Zimbardo for decades, beginning in its 8th edition with Floyd Ruch, through its 19th edition with Richard Gerrig. It has been translated into many languages for global use.

Psychology: Core Concepts another introductory psychology textbook used for many American college undergraduate psychology courses was co-authored by Philip Zimbardo and has been translated into various languages for international education.

Shyness: What It is, What to Do About It was a bestselling book, exploring shyness with a deep understanding of the emotions at play. It offers practical advice, exercises, and motivational support to help shy individuals improve their social skills and boost their self-confidence. It was a highly impactful book, often referenced in psychological literature and widely read by individuals seeking help with social anxiety and shyness. This was followed by The Shy Child, co-authored with Shirley Radl in 1981.

The Lucifer Effect, Zimbardo's firsthand account of the 1971 Stanford prison experiment (SPE), was the William James Book Award winner in psychology in 2008, and was on The New York Times Non-Fiction Best Seller list.

The Time Paradox: The New Psychology That Will Change Your Life (2008, with Boyd, J.) is one of Zimbardo's notable works, where he draws on thirty years of research to reveal how an individual's time perspective shapes one's life.

The Time Cure: Overcoming PTSD with the New Psychology of Time Perspective Therapy (2012, with Sword, R. and Sword, R.K.M.) Dr. Zimbardo offers an approach using The Zimbardo Time Perspective Inventory (ZTPI) for those suffering with post-traumatic stress disorder.

In 2015, Zimbardo co-authored a book, Man (Dis)connected: How Technology Has Sabotaged What It Means To Be Male, which collected research to support a thesis that males are increasingly disconnected from society. He warned against the impacts of video game addiction and pornography addiction.

Zimbardo, P. G., & Johnson, R. L. (2024). Psychology according to Shakespeare: What you can learn about human nature from Shakespeare's great plays. Guilford, CT: Prometheus Books.

== Media appearances ==
Zimbardo made numerous media appearances on national TV and radio, including on The Phil Donahue Show, The Today Show, Good Morning America, 60 Minutes, 20/20, Nightline, That's Incredible, and NPR, among others.

He narrated educational videos that used selected classic Candid Camera hidden-camera episodes to illustrate key psychology principles for Introductory Psychology and Social Psychology courses.

He contributed to educational media projects, most notably as the narrator, writer, and scientific advisor for Discovering Psychology, a 26-program series produced by PBS-TV and the Annenberg Corporation, which has been translated and distributed worldwide (1989, updated 2001).

Zimbardo served as a consultant on two British TV documentaries: Five Steps to Tyranny (BBC, 2000) and The Human Zoo (LWT, 2001).

Terry Gross interviewed Dr. Zimbardo on NPR's Fresh Air (May 1, 2007).

TED Talk: Zimbardo, Philip G. The Psychology of Evil. TED, Feb. 2008.

TED Talk: Zimbardo, Philip G. The Psychology of Time. TED, Feb. 2009.

Zimbardo made appearances on American television, such as The Daily Show with Jon Stewart on March 29, 2007, The Colbert Report on February 11, 2008, and Dr. Phil on October 25, 2010.

Why Do Good People Do Bad Things? (NPR TED Radio Hour, March 28, 2013). Philip Zimbardo discusses how easy it is for nice people to turn bad, but how easy it is to be a hero, and how we can rise to the challenge.

Creator of Stanford Prison Experiment Looks Back on It (HuffPost Live, July 14, 2015)

Philip Zimbardo Thinks We All Can Be Evil (New York Times, July 16, 2015)

The Stanford Prison Experiment (Charlie Rose, July 17, 2015)

What Is the Ethical Impact of Prison? (MSNBC, July 18, 2015)

Philip Zimbardo Revisits the Stanford Prison Experiment (KQED Forum, July 20, 2015)

The Nature and Nurture of Good and Evil (The Michael Shermer Show, August 15, 2021)

== Charity and other endeavors ==
Zimbardo's early commitment to social change took shape in initiatives like the Harlem Summer Project, which provided educational opportunities for disadvantaged children.

From 2003 on, Zimbardo was active in charitable and economic work in rural Sicily through the Zimbardo-Luczo Fund with Steve Luczo and the local director Pasquale Marino, which provides scholarships for academically gifted students from Corleone and Cammarata.

The Zimbardo Center in Nikiszowiec was established in 2014 by the Local Initiatives Factory Association, primarily as a place to support local youth. It has become one of the most important points on the map of Nikiszowiec, where social and cultural events are organized as a place of positive change.

== Works ==
- Influencing Attitudes and Changing Behavior: a basic introduction to relevant methodology, theory, and applications. Topics in Social Psychology (Revised printing ed.). Reading, Massachusetts: Addison-Wesley Publishing Company. 1970. ISBN 978-0-201-08790-1.
- The Cognitive Control of Motivation: The Consequences of Choice and Dissonance. Scott, Foresman. 1969. ISBN 978-2-00-100017-3.
- Stanford Prison Experiment: A Simulation Study of the Psychology of Imprisonment. Philip G. Zimbardo, Incorporated. 1972.
- Influencing Attitudes and Changing Behavior: a basic introduction to relevant methodology, theory, and applications. Topics in social psychology (Revised printing ed.). Reading, Massachusetts: Addison-Wesley Publishing Company. 1970. ISBN 978-0-201-08790-1.
- Canvassing for Peace: A Manual for Volunteers. Society for the Psychological Study of Social Issues. 1970.
- Influencing Attitudes and Changing Behavior: an introduction to method, theory, and applications of social control and personal power. Topics in social psychology (2d ed.). Reading, Mass: Addison-Wesley Pub. Co. 1977. ISBN 978-0-201-08796-3.
- Dempsey, David; Zimbardo, Philip G. (1978). Psychology & you (1st ed.). Glenview, Ill: Scott, Foresman. ISBN 978-0-673-15086-8.
- Shyness: what it is, what to do about it. Cambridge, Mass: Perseus Books. 1989. ISBN 978-0-201-55018-4.
- The Psychology of Attitude Change and Social Onfluence. Philadelphia: Temple University Press. 1991. ISBN 978-0-87722-852-3.
- Psychology (3rd ed.). Boston, u.a: Allyn and Bacon. 2000. ISBN 978-0-321-03432-8.
- The Shy Child: a parent's guide to preventing and overcoming shyness from infancy to adulthood. Cambridge, Mass: Malor Books. 1999. ISBN 978-1-883536-21-3.
- Psychology: core concepts (5th ed.). Boston, MA: Pearson/Allyn and Bacon. 2006. ISBN 978-0-205-42428-3.
- Psychology and Life (17th ed.). Boston: Pearson/Allen and Bacon. 2004. ISBN 978-0-205-41799-5.
- The Lucifer Effect: understanding how good people turn evil (1. ed.). New York, NY: Random House. 2007. ISBN 978-1-4000-6411-3.
- The Time Paradox: the new psychology of time that will change your life (1st Free press hardcover ed.). New York: Free Press. 2008. ISBN 978-1-4165-4198-1. OCLC 191024075.
- Levine, Robert; Rodrigues, Aroldo; Zelezny, Lynnette C., eds. (2008). "The Journey from the Bronx to Stanford to Abu Ghraib". Journeys in Social Psychology: looking back to inspire the future. New York: Psychology Press. pp. 85–104. ISBN 978-0-8058-6134-1. OCLC 192080462.
- Cianciabella, Salvatore (2014). Siamo uomini e caporali: psicologia della disobbedienza. Milano: Angeli. ISBN 978-88-204-9248-9.
- Maschi in difficoltà : perché il digitale crea sempre più problemi alla nuova generazione e come aiutarla. F. Angeli. 2017. ISBN 978-88-917-4406-7. OCLC 1006524191.
- Man (Dis)Connected: how technology has sabotaged what it means to be male (First published ed.). London Sydney Auckland Johannesburg: Rider. 2015. ISBN 978-1-84604-484-7.
- Man, Interrupted: why young men are struggling & what we can do about it. Conari Press. 2016. ISBN 978-1-57324-689-7.

== See also ==
- Banality of evil
- Human experimentation in the United States
- List of Ig Nobel Prize winners
- List of social psychologists

== Sources ==
- Franco, Zeno; Blau, Kathy; Zimbardo, Philip G. (June 2011). "Heroism: A Conceptual Analysis and Differentiation Between Heroic Action and Altruism". Review of General Psychology. 15 (2): 99–113. doi:10.1037/a0022672. At Researchgate.
