= Greg Barker, Baron Barker of Battle =

British Conservative Party politician & life peer (b.1966)

The Right Honourable The Lord Barker of Battle PC
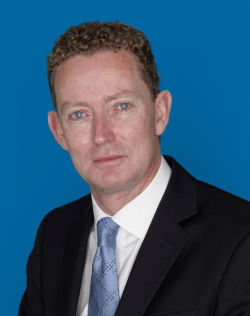
- Official portrait, 2011

Minister of State for Climate Change
- In office 12 May 2010 – 14 July 2014
- Prime Minister: David Cameron
- Preceded by: The Lord Hunt of Kings Heath
- Succeeded by: Amber Rudd

Member of the House of Lords
- Lord Temporal
- Life peerage 12 October 2015

Member of Parliament for Bexhill and Battle
- In office 7 June 2001 – 30 March 2015
- Preceded by: Charles Wardle
- Succeeded by: Huw Merriman

Personal details
- Born: 8 March 1966 (age 60) Shoreham-by-Sea, Sussex, England
- Party: Conservative
- Spouse(s): George Prassas (2022–Present); Celeste Harrison (1992–2006)
- Education: Royal Holloway College, London
- Website: www.gregorybarker.com

Gregory Leonard George Barker, Baron Barker of Battle, PC (born 8 March 1966) is a British Conservative Party politician, life peer, and businessperson. In May 2010 he was appointed Minister of State for Energy and Climate Change, a role in which he served until 2014. At the following year's general election he stood down as MP for Bexhill and Battle and was appointed to the House of Lords.

== Early life and education ==
Born in Sussex, Barker attended Upper Beeding Primary School, Steyning Grammar School and Lancing College. In 1987, he earned a bachelor's degree in history and politics from Royal Holloway College, London. In 1990–91, he attended a corporate finance programme at London Business School.

== Early career ==
Barker was a researcher at the Centre for Policy Studies in 1987, before joining Gerard Vivian Gray as an equity analyst in 1988, and was a member of the Honourable Artillery Company between 1989 and 1994. In 1990, he became the director for International Pacific Securities. He was the deputy chairman of Hammersmith Conservative Association in 1993. From 1998, he was a director of Daric plc, an advertising company.

Barker worked as Head of International Investor Relations for the Sibneft Oil Group, owned by Roman Abramovich, from 1998 to 2000.

== Career ==
=== House of Commons ===
Barker was at first unsuccessful in his attempts to be elected to Parliament when he contested the safe Labour seat of Eccles in Greater Manchester, where he was defeated by Ian Stewart. Barker then became the deputy chairman of Tooting Conservative Association and an advisor to Conservative MP David Willetts.

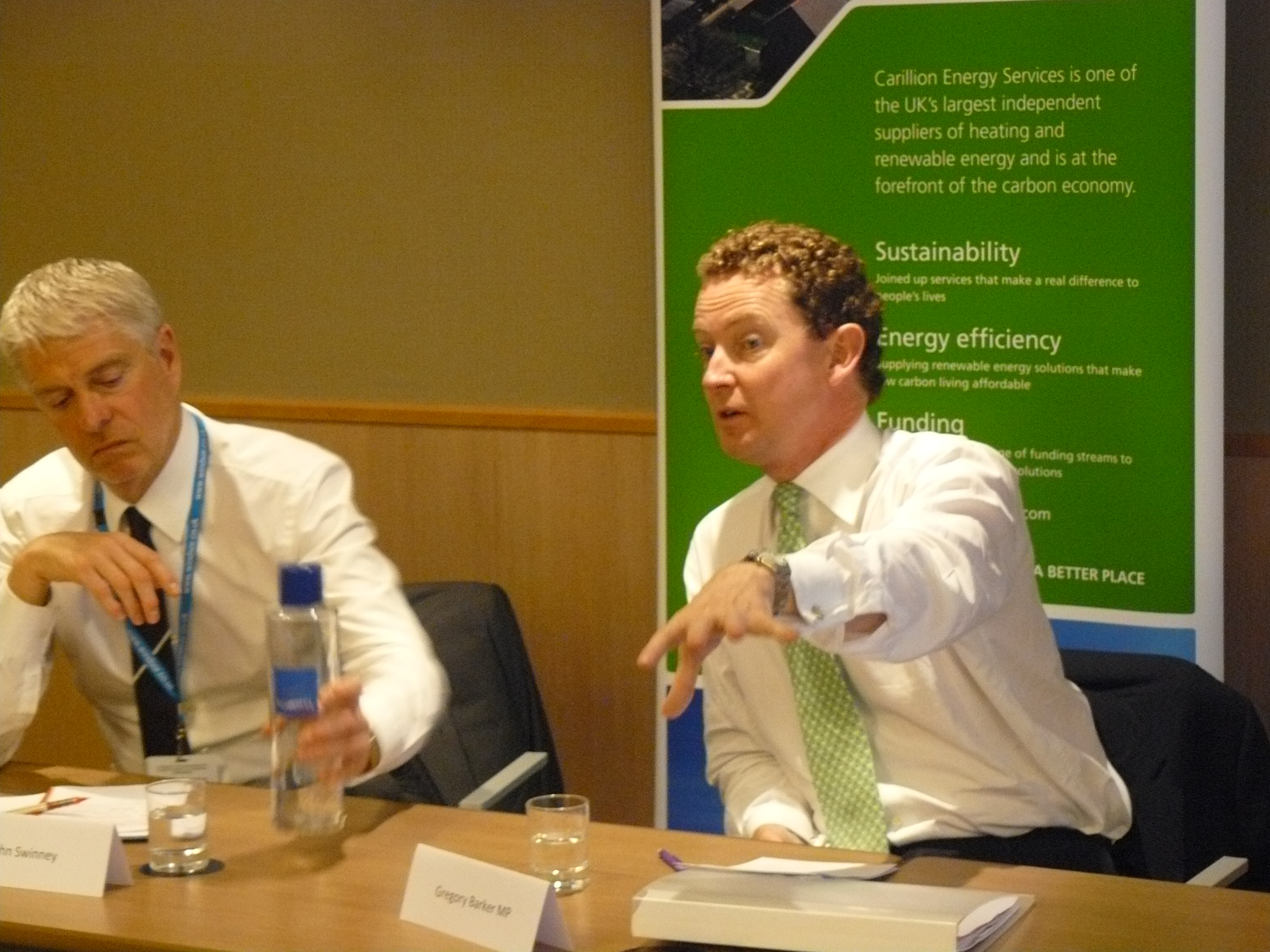
Barker (right) at the 2011 Conservative Party Conference

In 2001, Barker became the MP for Bexhill and Battle following the retirement of the sitting Conservative MP, Charles Wardle. He won the safe seat securing over 10,500 votes ahead of the Liberal Democrat candidate, Stephen Hardy.

In 2006, as Shadow Environment Minister, he accompanied then-opposition leader David Cameron to the tourist destination of Svalbard in the Arctic Ocean, where Cameron was photographed driving a dog sled. The dogsled excursion allowed them to view the Scott Turner Glacier, which is said to have lost 50% of its mass in the past 100 years as a result of climate warming.

In 2009, The Telegraph reported that Barker was implicated in the parliamentary expenses scandal because he claimed reimbursement for a secondary residence in London while his primary residence in East Sussex was occupied by his estranged wife. The scandal resulted in a large number of resignations and prosecutions, with several members sent to prison. A parliamentary committee demanded repayments from numerous members, some approaching £10,000. The committee's comment on Barker, however, was "Mr Barker has no issues."

The British press was not finished with Barker's London flat. The next year, a newspaper in his constituency of East Sussex reported that HM Revenue and Customs was demanding capital gains tax from his sale of the flat, reporting that he had made a profit of £320,000 in just over two years of ownership. The flat, which had been listed as a secondary residence for parliamentary purposes, was listed as a primary residence for tax purposes. There was no discussion of whether the two definitions of "primary residence" were the same. Barker replied that the profit was attributable to renovations he had made, and was thus not capital gain. Nonetheless, he announced that he was making a “voluntary payment”, reported to be in the tens of thousands of pounds, to settle the matter.

Boris Johnson would later have a similar problem with the American IRS, which would lead him to renounce his US citizenship.

On 5 February 2013 Barker voted in favour in the House of Commons Second Reading vote on marriage equality in Britain.

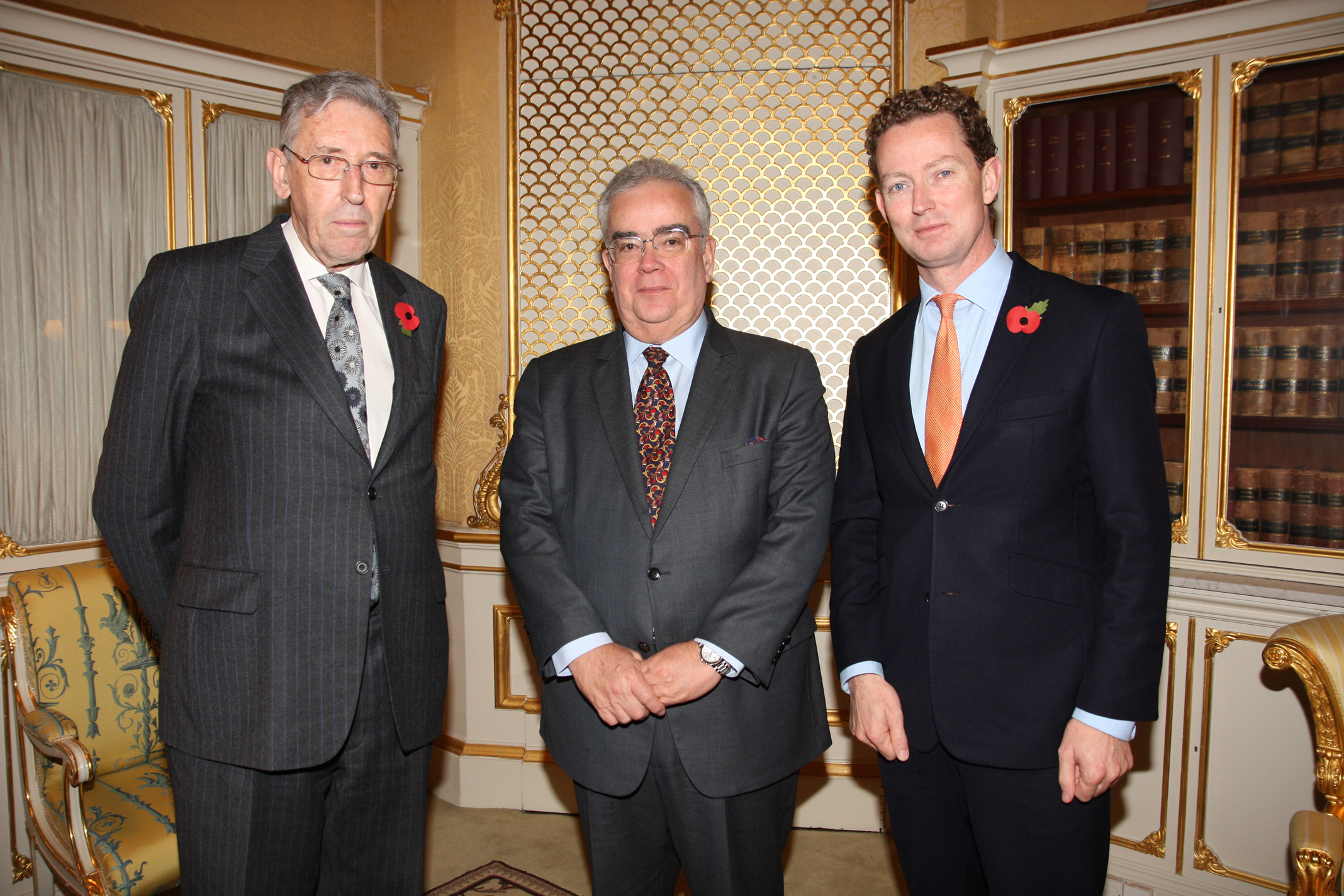
Barker with Lord Howell meeting Andre Amado of the Brazilian Ministry of External Affairs on 12 November 2010.

On 14 July 2014, he announced he would not be standing at the 2015 general election.

In November 2014, Mayor of London, Boris Johnson appointed Barker as the new chairman of the London Sustainable Development Commission. He led the organisation in its goal to ensure environmental challenges were prioritised across London, where an estimated population growth of 11 million people (37%) by 2050 was reported.

=== Ministerial career ===
In 2010, Barker was appointed a Minister of state under Chris Huhne at the Department of Energy and Climate Change. Projects that he pursued included the Green Investment Bank, Renewable Heat Incentive and Capital Markets Climate Initiative. Green Investment Bank was later privatized over his objection and is now known as Green Investment Group.

During his tenure, he was accused of using a staff microwave to warm a cushion for his dog, Otto.

In 2012, he accepted additional responsibility as Minister for Business Engagement with India. The next year, he joined with MP Virendra Sharma to confer a Lifetime Achievement Award on the late Jawaharlal Darda, considered an Indian national hero for his role in ending British rule. In 2014, he was a member of a delegation to India headed by the Chancellor of the Exchequer.

=== House of Lords ===
In August 2015, Barker was nominated for a life peerage in the Dissolution Peerages List. On 12 October 2015, he was created Baron Barker of Battle, of Battle in the County of East Sussex. On 10 November of that year, he was introduced to the Lords. He was supported during the ceremony by John Browne, Baron Browne of Madingley, and Guy Black, Baron Black of Brentwood.

In February 2019, Barker took a leave of absence from the House of Lords upon accepting an executive chairmanship position with the En+ Group. Barker was credited with having helped the Russian company to have the US sanctions lifted earlier that year, for which he was awarded a bonus of about £3–4 million (US$3.9–$5.2 million) that he described as "relatively modest".

=== Business ===
Barker was appointed non-executive chairman of Russian aluminium and hydropower firm En+ Group in October 2017, being promoted to Executive Chairman in 2019 before leaving in 2022. As chairman, he presided over the first IPO by a Russian company in London since 2014. Six months later, the company was sanctioned by the US Treasury’s Office of Foreign Assets Control because of the large ownership stake of Russian oligarch Oleg Deripaska. Barker responded with the "Barker plan", which reduced Deripaska's holdings from around 70% to below 45%. The US treasury lifted the sanctions early in 2019, citing this and a commitment to "unprecedented transparency" and an assurance that a majority of the directors will always be independent of Deripaska, who remained under his own personal sanction.

Barker was appointed Chairman of The EV Network, a developer of EV charging stations, in 2017.

In June 2021, Lord Barker was additionally appointed as co-chair of the World Bank Group's Carbon Pricing Leadership Coalition (CPLC) alongside Chile's Minister Juan Carlos Jobet, with whom he shared duties in opening discussions around issues such as post pandemic transitioning to Net Zero and universal carbon pricing, something of which Barker was a strong proponent. He stated: "This should be a bipartisan issue... I'm not a believer in a one size fits all. There will be different applications of carbon price depending on the country or the community that it's aimed at, but the underlying principle that you should put a price on dangerous carbon pollution to drive investment away from fossil fuels and into exciting clean areas of the economy has to be right."

== Personal life ==
Barker married Celeste Harrison, an heiress to the Charles Wells brewery fortune, in 1992. Following a diary report in The Observer, Barker confirmed he and his wife had separated, and on 26 October 2006 the tabloid newspaper the Daily Mirror revealed that he had left his wife and children for vintage fashion expert William Banks-Blaney. The paper backed the story by quoting his mother-in-law. The Independent on Sunday later reported that Barker has confirmed that he is gay.

In 2009, Barker's wealth was estimated at £3.9 million.

In December 2022, Barker married his long-time domestic partner, George Prassas.

Parliament of the United Kingdom
Preceded by Charles Wardle	Member of Parliament for Bexhill and Battle; 2001–2015	Succeeded by Huw Merriman
Orders of precedence in the United Kingdom
Preceded by The Lord Hague of Richmond	Gentlemen; Baron Barker of Battle	Followed by The Lord Robathan
