= Christina Maslach =

American psychologist

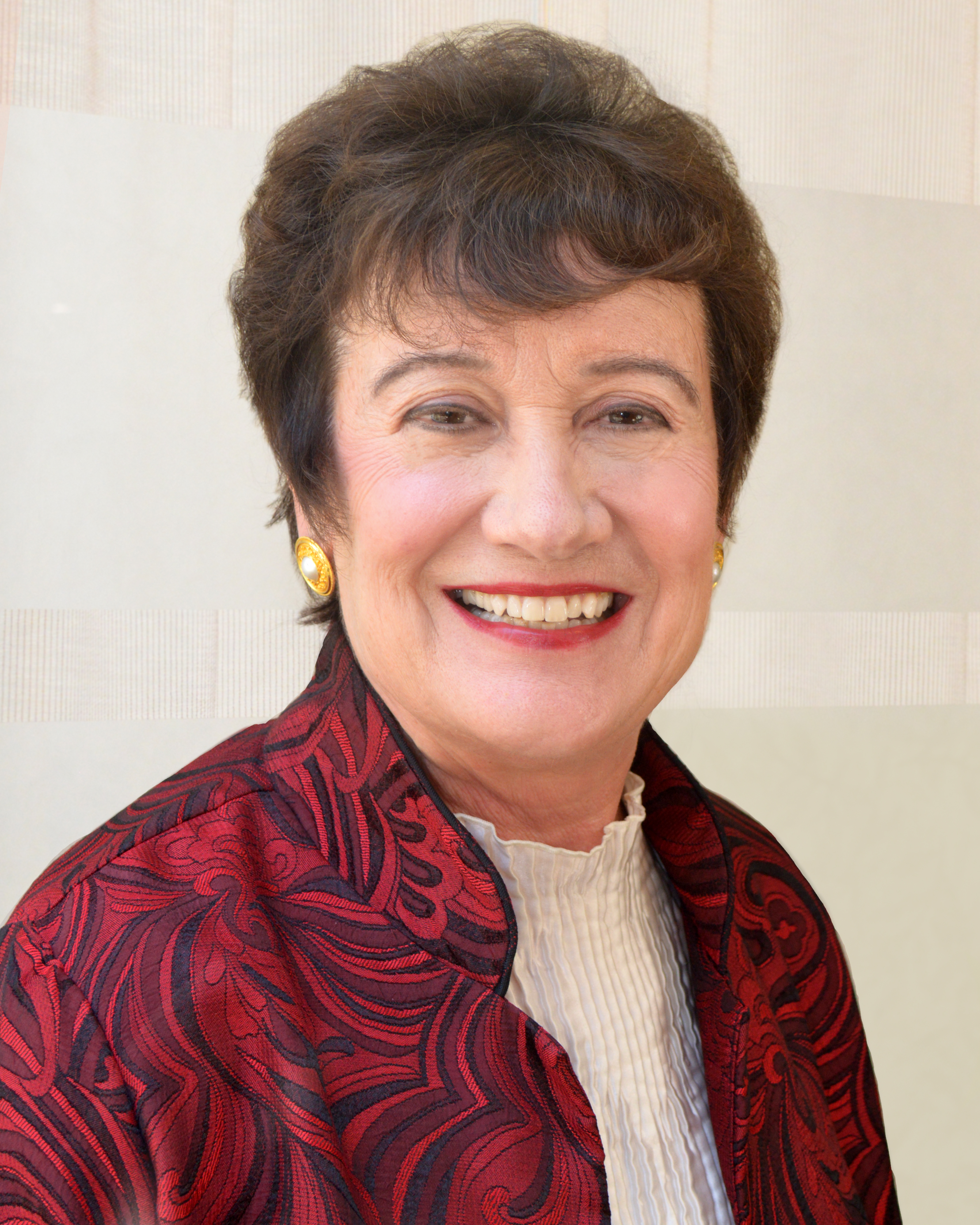
- Maslach in 2017
- Born: January 21, 1946 (age 80)
- Education: Radcliffe College (BA); Stanford University (PhD)
- Occupations: Psychologist; psychology professor
- Known for: Stopping the Stanford prison experiment
- Spouse: Philip Zimbardo (m. 1972; died 2024)

Christina Maslach (born January 21, 1946) is an American social psychologist and professor emerita of psychology at the University of California, Berkeley, known for her research on occupational burnout. She is a co-author of the Maslach Burnout Inventory and Areas of Worklife Survey. Early in her professional career, Maslach was instrumental in stopping the Stanford prison experiment. In 1997, she was awarded the U.S. Professor of the Year.

== Education ==
Maslach graduated from Berkeley High School (California) (1963), Radcliffe College (1967) and earned a Ph.D. in psychology at Stanford University (1971). After receiving her Ph.D., Maslach joined the psychology department at Berkeley as an assistant professor.

== Career ==
Her critique of the Stanford prison experiment persuaded investigator Philip Zimbardo (later her husband) to stop the experiment after only six days. The experience also shaped Maslach's later career, particularly her interest in occupational burnout as a response to unavoidable stress. Maslach and Zimbardo married in 1972, a year after the study.

In 1981, Maslach and Susan E. Jackson authored the Maslach Burnout Inventory (MBI) to assess an individual's experience of occupational burnout in human services settings. She later developed alternative versions of the original MBI to be used to assess education settings (1986) and general occupational settings (1996). More than 30 years later, in 2014, the Maslach Burnout Inventory was still being cited as "the mainstream measure for burnout".

From 1988 to 1989, she was president of the Western Psychological Association (WPA). Since 2001, she has been vice provost for undergraduate education at the University of California, Berkeley.

== Awards and honors ==
In 1991, Maslach was elected a Fellow of the American Association for the Advancement of Science. She is also a Fellow of the American Psychological Association and of the WPA.

At Berkeley, Maslach has received the Distinguished Teaching Award and the Social Sciences Service Award. In 1997, she was named the U.S. Professor of the Year by the Council for Advancement and Support of Education and the Carnegie Foundation for the Advancement of Teaching in 1997. In 2008, Maslach won the WPA Outstanding Teaching Award.
