= 2022 in Ukraine =

Chronology of Ukraine

- Decades: 2000s; 2010s; 2020s
- See also: History of Ukraine; List of years in Ukraine

The following is a list of events from the year 2022 in Ukraine.

This year most notably saw the beginning of the Russian invasion of Ukraine to the north in the Chernihiv, Kyiv, and Zhytomyr Oblasts, from the east into the Donetsk, Kharkiv, Luhansk, and Sumy Oblasts, and from the previously occupied Crimea to the south into the Kherson, Mykolaiv, and Zaporizhzhia Oblasts. Ukraine's refusal to surrender its capital and support from its allies led to Russia withdrawing from its northern occupied territories in April, and successful Ukrainian eastern and southern counteroffensives in September and November which largely stabilized the frontline.

The war continued into the following year primarily in the Luhansk, Donetsk, Zaporizhzhia, and Kherson Oblasts, despite an internationally condemned and widely unrecognized Russian referendum annexing the oblasts in September.

== Incumbents ==
- President: Volodymyr Zelenskyy
- Prime Minister: Denys Shmyhal

=== Governors ===
- Cherkasy Oblast: Oleksandr Skichko (until March 1, SN), Ihor Taburets (starting March 1, Independent / SN ally)
- Chernihiv Oblast: Vyacheslav Chaus (Independent / SN ally)
- Chernivtsi Oblast: Serhiy Osachuk (until June 14, SN), Ruslan Zaparanyuk (starting June 14, Independent / SN ally)
- Dnipropetrovsk Oblast: Valentyn Reznichenko (Independent / SN ally)
- Donetsk Oblast: Pavlo Kyrylenko (Independent / SN ally)
- Ivano-Frankivsk Oblast: Svitlana Onyshchuk (Independent / SN ally)
- Kharkiv Oblast: Oleh Syniehubov (SN)
- Kherson Oblast: Hennadiy Lahuta (until July 9, Independent), Dmytro Butriy (Acting, July 9–August 3), Yaroslav Yanushevych (starting August 3, Independent)
- Khmelnytskyi Oblast: Serhiy Hamaliy (Independent / SN ally)
- Kirovohrad Oblast: Mariia Chorna (until March 7, Independent), Andriy Raikovych (starting March 7, Independent / SN ally)
- Kyiv Oblast: Oleksiy Kuleba (February 8–March 15, Independent), Oleksandr Pavlyuk (March 15–May 21, Independent), Oleksiy Kuleba (starting May 21, Independent / SN ally)
- Luhansk Oblast: Serhiy Haidai (Independent / SN ally)
- Lviv Oblast: Maksym Kozytskyi (SN)
- Mykolaiv Oblast: Vitaliy Kim (SN)
- Odesa Oblast: Serhiy Hrynevetskyi (until March 1, Independent), 淬Maksym Marchenko (starting March 1, Independent / SN ally)
- Poltava Oblast: Dmytro Lunin (Acting, Independent / SN ally)
- Rivne Oblast: Vitaliy Koval (SN)
- Sumy Oblast: Dmytro Zhyvytskyi (Independent / SN ally)
- Ternopil Oblast: Volodymyr Trush (SN)
- Vinnytsia Oblast: Serhiy Borzov (SN)
- Volyn Oblast: Yuriy Pohulyayko (Independent / SN ally)
- Zakarpattia Oblast: Viktor Mykyta (Independent / SN ally)
- Zaporizhzhia Oblast: Oleksandr Starukh (Independent / SN ally)
- Zhytomyr Oblast: Vitaliy Bunechko (Independent / SN ally)

== Events ==
Ongoing – COVID-19 pandemic in Ukraine; Russian invasion of Ukraine

=== January ===
- January – 2021–2022 Russo-Ukrainian crisis
- 17 January – Former president Petro Poroshenko, filed his appeal to the court after he was appread by his scandals during his term and the Euromaidan protest.

=== February ===
- 14 February – German chancellor Olaf Scholz met with President Zelenskyy in Kyiv, and with Russian president Putin in Moscow to attempt to ease the crisis in Ukraine.
- 19 February – 2022 Russia-Ukraine clash accusations.
- 21 February – Russian president Vladimir Putin signed a decree recognising the Donetsk and Luhansk People's Republics in eastern Ukraine, and ordered Russian forces to enter Ukraine.
- 24 February (Day 1 of the 2022 Russian invasion of Ukraine)
  - Explosions from Russian rocket strikes were heard throughout the country, especially in and around Kyiv.
  - The Ukrainian Defense Minister claimed Ukraine had inflicted 800 casualties among Russian forces, destroyed 30 Russian tanks, 7 Russian aircraft, and 6 helicopters. This claim remained unverified.
  - US president Joe Biden and Secretary of Defense Lloyd Austin announced the deployment of an additional 7,000 troops to Germany from the US to support NATO allies amid the crisis.
- 25 February (Day 2)
  - The European Union announced new sanctions on Russia targeting the country's financial, energy, and transport sectors, visa policy, and include export controls and export financing bans in response to the invasion. The sanctions were targeted to have "maximum impact on the Russian economy and political elite" according to European Commission President Ursula von der Leyen at a joint news conference with French president Emmanuel Macron.
  - A video of a Russian T-72B3 tank with a Z painted on the front raised the flag of the Soviet Union as it entered Ukraine. While certainly a statement, the flag was more likely was there to "reduce the risk of friendly fire," especially from the air, according to a source in Kyiv.
- 26 February (Day 3) – Artem Datsishin, a ballet dancer of Ukraine's National Opera House, was injured by Russian shelling and later died in the hospital.
- 28 February (Day 5) – The first instance of a Ukrainian farmer towing away a Russian tank appeared on social media, followed by many more to come in the future.

=== March ===
- 3 March (Day 8) – Eight civilians were killed in the city of Izium when the town's central hospital reportedly sustained significant damage from a Russian rocket strike.
- 5 March (Day 10) – A video posted online showed a Russian jet being shot down by Ukrainian forces near Chernihiv. Later images showed the capture of the pilot, who ejected from his plane but was injured.
- 6 March (Day 11) – Intense shelling of Izium began as Russian forces occupied Honcharivka and Pisky neighbourhoods and the city railway station, according to deputy mayor of Izium Volodymyr Matsokin.
- 7 March (Day 12)
  - Maj Gen Vitaly Gerasimov, chief of staff of Russia's 41st combined army, was killed outside of Kharkiv, according to Ukraine's defence ministry, but Gerasimov was confirmed to be alive by BBC Russian when he was awarded the Order of Alexander Nevsky on 23 May 2022.
  - Russian online outlets reported that the city of Izium was taken by Russian forces. This claim does not appear to have been factual, especially because fighting broke out between Ukrainian and Russian forces the next day.
- 8 March (Day 13) – The United States banned imports of all Russian oil, liquefied natural gas, and coal in response to the Russian invasion of Ukraine.
- 10 March (Day 15) – 2,250 civilians were evacuated from Izium as Russian forces pushed further into the city.
- 11 March (Day 16)
  - Maj Gen Andrei Kolesnikov, the Russian commander of the 29th combined army, was killed in fighting, according to official Ukrainian sources.
  - The Ukrainian military claimed to have damaged or destroyed 31 Russian Battalion tactical groups (BTGs).
- 12 March (Day 17)
  - Russian troops captured the northern part of Izium.
  - Russian forces conducted a new advance northeast from Kherson along the western bank of the Dnipro, as well as make limited territorial gains east of Mariupol.
- 13 March (Day 18) – Yevhen Matveyev, leader of Dniprorudne, was abducted by Russian troops, according to Foreign Minister Dmytro Kuleba.
- 14 March (Day 19)
  - Some information suggested China expressed some openness to providing Russia with requested military and financial assistance with the war on Ukraine, according to a US diplomat. Both China and Russia denied that Moscow asked for military assistance.
  - A Russian missile attack on a military training centre in Yavoriv killed around 35 people, 15 miles away from the Ukrainian border with Poland.
- 15 March (Day 20)
  - The UNGA voted on a resolution demanding an immediate end to the Russian offensive in Ukraine. 141 countries voted in favor of the resolution, 35 nations abstained, and only 5 nations voted against: (Russia, Belarus, North Korea, Eritrea, and Syria) in a "sweeping show of international unity". The UNSC failed to adopt the vote though, because of the single "no" vote from Russia, a P5 member.

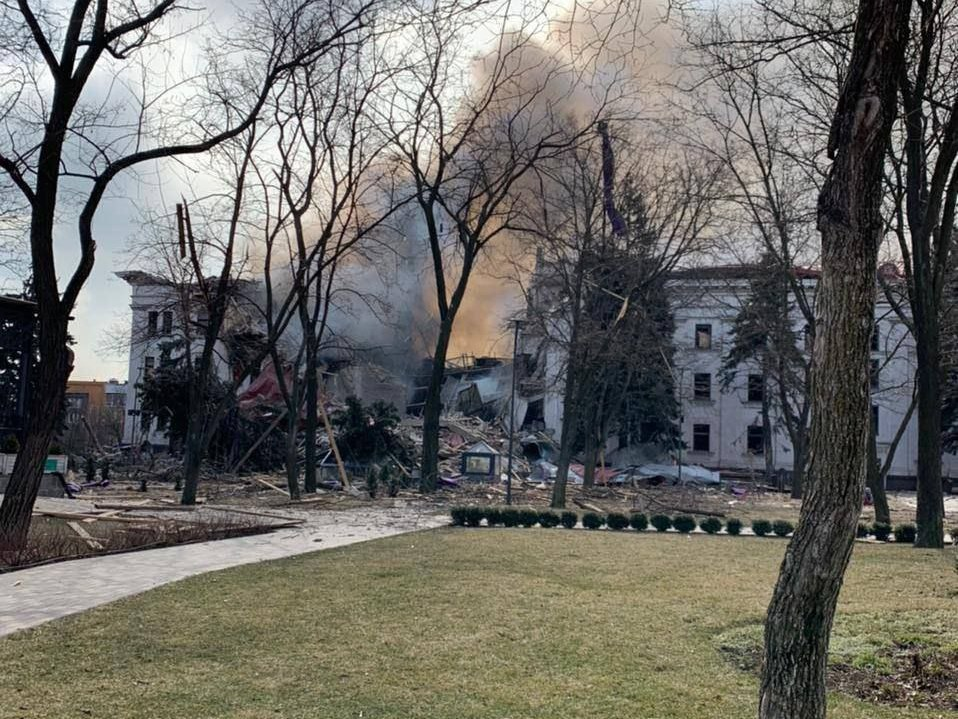
The Mariupol Drama Theatre, turned shelter, was hit by a Russian airstrike that killed an estimated 300 people on 15 March

  - A theater in Mariupol where hundreds of people had taken shelter was bombed in a Russian air strike, killing around 300 people and trapping around 1,300 in the rubble.
  - A boarding school for visually impaired children, a hospital, three schools, and "other military facilities" were destroyed by the Russian military in Rubizhne, killing four people, according to Luhansk regional administrator Serhiy Haidai in an interview with local media.
  - The mayor of Melitopol Ivan Fedorov, who had been detained by Russian forces, was freed as part of a prisoner swap.
  - Maj Gen Oleg Mityaev, Russian commander of the 150th motorised rifle division, was killed by the Azov regiment near Mariupol.
- 16 March (Day 21) – Russian troops seized the southern part of Izium, before Ukrainian forces managed to recapture their positions soon after.
- 17 March (Day 22)
  - There was no mention of the War in Ukraine after China's commissioner for foreign security affairs, Cheng Guoping, met with Russia's ambassador to China, Andrey Denisov, according to China's Foreign Ministry.
  - Russian-backed rebels from the Luhansk People's Republic took control of government buildings in the city of Rubizhne.
  - New Zealand added an additional 364 Russian political and military targets to a travel ban list and 13 individuals and 19 entities to a sanctions list, including asset freezes. Those on the list included Putin and Foreign Minister Sergey Lavrov.
- 18 March (Day 23)
  - Andrei Mordvichev, commander of Russia's 8th combined army of the southern military district, was killed by a Ukrainian strike at Chornobaivka airbase.
  - US president Biden speaks with Chinese Communist Party general secretary Xi Jinping for nearly two hours about the war in Ukraine, and warned against any support for the invasion.
  - Two military bases in Mykolaiv were bombed by Russian fighter jets, killing dozens of Ukrainian troops. "Of the approximately 200 who were there, I would guess about 90 percent did not survive," according to a surviving Ukrainian soldier, who was sleeping in the barracks opposite where the attack hit at one of the locations.
  - It was confirmed that Russia launched Hypersonic missiles against Ukraine, marking the first known use of such missiles in combat, according to US officials. They were used to destroy a military ammunition warehouse in Delyatin.
  - New Zealand PM Jacinda Ardern reiterated her support for Ukraine during a call with PM Denys Shmyhal.
  - Australia announced new sanctions against 11 Russian banks and government entities, according to Foreign Minister Marise Payne.
  - The UN announced it had completed the first convoy of humanitarian aid to Sumy. "The 130 metric tons of essential aid included medical supplies, bottled water, ready-to-eat meals and canned food that will directly help some 35,000 people. In addition to these items, the convoy brought equipment to repair water systems to help 50,000 people," according to UN Crisis Coordinator for Ukraine Amin Awad.
  - Zelenskyy announced a new assistance plan for Ukrainians displaced by the invasion. The plan included helping displaced people find jobs, providing housing and organizing efforts to rebuild destroyed houses once the war is over, and providing support to families housing people who fled occupied territories.
- 19 March (Day 24)
  - Zelenskyy claimed the Russian military sustained "unprecedented losses" and that some Russian units were "80 to 90% destroyed" in a video posted to social media.
  - Some captured residents from besieged Mariupol were taken to camps and redirected to remote cities in Russia, according to the Mariupol City Council. Russia denied these accusations.
  - Two children and one woman were killed in Rubizhne after the residential building they were in was destroyed by Russian artillery fire, according to the Ukrainian emergency services.
  - Eight evacuation corridors operated, but due to Russian shelling, authorities were unable to rescue people from Borodyanka.
  - The Russian cosmonauts who recently arrived at the International Space Station wearing yellow and blue spacesuits were not supporting Ukraine, but the Bauman Moscow State Technical University and its colors.
- 20 March (Day 25)
  - Mariupol rejected Russia's demand to surrender, calling it a "false choice".
  - US president Biden would travel to Warsaw on March 25, following his meetings in Brussels with NATO allies, G7, and European Union leaders, according to a statement from White House press secretary Jen Psaki.
  - A large shopping center caught fire and many buildings were destroyed in Kyiv's Podilskyi District following Russian bombardment, according to Ukraine State Emergency Services. One person was killed following the explosions.
  - Almost 7,295 people evacuated Mariupol using four humanitarian corridors, 3,900 of them by using the Mariupol to Zaporizhzhia line by buses and private transport.
  - The National Security and Defense Council of Ukraine banned 10 pro-Russian political parties Opposition Platform – For Life, Party of Shariy along with Derzhava, Left Opposition, Nashi, Opposition Bloc, Progressive Socialist Party of Ukraine, Socialist Party of Ukraine, Union of Leftists, and the Volodymyr Saldo Bloc.
- 21 March (Day 26)
  - Satellite images showed growing flooding of the Irpin River. This river was crucial to the Russians, as their forces could not take Kyiv from the west if they could not cross the river. It was unclear how the flooding began.
  - The UN Human Rights office (OHCHR) released new numbers: 925 civilians were killed in Ukraine, but said actual figures were likely to be "considerably higher".
  - Russian soldiers bombed a school in Mariupol where around 400 civilians had taken refuge. “They are under the rubble, and we don't know how many of them have survived... but we know that we will certainly shoot down the pilot who dropped that bomb, like about 100 other such mass murderers whom we already have downed." Russian soldiers in Kherson also shot "at people who peacefully took to the streets without weapons" all according to President Zelenskyy said in a Telegram message.
  - More than 8,000 people were rescued through evacuation corridors. "Thank you to everyone who did it, who worked for the people. We also managed to deliver 200 tons of humanitarian aid," President Zelenskyy also said on Telegram.
  - The European Association of Zoos and Aquaria (EAZA) individual donors and institutions have helped them raise €576,371 ($635,000) to help operations at Ukrainian zoos impacted by Russia's invasion.
- 22 March (Day 27)
  - After days of fighting, Ukrainian forces regained control of Makariv, according to the Armed Forces of Ukraine Facebook account.
  - Former Canadian Air Force sniper Wali, rumored to have been killed by Russia, announced "I'm alive" in a video call.
  - A successful counterattack was carried out north and west of Kyiv, slowing Russian efforts to encircle the city and threatening the ability of Russian forces to resupply the exposed forward units north of the city.
  - Zelenskyy thanked Pope Francis for his clear and strong position against the war and invited him to visit Ukraine if possible. "I thank His Holiness for his clear and strong position against the war and for his prayers for Ukraine. I invited him to visit our country at this most crucial time."
  - Biden announced plans to sanction hundreds of members of Russia's lower legislative Duma.
  - Zelenskyy claimed that Ukrainian Armed Forces took down a Russian plane in the Kharkiv region near Chuhuiv, but this claim was unverified.
- 23 March (Day 28)
  - Putin discussed the situation in Ukraine with German Chancellor Olaf Scholz. The discussion "focused on the problems of the ongoing negotiations between Russian and Ukrainian representatives," according to a Kremlin statement.
  - In a significant push, Ukraine's military forces pushed Russian forces east of Kyiv back to 55 km away. This came after Russia had been 20 km to 30 km away for the weeks, according to a senior defense official.
  - Troops in Chernihiv succeeded in slightly pushing back some Russian forces that had surrounded the city for weeks.
  - According to an official, Russia was "starting to prioritize" their operations in the Donbas region, particularly around Luhansk.
  - Russian military activity increased around Odesa, leading to speculation of a possible attack to "pin down Ukrainian forces".
- 24 March (Day 29)
  - Zelenskyy thanked the European Council members for sanctions on Russia, but said "it was a little late".
  - Ukraine conducted a series of successful attacks against Russian ships in occupied Berdiansk, including a landing ship and ammunition depots, according to US and UK officials.
  - Australia imposed sanctions on Belarusian president Alexander Lukashenko and his family for supporting Russia's invasion, as well as 22 "Russian propagandists and disinformation operatives," including senior editors from Russia Today, Strategic Culture Foundation, InfoRos, and NewsFront.
  - Workers at the Chernobyl nuclear plant were put at risk by Russian shelling in a nearby town, according to the IAEA. "[It endangers] the homes and families of those operational personnel that ensure the nuclear and radiation safety".
- 25 March (Day 30)

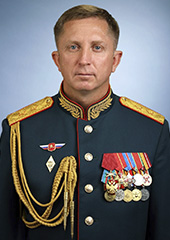
A portrait of Yakov Rezantsev, who reportedly became the seventh Russian general officer to be killed in Ukraine during the 2022 Chornobaivka attacks on 25 March

  - Lt Gen Yakov Rezantsev, commander of Russia's 49th combined army, was reportedly killed in a strike at Chornobaivka airbase near Kherson by Ukrainian forces.
  - Biden arrived in Rzeszów, Poland to support Ukraine.
  - Russia released new official numbers of their casualties in Ukraine: 1,351 deaths.
  - The United Kingdom sent $2.6 million in dried food, canned goods, and water to Ukraine.
  - Global police organization Interpol dispatched a team to Moldova amid reports of human trafficking linked to the arrival of around 400,000 refugees from Ukraine.
  - Putin signed a law mandating sentences of up to 15 years if found guilty of "spreading fake news about the work of officials abroad" or about what was happening in Ukraine.
  - It was reported that looters had broken into and stolen radioactive waste and isotopes from the Chernobyl nuclear plant.
- 26 March (Day 31)
  - Zelenskyy demanded military equipment and hardware from Western nations in a late-night video address. "This is all for not only the freedom of Ukraine, but for the freedom of Europe". Several countries promised to send anti-armor and anti-aircraft missiles as well as small arms.
  - In Warsaw, Biden said that Putin "cannot remain in power." This comment was retracted minutes later by a senior administration official telling reporters: “The president's point was that Putin cannot be allowed to exercise power over his neighbors or the region. He was not discussing Putin's power in Russia, or regime change.”
  - Russian forces fired at a nuclear research facility in Kharkiv, according to the Ukrainian parliament.
  - We learn that three people were killed when Russian forces took control of Slavutych, where the workers of the Chernobyl nuclear plant live back in February, according to a local mayor.
- 27 March (Day 32)
  - A White House pool reporter asksed Biden if he was calling for a regime change in Russia. "No," he replied.
  - A rocket hit an oil base in the Volyn region, according to regional governor Yuriy Pohulyaiko.
  - The Russian military captured Kamyanka and two other villages south of Izium, but Ukrainian forces claimed to have recaptured all three villages.
  - Turkish president Recep Tayyip Erdogan stressed the need for a cease-fire in Ukraine on a telephone call with Putin, according to Erdogan's office. Erdogan also called for an improvement to the humanitarian situation in the region.
- 28 March (Day 33)
  - Ukrainian forces retook control of Lukyanivka, a village 60 kilometers east of Kyiv.
  - The U.S. Defense Department reported more Russian "ground activity" against Ukrainian forces in the Donbas region, assessing that Russia was "prioritizing" the eastern region. Ukraine military officials said they were launching counter offensives against this.
  - Ukrainian officials announced they would not open humanitarian corridors for civilians Monday, citing intelligence reports warning of Russian provocations along the routes.
  - A Russian missile attack hit an oil depot in the Rivne region, according to Rivne's regional governor. It was the second attack on oil facility in the region and the latest in a series of such attacks in recent days.
  - In-person ceasefire talks between Ukraine and Russia were scheduled to begin the next day in Istanbul.
  - Japan said it would ban the export of luxury goods to Russia in its latest response to Russia's invasion, to take effect April 5, according to the Ministry of Economy, Trade, and Industry in a statement.
  - Novaya Gazeta, one of Russia's last major independent news outlets, suspended publication after a new warning from the country's media regulator. The newspaper's now-former editor-in-chief Dmitry Muratov planned to auction off the Nobel Peace Prize he earned last year to raise money for donations to Ukrainian refugees.
- 29 March (Day 34)
  - Delegations to peace talks between Russia and Ukraine met in Istanbul for the first time in weeks. At the talks, Ukraine delivered a proposal for accepting a neutral and nonnuclear status in exchange for security guarantees, meaning it would not join military alliances or host military bases, according to Ukrainian negotiators.
  - Colonel Denis Kurilo, Russian commander of the 200th separate motorized rifle brigade, was killed outside Kharkiv, Ukraine claimed.
  - Russian officials said they would "significantly" scale back military activity around Kyiv and Chernihiv, clarifying this was also not a ceasefire. U.S. officials were hesitant to believe Russia.
- 30 March (Day 35)
  - Around a fifth of the Russian forces around Kyiv started moving north toward Belarus according to The Pentagon. This was believed to be strategic, so that the Russians could resupply and regroup for potential deployments elsewhere in Ukraine. The UK Ministry of Defence said this deployment would most likely be to Eastern Ukraine.
  - The number of Ukrainians fleeing abroad topped 4 million, according to the U.N. refugee agency. Of these, around 350,000 people fled to Russia, and officials in besieged Mariupol accused the Russian military of forcibly deporting thousands of city residents to Russia.
  - Ukrainian forces repelled several Russian attacks in the Donetsk oblast and Luhansk oblast.
- 31 March (Day 36)
  - A large humanitarian convoy of 45 buses set out for Mariupol to bring supplies and evacuate some residents lacking food, water, and power, Ukrainian officials said. On the way, the convoy was blocked by Russian forces from reaching its destination near Berdyansk.
  - Russian forces also stopped another humanitarian convoy of 12 buses going to Melitopol and confiscated 14 tons of humanitarian aid according to Vereshchuk, the Ukrainian minister of reintegration of temporarily occupied territories.
  - The Russian Defense Ministry said the military would reopen the humanitarian corridor from Mariupol to Zaporizhzhia the next day at the request of the leaders of France and Germany.
  - Russian troops appeared to be moving away from the Chernobyl nuclear plant, according to a senior U.S. defense official.
  - Peace talks with Russia were set to resume over video the next day, according to Ukraine's lead negotiator.

=== April ===
- 1 April (Day 37)
  - The Ukrainian military confirmed that Izium had officially fallen, and was under Russian control, ending the month-long Battle of Izium.
  - 86 Ukrainian soldiers, 15 of them women, were released from Russian captivity in the second prisoner swap of the war in Zaporizhzhia Oblast. The number of Russian soldiers swapped was unknown.
  - The US announced they were sending $300 million in "security assistance" for Kyiv to bolster its defence capabilities amid Russia's attacks.
  - Russia claimed two Ukrainian helicopters made a rare strike across the border, hitting an oil tank facility in Belgorod. President Zelenskyy declined to say whether he had ordered the raid. Ukraine officials denied this allegation.
  - According to the mayor of Kyiv, "huge" battles were being fought to the north and east of Kyiv.
  - New numbers came out: a total of 6,266 people were able to evacuate and flee the violence, including more than 3,000 from the besieged city of Mariupol according to an official.
  - A call between Chinese Communist Party leader Xi Jinping and President Zelenskyy wa "just a matter a time", according to a Chinese diplomat.
- 2 April (Day 38)
  - 30 towns are cities are retaken in Northern Ukraine and around Kyiv after a massive Russian retreat. "Irpin, Bucha, Hostomel and the whole Kyiv region were liberated from the invader" deputy defence minister Hanna Maliar claims.
  - The Ukrainian flag is raised over Chernobyl nuclear plant after complete Russian troop withdrawal from Chernobyl.
  - Russian police detain 211 people at protests against Moscow's military operation in Ukraine, according to an NGO.
  - Peace talks between Ukraine and Russia have progressed enough to "conduct direct consultations," according to a Ukrainian negotiator. Turkish President Erdogan confirms he spoke to both countries on Friday, and "seemed to confirm for his part that they were ready to organise a meeting in the near future."
- 3 April (Day 39)
  - Ukrainian forces retaking control over the Kyiv region report war atrocities and potential war crimes from the ground.
  - Zelenskyy in a pre-recorded message urged to those at the Grammy Awards in Las Vegas to "tell our story, tell the truth about war" on social media and television.
  - There was heavy fighting and airstrikes across Mariupol, according to the UK Defense Ministry.
  - Almost 80% of all residential buildings in Izium were reported to have been destroyed after Russian forces took the city on 1 April. There was no power, heating, or water in the city, and it was still impossible to make casualty estimates, according to Deputy mayor of Izium Volodymyr Matsokin.
  - Russia's lead negotiator said talks with Ukraine would resume on the morrow.
- 4 April (Day 40)
  - A mass grave was uncovered in Bucha. Kyiv Regional Police and local residents said they believed at least 150 people were buried there, but the mayor said the death toll could be as high as 300. President Zelenskyy visits the mass grave.
  - Biden called for Putin to be put on trial for war crimes over Russia's killings in Ukraine.
  - The U.S. was to impose further sanctions on Russia after the Bucha massacre, while Russia denied that its military killed any civilians.
  - Zelenskyy planned to address the United Nations Security Council on the morrow.
- 5 April (Day 41)
  - Zelenskyy accused Russian troops of indiscriminately killing civilians "just for their pleasure" before the United Nations Security Council, questioning the very mandate of the Security Council itself in his speech.
  - New footage from besieged Mariupol showed around 90% of residential buildings had been damaged or destroyed as a result of intense bombardment, according to Ukrainian officials.
  - The European Union proposed a ban on Russian coal after the Bucha massacre.
  - An evacuation convoy on its way to Mariupol was turned back by Russian forces, according to Deputy PM Iryna Vereshchuk, complicating ongoing humanitarian efforts.
  - An estimated 3,800 people were evacuated via humanitarian corridors.
- 6 April (Day 42)
  - Pope Francis condemns the Bucha massacre towards his weekly audience in Vatican City. "Stop this war! Let the weapons fall silent! Stop sowing death and destruction," he also said.
  - The US Senate unanimously passes legislation authorizing President Biden to use a lend-lease program, last used in World War II, to speed up the delivery of military equipment to Ukraine.
  - 11 humanitarian corridors are to open today; Mariupol to Zaporizhzhia, Berdiansk to Zaporizhzhia, Tokmak to Zaporizhzhia, Enerhodar to Zaporizhzhia, Huliaipole and Melitopol to Zaporizhzhia, Sievierodonetsk to Bakhmut, Lysychansk to Bakhmut, Popasna to Bakhmut, Rubizhne to Bakhmut, and from Hirske to Bakhmut.
  - Russian soldiers are starting to hide the bodies of the people they kill to avoid the world's condemnation according to President Zelenskyy in a nightly address.
  - Russia is struggling to recruit enough combat-ready reinforcements to fight in Eastern Ukraine, according to American and other Western military and intelligence officials.
  - The Boston Marathon set to take place on April 18 will not allow runners from Russia or Belarus to compete because of the war in Ukraine.
- 7 April (Day 43)
  - The United Nations General Assembly votes to suspend Russia from the UN Human Rights Council following global outrage from the Bucha massacre. There are 93 nations who voted in favor, 24 nations against, and 58 nations that abstained.
  - Ukrainian officials are urging residents of the eastern regions of Donetsk, Luhansk, and Kharkiv to evacuate immediately, as the Russians are believed to be regrouping for a potential new attack in the east.
  - NATO expresses support for providing "new and heavier equipment" to Ukraine from outrage over Russia's atrocities against civilians.
  - U.S. and European allies meet in Brussels to discuss providing more military aid to Ukraine.
  - Russia's foreign minister Sergei Lavrov accuses Ukraine of backpedaling on a draft peace deal, changing demands related to Crimea, among other things. Ukrainian officials dismiss this as propaganda, citing that Lavrov was not actually on the negotiating team.
  - The popular once-former band Pink Floyd reunites to make its first single in 28 years titled "Hey, Hey, Rise Up!" based on a performance from a frontman the Ukrainian band 'BoomBox', Andriy Khlyvnyuk. The single is to be released at midnight tomorrow with proceeds going to Ukrainian humanitarian relief.
- 8 April (Day 44)
  - The Russian military conducts a rocket strike on a railway station used for evacuating civilians in Kramatorsk, killing 57 people and wounding 109 according to officials. This is condemned many European officials. Russia's defense ministry denies carrying out the attack.
  - President Zelenskyy says in a speech that the situation in Borodyanka is "much worse" with "even more victims" than in Bucha. Authorities have found "650 dead bodies" according to Ukraine's prosecutor general Iryna Venediktova.
  - A funeral is held for Russian Colonel Alexander Bespalov, commander of the 59th Guards Tank Regiment, in Ozersk. He was killed 'during a special military operation in Ukraine' according to local reporting.
  - European Commission President Ursula von der Leyen meets with President Zelenskyy in Kyiv.
  - Slovakia transfers a S-300 missile system to Ukraine, and the Czech Republic sends tanks and infantry fighting vehicles, fulfilling one of President Zelenskyy's top requests to help the country defend against Russia's bombing campaign, according to Slovakia's PM Eduard Heger.
  - Prices for grains, vegetable oils, and other food commodities reach their highest levels on record according to the United Nations Food and Agriculture Organization because of the war in Ukraine.
- 9 April (Day 45)
  - United Kingdom PM Boris Johnson visits Kyiv to meet with President Zelenskyy "in a show of solidarity with the Ukrainian people," according to British and Ukrainian officials. In the meeting, PM Johnson pledges continued military assistance, 120 armored vehicles, new anti-ship missile systems, and guaranteed an additional $500 million in World Bank lending to Ukraine, according to his UK office.
  - President Zelenskyy also holds talks with Austrian chancellor Karl Nehammer. Nehammer announced that he will also be meeting on 11 April in Moscow with Russian president Putin as well, becoming the first European leader to do so in person since the beginning of the war.
  - "132 tormented bodies of tortured, murdered citizens" are found in Makariv as Ukrainian forces continue to advance into areas liberated by Russian forces, according to Ukraine's Ministry of Defence.
  - Russian president Putin appoints Army Gen. Alexander Dvornikov, commander of Russia's Southern Military District, the new commander of Russia's military campaign in Ukraine after the previous general's failure to take Kyiv, according to a US and European officials.
  - The executive board of the International Monetary Fund (IMF) approves an account for Ukraine that would allow countries to donate aid. Canada proposes up to 1 billion Canadian dollars in its federal budget for the account, according to the IMF.
  - "Abnormally high" radiation is recorded in areas of the Chernobyl Exclusion Zone where Russian troops dug trenches and tried to build fortifications when they occupied the site until late last month.
- 10 April (Day 46)
  - President Zelenskyy holds a phone call with German Chancellor Olaf Scholz, discussing additional assistance, war crimes happening in Ukraine, candidacy to join the EU, and "how to strengthen sanctions against Russia and... force Russia to seek peace."
  - Newly released Maxar Technologies satellite imagery shows an 8-mile (13 km) convoy of military vehicles heading south through Ukraine to Donbas.
  - Russian forces shell Kharkiv and send reinforcements toward Izium in an attempt to break Ukrainian defenses, according to a Ukrainian military commander.
  - A "big enemy military equipment convoy that was moving towards Izium direction was destroyed" by Ukrainian forces, according to Oleh Syniehubov, head of the Kharkiv regional military administration.
  - Russian air-launched missiles are claimed to have hit Ukraine's S-300 air-defense missile systems in southern Mykolaiv Oblast and at an air base in Chuhuiv, according to Russian Defense Ministry spokesman, Maj. Gen. Igor Konashenkov.
  - The Dnipro airport is hit by two Russian missiles, according to the regional governor. Sea-launched Russian cruise missiles also reportedly destroy the headquarters of a Ukrainian military unit stationed farther west in the Dnipro Oblast.
  - The number of Ukrainians who have fled the country since the beginning of the war reaches 4.5 million, according to the UNHCR.
- 11 April (Day 47)
  - Austrian Chancellor Karl Nehammer holds a meeting with Russian President Putin in Moscow, becoming the first European leader to do so since the beginning of the war. Nehammer said he brought up the Russian atrocities in Ukraine during a "tough" and "unfriendly" meeting.
  - The defense of besieged Mariupol continues with heavy fighting and bombardment throughout the day, according to Gen. Valery Zaluzhny, commander of the Armed Forces of Ukraine. President Zelenskyy claims in his nightly video address to the nation that the siege of Mariupol could be ended with the proper military weapons.
  - Reports of a possible Russian strike involving chemical weapons takes place in Mariupol. While unconfirmed, President Zelenskyy warns that the possibility should be taken seriously. Mariupol officials and the UK are working to verify the claim.
  - Russian troops retreating from parts of northern Ukraine deliberately left "tens if not hundreds of thousands" of unexploded land mines, according to President Zelenskyy in his nightly video address, in what he considered a "war crime".
  - Ukraine is currently investigating 5,800 cases of Russian war crimes, with "more and more" proceedings every day, according to the Prosecutor General of Ukraine.
  - Indian PM Narendra Modi and US president Biden hold a virtual meeting to discuss the two nations differing stances on Ukraine, with India being currently non-aligned. India, while staying firm in its stance despite growing pressure from the US, does promote the end of the war without criticizing Russia.
- 12 April (Day 48)
  - Viktor Medvedchuk, a key pro-Russia Ukrainian politician and oligarch, is detained in a "special operation" by the SBU, according to President Zelenskyy in a telegram. Zelenskyy has plans to use Medvedchuk in a future prisoner swap for Ukrainian POWs.
  - Presidents from the nations of Poland, Lithuania, Latvia, and Estonia visit Kyiv in Mariinskyi Palace to "send a strong signal of common European solidarity with Ukraine" and to discuss continued commitment to supporting Ukraine politically and with military aid. The leaders also visited the sites of possible war crimes in nearby Borodianka. German President Frank-Walter Steinmeier also offered to visit to Ukraine along with the Polish and Baltic presidents, but the trip was "not wanted" by Kyiv. This is believed to have been said because Steinmeier is considered to have had close relations with Russia in previous political roles.
  - A five-hour battle takes place in the Polohy Raion as Ukrainian forces tried to liberate the area. After units of the region's territorial defense brigade occupied part of the district, Russian reinforcements forced them to withdraw, according to Col. Ivan Arefyev, spokesperson for the Zaporizhzhia Regional Military Administration.
  - The US cannot confirm the use of chemical weapons in Ukraine still, according to US Secretary of State Antony Blinken, but noted that they "had credible information that Russian forces may use a variety of riot control agents".
  - The Ukrainian Postal Service Ukrposhta releases a stamp depicting an illustration from the Attack on Snake Island, in which Ukrainian soldiers refused to surrender, responding instead with "Russian warship, go fuck yourself".
  - US President Biden first uses the word "genocide" to describe the events going on in Ukraine in an event in Iowa. President Zelenskyy refers to the gesture as "true words of a true leader", after he first used the word on 3 April to describe the Bucha massacre.
  - The French Ministry of Finance publishes a detailed list of Russian assets worth €23.7 billion it has frozen since the beginning of Russia's invasion of Ukraine.
- 13 April (Day 49)
  - Ukraine claims it hit the Russian cruiser Moskva with two anti-ship Neptune cruise missiles in the Black Sea, according to Ukrainian officials and the US Defense Department. The Russian Ministry of Defence claims otherwise, that the warship Moskva was evacuated after a fire onboard detonated ammunition, seriously damaging the vessel, according to Russian state media. Both accounts confirm that the warship did in fact catch fire.
  - The Russian military threatens to strike Ukrainian "decision-making centers" in response to what Russia said were "attempts of sabotage and strikes" on Russian territory, said Russian Ministry of Defense spokesperson Maj. Gen. Igor Konashenkov.
  - The US announces that it is sending an additional $800 million (€740 million) worth of weapons, ammunition, and other security assistance to Ukraine. Part of the new deal includes the sending of 11 Mil Mi-17 helicopters, 18 155mm Howitzer cannons, 300 more Switchblade drones, and radar systems capable of tracking incoming fire and pinpointing its origin. Some Biden administration officials viewed as too much of an escalation risk just a few weeks ago.
  - The European Union also approves an additional €500 million for military equipment for the Ukrainian Armed Forces, according to a news release from the European Council of the European Union.
  - President Zelenskyy and US President Biden talk in a telephone conversation for 58 minutes to discuss ongoing US support for Ukraine, "assessed Russian war crimes" and "agreed to enhance sanctions," according to the White House and a Twitter post from Zelenskyy.
  - Colombian president Iván Duque says in an interview in response to US president Biden's calling the war in Ukraine "genocide", "what is happening in Ukraine is a genocide. And it has to stop... This is insane". This comes after Colombia increased their power production to help meet the needs of the western world after all shipments of Russia have been cut off.

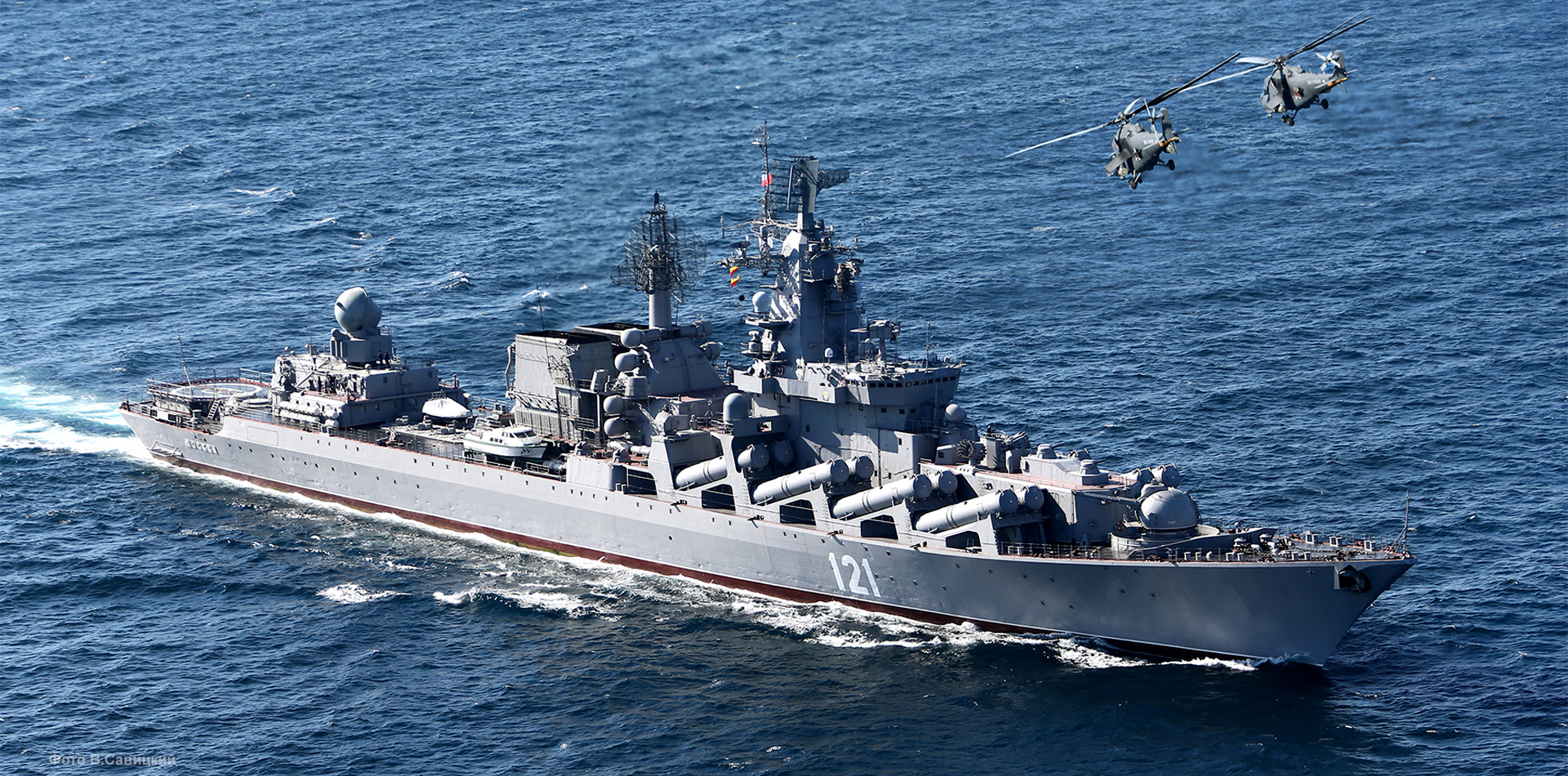
A picture of the Russian cruiser Moskva from 2012, which was sunk by a Ukrainian strike on 14 April

- 14 April (Day 50)
  - The Russian warship Moskva sinks in the Black Sea, marking a major victory for Ukraine. The Russian Navy attempted to tow the damaged ship toward Sevastopol, but it sank before reaching port. New information comes out that Moskva was one of the ships involved in the Attack of Snake Island, which took place on 25 February. Moskva is the largest warship to be sunk in combat since World War II.
  - Russian troops open fire on a bus convoy evacuating residents from Borova, killing 7 people and wounding 27.
  - Russian officials accuse Ukraine of sending two helicopters 10 km into Russia's Bryansk region, and bombing a residential building in Klimovo, injuring eight people. Ukraine denies the attack, accusing Russia of staging the incident to stir up "anti-Ukrainian hysteria".
  - A number of residential areas in Kharkiv come under shelling from Russian forces, with the heaviest bombings in the direction of Izium, according to the head of Ukraine's Kharkiv region military administration Oleh Syniehubov.
  - Ukrainian authorities conduct an "organized evacuation" of Barvinkove and Lozova in south of the Kharkiv region, according to Oleh Syniehubov.
  - Protesters in the United States project the flag of Ukraine on the side of the Russian embassy in Washington DC. The Russian embassy responded with spotlights to try to blot the flag out.
- 15 April (Day 51)
  - There is a possibility that the Russian warship Moskva, which sunk yesterday, may have been carrying nuclear weapons when it went down, according to some Ukrainian exports. Two senior US intelligence officials dispute this claim, releasing a statement that they do not believe the ship was carrying nuclear arms. There is also a possibility the warship may have had a piece of the True Cross on board when it sank as well, citing a Russian media report from 2020.
  - Russian strikes are "getting more intense" across the Donetsk, Luhansk, and Kharkiv regions amid warnings of a major Russian offensive in the coming days.
  - The Vizar military facility that produced and repaired anti-aircraft and anti-ship missile systems near Kyiv is bombed by Russian long-range Kalibr missiles, according to Russian defence ministry spokesman Igor Konashenkov and Ukrainian witnesses. This happened in response to the Russian-claimed helicopter bombing of a residential building in Klimovo yesterday, which Ukraine denies ever taking place.
  - At 4:30 pm, wide Russian rocket launcher shelling across the industrial district of Kharkiv injures at least 35 people and kills 10, including a 7-month-old baby, according to Ukraine's general prosecutor's office.
  - Five civilians are killed and 15 injured in a cluster bomb attack in Mykolaiv, according to the city's governor Vitaliy Kim in a telegram. Ukraine and Russia were some of the few countries to not ban cluster munitions back in a 2008 UN referendum.
  - Sviatoslav Shevchuk, Ukraine's ambassador to the Vatican and the archbishop of Kyiv denounces the Vatican's plan to have a Ukrainian woman and a Russian woman carry the cross together during the Good Friday mass procession there. He objected on what he saw as an idea of reconciliation, while Ukraine is still being ravaged by war unleashed by Russia.
  - Ukraine announces it is sending top officials including PM Denys Shmyhal, Finance Minister Serhiy Marchenko, and central bank governor Kyrylo Shevchenko to Washington DC for the IMF and World Bank meeting next week, where discussion will focus on the Russian invasion and its impact on global economy.
- 16 April (Day 52)
  - The $800 million (€740 million) weapons package the US announced it would be sending to Ukraine on 14 April "have begun arriving," according to a White House official. The package is to be picked up at the border by Ukrainians and taken into the country. This package brings the total amount of military assistance the US has provided to Ukraine to more than $3 billion (€2.8 billion).
  - Vladimir Petrovich Frolov, deputy commander of Russia's 8th Army, death in combat is announced and a funeral is subsequently held at St. Petersburg in Serafimovskoe Cemetery. According to Tsargrad TV, he died no earlier than 11 April 2022.
  - The Russian Armed Forces claim to have "completely cleared" the city of Mariupol of Ukrainian forces. This is considered propaganda as fierce fighting continues in the city days after this claim.
  - Russia claims that their troops have killed more than 4,000 soldiers in Mariupol. According to Kyiv however, the total troop losses nationwide so far in the war are between 2,500 and 3,000.
  - President Zelenskyy vows to rebuild the cities and towns destroyed by war, especially Mariupol. "Of course, this is a huge amount of work. But still less than defending the state in war." Zelenskyy also added that this could be a time for the "real modernization of our cities," in the video address.
  - Russian Ministry of Defense spokesperson Maj. Gen. Igor Konashenkov claims the Russian military shot down a Ukrainian military transport plane "delivering a large batch of weapons supplied to Ukraine by Western countries." This claim remains unconfirmed, as Russia has claimed to have destroyed more Ukrainian military aircraft than were known to be in Ukraine's inventory, according to open-source information.
- 17 April (Day 53)
  - Most remaining Ukrainian soldiers in Mariupol and a "large group of civilians" are forced to take shelter inside the giant Azovstal steel factory after Russian forces push further into the besieged city. A surrender-or-die ultimatum is proposed by Russia which urged the soldiers inside the steel factory to lay down their arms by 6 am Moscow time and to evacuate before 1 pm. This is meet by no response by the Ukrainian forces.
  - Foreign Minister Dmytro Kuleba says in an interview that Mariupol has not fallen, but basically "doesn't exist anymore," because "the Russian army... [have] decided to raze the city to the ground at any cost." An estimated 10,000 civilians, and potentially many more, have died in the month-long siege according to Mariupol's mayor.
  - Ukrainian government officials complete a European Union questionnaire required to begin a membership application, according to presidential aid Ihor Zhvokva. European Commission President Ursula von der Leyen ceremonially gave the paperwork to President Zelenskyy during her visit to Kyiv on 8 April.
  - Mykolaiv and the surrounding areas have come under continuous rocket attacks since Sunday morning, according to the regional governor Vitaliy Kim. The targets have included power grids, houses, and playgrounds, and that Kalibr missiles had disrupted water and power supplies to the city as well.
  - At least 18 deaths are reported from four days of shelling in Kharkiv, according to Ukrainian officials.
  - PM Denys Shmyhal argues for "more money for executing our humanitarian and social obligations," ahead of the IMF and World Bank meeting to take place in Washington DC later this week. As of now, Ukraine is running a budget deficit of about $5 billion (€4.6 billion) a month.
- 18 April (Day 54)
  - Since the withdraw of Russian troops from northern Ukraine on 1–2 April to be redeployed to the east, the awaited "Battle for Donbas" begins in Eastern Ukraine. This is confirmed by President Zelenskyy in his nightly address, saying also that "a very large part of the entire Russian army is now focused on this offensive".
  - Russian forces increase their attacks on the strategic eastern cities of Mykolaiv, Mariupol, Kherson, Izyum, and Sloviansk in the new Russian offensive.
  - The eastern city of Kreminna is taken by Russian forces amid the new offensive after "leveling everything to the ground" according to Ukraine officials. Russian artillery fire into the city reportedly started Sunday night into continued into Monday, killing four civilians.
  - Ukraine claims to have recaptured a "number of settlements" in or near the Izium raion, according to Oleksandr Motuzianyk, a spokesman for the Ukrainian Ministry of Defense. This comes after Russian forces in the city were beginning mass deportations of city residents towards mainland Russian territory.
  - At least 7 people are killed and 11 injured after a Russian missile strike the hits Lviv. The missiles strike three military targets and a fourth hit a tire-fitting garage, according to the regional governor Maksym Kozytskyy.
  - The European Union plans to establish a solidarity trust fund to finance "a bulk of the costs" of post-war reconstruction. The details are planned to be discuss by senior officials in Brussels and Washington to ensure the enormous amount of money is not misused, according to EU officials.
- 19 April (Day 55)
  - Russia issues another deadline for Ukrainian soldiers inside of the Azovstal steel factory in Mariupol to surrender, saying the lives of the troops inside will be spared if they stop what they called "senseless resistance". At least 1,000 civilians are hiding in shelters beneath the vast steel plant, according to the Mariupol City Council.
  - Russia opens a "safe" humanitarian corridor to leave Mariupol at 2 pm for "the withdrawal of Ukrainian military personnel who voluntarily laid down their arms," according to the Russian Defense Ministry. Russia denies Ukraine the ability to make their own humanitarian corridor.
  - China decides to strengthen its strategic ties with Russia, reaffirming support for Russian president Putin as his forces face allegations of war crimes for killing civilians, according to Vice Foreign Minister Le Yucheng.
  - The US prepares another aid package similar in size to the previous one worth $800 million (€740 million), according to NBC.
  - France announces that it is willing to provide security guarantees to Ukraine once the war is over, according to a senior official at the French presidency. The guarantees involve the delivery of military equipment with other countries such as Germany, Italy, and Turkey also potentially involved.
  - Ukraine for the first time since 10 March manages to restore direct communication with the Chernobyl nuclear plant, according to International Atomic Energy Agency Director General Rafael Mariano Grossi in a statement.
  - Russian and Belarusian tennis players will be banned from participating in the Wimbledon tournament in the UK in June, most notably barring men's world No. 2 Daniil Medvedev from competing because of the war in Ukraine.
- 20 April (Day 56)
  - The deadline for the Russian ultimatum to Ukrainian troops inside of the Azovstal steel factory in Mariupol to surrender-or-die expires with no mass capitulation. The commander of a unit believed to be holding out in the besieged city said his forces could survive just days or hours.
  - Ukraine's military intelligence released intercepted Russian communications referring to an alleged order to kill Ukrainian prisoners of war in Popasna, which is bearing the full force of Russia's renewed attack.
  - More parts of the US$800 million (€740 million) weapons package arrive in Europe to be sent to Ukraine. This includes primarily the arrival of 40,000 boxes of Howitzer rounds, according to a US defense official, also saying there will be "more arriving today and in the coming days".
  - Russian forces in Ukraine's Luhansk region take control of central Rubizhne, confirmed by satellite imagery and videos circulating on social media.
  - It is announced that around 80% of the Luhansk oblast territory is under Russian control. "Russia is certainly not going to stop here and will push further on," according to Serhii Haidai, the head of the Luhansk Regional Military Administration.
  - Germany announces plans to phase out Russian oil and energy imports "by the end of the year," according to German Foreign Minister Annalena Baerbock at a news conference in Riga with Baltic Foreign Ministers. "Germany will completely phase out Russian energy imports," Baerbock added, with oil imports to "be halved by the summer" and phased out entirely and "at 0 by the end of the year".
  - Finance ministers from multiple nations, including the US and many European nations, walk out of a closed-door G20 session in Washington DC, when the Russian finance minister Anton Siluanov began speaking virtually his prepared remarks, according to a person familiar with the session. This comes after US president Biden calls for Russia to be ejected from G20, which requires the approval from all members, and China does not seem to approve.
- 21 April (Day 57)
  - Russian president Putin orders his defense minister not to storm the Azovstal steel plant complex in a televised meeting. Putin further said he would rather keep the plant sealed off "so that not even a fly comes through," and to avoid losing more Russian soldiers' lives.
  - The evacuation of civilians from besieged Mariupol is going "very slowly," according to Deputy PM Iryna Vereshchuk. Vereshchuk also commented that on Russia's side, "everything is very complicated, chaotic, slow and, of course, dishonest." 79 residents from the besieged city are safely evacuated to Zaproizhzhia.
  - President Zelenskyy warns Russia that any attempts at annexation will make their country as poor as they were "since the 1917 civil war". Zelenskyy also warned in his nightly address "any 'Kherson People's Republics' are not going to fly... it can only lead to new powerful sanctions strikes on Russia".
  - The additional funding the US announced it would be sending to Ukraine on 19 April officially is priced at $500 million (€464 million), and is intended to go towards stabilizing the economy, supporting devastated communities, and pay essential service workers.
  - Prime Ministers from Spain and Denmark arrive in Kyiv to hold meetings with President Zelenskyy. Zelenskyy thanked the Danish PM for showing readiness to support post-war reconstruction in Ukraine, particularly in Mykolaiv. Zelenskyy also separately thanked the US announcing additional funding on 19 April.
  - The village of Komyshuvakha is hit hard by Russian artillery fire over the past days, completely cutting off residents from basic services, including water.
  - Estonian and Latvian parliaments officially call Russia's war in Ukraine a genocide. Estonia cited particularly the Russian atrocities found in the towns of Bucha, Borodianka, Hostomel, Irpin, and Mariupol, while Latvia cited "extensive testimonies and evidence of brutal mass atrocities – the murders, torture, sexual violence and desecration of Ukrainian civilians". Estonia and Latvia join the likes of nations such as the US and Colombia who used the word "genocide" in previous remarks.
  - Russian men's world No. 8 tennis player Andrey Rublev calls the decision made by Wimbledon organizers to ban Russian and Belarusian players from competing because of the war in Ukraine on 19 April is "illogical" and amounts to "complete discrimination" in a post-match press conference. "At the end of the day we want to compete... [not] to talk about politics," Rublev also said. This comes after the International Swimming Federation (FINA) suspended Russian two-time Olympic champion Evgeny Rylov for nine months for attending a rally hosted by Russian president Putin in Moscow in March.
- 22 April (Day 58)
  - Russia for the first time discloses its goal in Ukraine is to "fully control Ukraine's eastern Donbas region as well as southern Ukraine" to make a land bridge from Russia to Crimea, as part of the second phase of their invasion. This also may be to connect Russia to self-proclaimed and Russian-backed Transnistria.
  - Russian shelling disrupts an attempt to evacuate civilians heavily contested Rubizhne, stopping a bus from reaching the town, according to Serhiy Haidai, the head of the Luhansk region military administration. No evacuation corridors are currently open through Russian controlled territory due to "danger on the routes," according to Deputy PM Iryna Vereshchuk. European Council President Charles Michel, and the EU's top diplomat Josep Borrell "strongly urged" for immediate and safe humanitarian passage from Mariupol and other besieged cities in a call with Russian president Putin.
  - More than 200 new graves are identified to the west of Mariupol, which can be clearly seen in photos collected by US Maxar Technologies satellite imagery.
  - UN Secretary-General António Guterres "will be received by President Vladimir Putin" on 26 April after having a working meeting and lunch with the foreign minister of Russia, according to the UN.
  - Lithuanian president Gitanas Nausėda calls on NATO to send more troops to eastern Europe, including Lithuania in case of a worst casinario Russian invasion.
  - The UK announces that it will resume its diplomatic mission in Kyiv again soon, but PM Boris Johnson warns Russia still has a "realistic possibility" of winning the war in Ukraine, calling the situation there "unpredictable" at the moment.
- 23 April (Day 59)
  - Russian long-range bombers strike a residential building in Odesa and a military site, according to Ukraine's State Emergency Services. According to Russian Defence Ministry spokesperson Igor Konashenkov, the military site was a logistics terminal at a military airfield with a "large consignment" of weapons from the US and European countries.
  - President Zelenskyy says in an interview that further accelerated weapon supplies from the United States and Europe will "be able to speed up de-occupation of our territory." This comes after Zelenskyy thanked the US for its continued and increased support in military assistance last week, "the signals, the messages, the tone on weapon supplies- everything has improved."
  - US Secretary of State Antony Blinken, and US Secretary of Defense Lloyd Austin are to visit Kyiv tomorrow (24 April), according to President Zelenskyy in a press conference.
  - Russia's First Deputy Chief of Staff Sergei Kiriyenko visits Donetsk to meet with the leaders of the self-declared Donetsk People's Republic and Luhansk People's Republic, according to Tass. Kiriyenko returns to Moscow the same day.
  - Poland launches their "Stop Russia Now" campaign, which will primarily focus on renting out billboards and advocating on social media in western Europe to try to strengthen public support for further sanctions against Russia, for "those who were brutally murdered" across Ukraine, according to Polish PM Mateusz Morawiecki. Morawiecki also singled out Germany, Italy, Austria, and France as countries that could do more to support Ukraine.
  - Turkish president Erdogan shuts Turkey's airspace off to Russian planes carrying troops to Syria, in an attempt to increase the cost of the war in Ukraine for Russia, Erdogan said in a phone conversation with Putin.

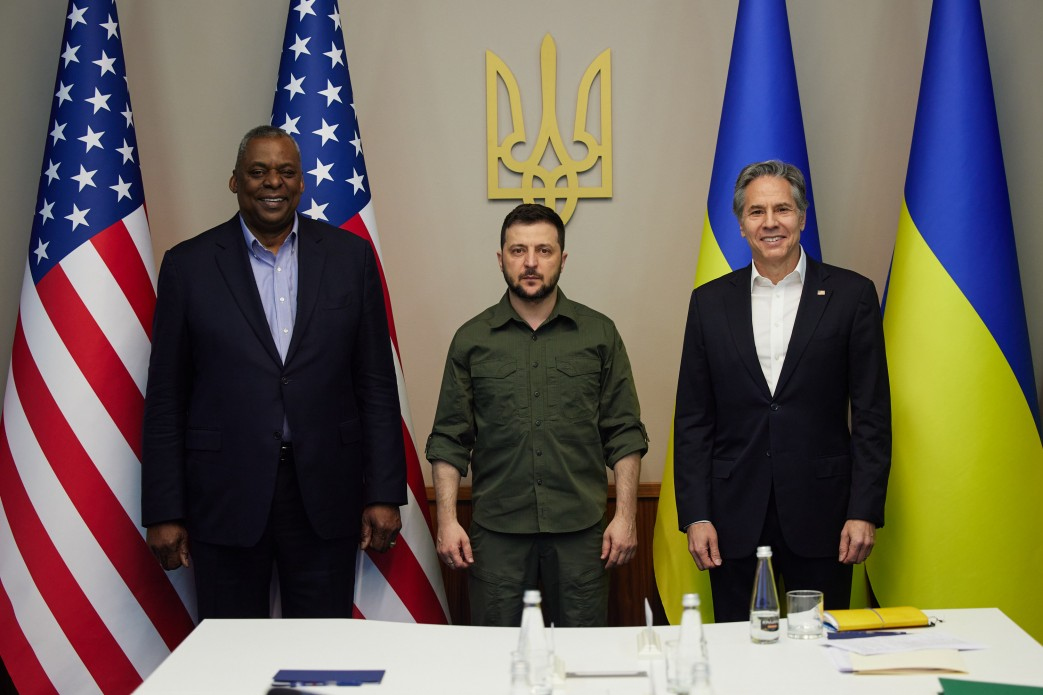
Zelenskyy posing with Blinken and Austin during the bilateral meeting on 24 April

- 24 April (Day 60)
  - US Secretary of State Antony Blinken and Defense Secretary Lloyd Austin arrive in Kyiv as announced yesterday. Blinken and Austin hold a roughly 90-minute bilateral meeting with President Zelenskyy, Foreign Minister Dmytro Kuleba, Defense Minister Oleksiy Reznikov, and Interior Minister Denys Monastyrsky, according to a senior State Department official. Blinken and Austin have become the highest-level US officials to travel to Ukraine since the Russian invasion began.
  - Russia is forcibly deporting Mariupol citizens to Primorsky Krai, according to the Ukrainian Parliament Commissioner for Human Rights.
  - Ukraine is observing and preparing for a possible Russian offensive in the Kherson region, citing bolstered defenses in the area. Oleksandr Vilkul, military head of Kryvyi Rih, said in a televised statement "we are waiting for their possible transition to the offensive in the coming days. But we know more about them than they think; we understand all their plans; and we are fully prepared for any development in the situation".
  - Nine Russian missiles strike Kremenchuk, according to Dmytro Lunin, head of the Poltava Regional Military Administration.
  - The Organization for Security and Cooperation in Europe (OSCE) is working to "facilitate the release" of several of its Special Monitoring Mission (SMM) members who have been "deprived of their liberty in Donetsk and Luhansk," OSCE posted on Twitter.
  - President Zelenskyy congratulates new French president Emmanuel Macron on his reelection, calling him a "true friend of Ukraine". "I appreciate his support and I am convinced that we are moving forward together towards new common victories," Zelenskyy also said in a Twitter post.
  - Australian PM Scott Morrison in Darwin and New Zealand PM Jacinda Ardern address the war in Ukraine and their commitment to help to the thousands of people who came out to celebrate ANZAC Day in their respective countries.
- 25 April (Day 61)
  - Russian foreign minister Sergey Lavrov insists Russia is striving to lower the risk of nuclear war, but said that the danger "is real, and it cannot be underestimated," in a Russian television conference.
  - Russia plans to stage a referendum in the occupied Kherson region. President Zelenskyy hails his people's refusal to give their backing to Russia's forces, "[they have] showed that Ukraine will definitely win," Zelenskyy said in his nightly video address.
  - Russian troops take control of the Kherson City Council, weeks after first occupying Kherson, according to two members of the city government. "Armed men entered the building... took the keys and replaced our guards with their own," said Kherson Mayor Igor Kolykhaev.
  - A nighttime curfew for Kyiv goes into effect from 10 pm to 5 am Monday to Friday this week, due to "provocative actions" from Russia, according to Oleksandr Pavliuk, the head of the Kyiv Regional Military Administration, in a Telegram post.
  - The village of Novotoshkivske is completely demolished by intense fighting for the town for more than a week, and Russian airstrikes. The Luhansk regional administrator Serhiy Hayday commented, "Unfortunately, there are almost no houses left in Novotoshkivka. Our [troops] retreated a little, but not much, because there was no longer anything to hold on to".
  - UN Secretary-General António Guterres leaves for Moscow to hold a working meeting and have lunch with Russian foreign minister Sergey Lavrov tomorrow. Guterres is also scheduled to travel to Kyiv and meet with President Zelenskyy and Foreign Minister Dmytro Kuleba on 28 April.
- 26 April (Day 62)
  - Russia struggles to find enough people to facilitate a popular vote in Kherson to create a Kherson People's Republic, and cannot hold a referendum. Russia does succeed though in replacing the local government, just 24 hours after ousting the city council yesterday, installing "the so-called 'Head of the Kherson Regional Administration,' Volodymyr Saldo, and the 'Head of the Kherson City Administration,' Oleksandr Kobets," according to the regional administrator Hennadiy Lahuta.
  - Heavy fighting in eastern Ukraine takes place. Russian forces launch missile attacks against Avdiivka, striking the central hospital, schools, and high-rise buildings, Krasnohorivka is left without electricity after Russian forces damaged a transformer, and Ukrainian forces repel a Russian attempt to attack Marinka, according to head of Donetsk regional military administration Pavlo Kyrylenko.
  - Russian President Putin says a there was a "serious breakthrough" during talks in Istanbul, with Ukrainian negotiators not bringing up security and international borders, but the situation changed "dramatically" following "a provocation in the village of Bucha, to which the Russian army has nothing to do," said Putin to UN Secretary-General António Guterres in Moscow.
  - The United States pledges a new "even heavier weapons" package for Ukraine during a meeting at a German air base, disregarding a threat from Russia that their support for Ukraine could lead to nuclear war.
  - Germany announces that it will send 50 anti-aircraft armored vehicles to Ukraine, the first time since the beginning of the war, just one day after the British government announced that it would provide Ukraine with additional anti-aircraft capabilities as well, according to US Defense Secretary Lloyd Austin in a news conference.
  - Work begins in Kyiv on dismantling the People's Friendship Arch to "Russian-Ukrainian friendship," as the monument has lost all of its ideological meaning, according to Kyiv's mayor Vilati Klitschko.
- 27 April (Day 63)
  - Russian President Putin warns any country that "intends to intervene" in Ukraine would be met with a "lightning-fast" response. The same day of this remark, Russian energy giant Gazprom stops fuel exports to Poland and Bulgaria for their refusal to pay for the previous gas in rubles.
  - The United States claims it has "credible reports" that a Russian military unit executed Ukrainians attempting to surrender near Donetsk, Ambassador-at-Large for Global Criminal Justice Beth Van Schaack announced to the UN. Schaack further went on to state there was also evidence showing "individuals killed execution-style with their hands bound; bodies showing signs of torture; horrific accounts of sexual violence against women and girls".
  - The Kherson Oblast will begin using the Russian ruble starting 1 May, according to Russian Deputy Chairman of the Civil-Military Administration Kirill Stremousov.
  - More blasts are reported in Russian regions bordering Ukraine. One blast is followed by a fire at an ammunition depot in Staraya Nelidovka, another is heard by residents in the Kursk region, and the last is heard by residents in Shilovo neighborhood of Voronezh. No civilian casualties are reported. Russian officials accuse Ukraine of mounting cross-border attacks, while government agencies say these are intended to stoke "anti-Ukrainian sentiment".
  - Another missile hits the rail and road bridge linking Odesa to far southwest Ukraine. This comes after the bridge was first hit yesterday, essentially cutting off the region. Repairs were underway when this strike took place.
  - Vice president of Russian Gazprombank Bank Igor Volobuyev leaves his job and Russia in dissent over the war in Ukraine, and is planning to join the Kyiv territorial defense. "I am Ukrainian by nationality, I was born in Akhtyrka, I could no longer observe from the outside what Russia is doing to my homeland," he also stated.
- 28 April (Day 64)
  - The bodies of 1,150 civilians are announced to have been recovered in Ukraine's Kyiv region since Russia's invasion started, according to Kyiv regional police chief Andriy Nebyton, adding that "50–70% died of firearm wounds, shot with automatic rifles."
  - US President Biden requests congress to approve a new $33 billion aid package to Ukraine. "The fight in Ukraine is the fight for freedom, and it not be cheap but it will be more costly if the world caves into Russian aggression," Biden said. Due to a lawmaker recess, enough agreed bipartisan support to pass, and the need to draft legislative language mean this package, if passed, will take a long time.
  - Deputy PM Iryna Vereshchuk announces another successful prisoner swap with Russia, "13 officers and 20 soldiers, including 5 wounded... we are also returning 12 of our civilians home." The number of Russians swapped remains unannounced.
  - Major Russian natural gas customers Germany and Austria are working on ways to accept the Russian ultimatum that final payments for gas must be made in rubles, to avoid the fate of being entirely cut off, which Poland and Bulgaria suffered yesterday. German Vice Chancellor and Economy Minister Robert Habeck has said they are working towards no longer relying on Russian oil imports, announcing Germany is now importing only 35% compared to 55% of its gas from Russia before.
  - UN Secretary-General António Guterres visits with President Zelenskyy and Foreign Minister Dmytro Kuleba in Kyiv, according to deputy spokesperson Farhan Haq. Guterres on his visit went to Borodianka and "expressed his sadness in seeing the destroyed buildings there," to the massacre site outside of St. Andrew's Church in Bucha, and the destroyed Lipki residential complex in Irpin.
  - Europe's human rights parliament adopts a resolution calling on all member and observer states to set up an international criminal tribunal to investigate and prosecute Russian politicians and soldiers allegedly committing war crimes in Ukraine.
- 29 April (Day 65)
  - Despite orders from Russia on 21 April that the Azovstal Steel Plant in besieged Mariupol should be sealed and not stormed, storming attempts by Russian forces persist, but are blocked by Ukrainian forces, and "intense" and "relentless bombardment" continues, according to Azov regiment commander Sviatoslav Palamar, currently stuck inside of the steel plant. Palamar went on to say in a video that even though food and ammunition are running low, "we do not consider giving up... if there is no other choice left but giving up, we won't give up".
  - Reports come out that Russia bombed Kyiv just one hour after UN Secretary-General António Guterres visited with President Zelenskyy yesterday. Kyiv's Mayor Vitali Klitschko said the attack was Putin's way of giving "his middle finger" to Guterres.
  - A Russian air strike destroys a major railway bridge connecting Sloviansk and Lyman across the Donets river, according to Sentinel-2 satellite imagery. This comes after reports that Russian forces "appear to be advancing" toward Sloviansk and Baranivka, according to US defense officials.
  - Ukrainian forces are becoming more serious on people accused of helping Russian troops. In the Kharkiv region alone, nearly 400 have been detained under anti-collaboration laws since the invasion began.
  - White House press secretary Jen Psaki cautions Americans against traveling to Ukraine for any reason after former US marine Willy Joseph Cancel is killed fighting alongside Ukrainian forces. "We know Americans are looking for ways to help... but we do encourage Americans to find other ways to do so... rather than traveling to Ukraine to fight," she also said.
  - The US begins additional training of Ukrainian forces at another of "roughly three" US military installations in Germany, according to the US Defense Department.
- 30 April (Day 66)
  - A ceasefire, conducted by the servicemen of Azov, to allow the evacuation of civilians from Mariupol is announced to start at 6 am local time, but begins at 11 am due to multiple delays. This comes after new Maxar Technologies satellite imagery shows nearly every building at the Azovstal steel plant has been destroyed.
  - Multiple explosions are reported by soon after 6 pm by Ukrainian media and witnesses in Odesa. The attack partially destroyed one of the runways at Odesa's airport. Another witness reported that at least one combat plane flew over the city.
  - President Zelenskyy announces that 69% of de-occupied settlements now have "full-fledged local self-government" again, adding the work of humanitarian offices has already begun in 93% of liberated settlements. Zelenskyy also announces that the Ukrainian army has already destroyed more than 1,000 Russian tanks, nearly 200 Russian aircraft, and almost 2,500 armored fighting vehicles.
  - Efforts by Russian forces to increase Russian over Ukrainian identity take place. In Tommak, the coat of arms of Ukraine is removed from outside of the mayor's office, Russian supermarket chain MERA replaces the existing Ukrainian one in Melitopol, and a statue of former Soviet leader Vladimir Lenin is re-erected in Nova Kakhovka, according to Deputy PM Mykhailo Fedorov.
  - Kherson's overthrown mayor, Ihor Kolykhaiev, has said that he doesn't believe the change from hryvnia to roble will be possible, seeing as the only working banking system in the region uses hryvnia.
  - A newly released Russian video shows a submarine in the Black Sea launching cruise missile attacks on Ukraine, confirming earlier Ukrainian military claims.

=== May ===
- 1 May (Day 67)
  - President Zelenskyy announces for the first time that civilians, around 100, were evacuated from the Azovstal steel plant in a "real ceasefire" from the heavy Russian bombardment of the plant. There are still around one hundred people still in the plant, many of whom are injured, and are still trapped without basic necessities, according to President Zelenskyy in an address. The evacuations stop early due to a break in the ceasefire, but are set to continue tomorrow at 8 am.
  - US House Speaker Nancy Pelosi visits Kyiv, meeting with many Ukrainian diplomats. Ukrainian ambassador to the US Oksana Markarova commented the visit was "symbolic," and that Ukraine looks forward to the approval of the $33 billion supplemental funding bill aimed at supporting Ukraine over the next several months.
  - It is "only a question of how soon that will be feasible" before US president Biden visits Ukraine, announces US House Intelligence Chairman Adam Schiff.
  - Three people are killed and eight others injured in Russian shelling near Izium in the Kharkiv region where Russian forces are attempting to advance against Ukrainian forces in the settlements of Uda, Prudianka, and Staryi Saltiv, according to head of the Regional Military Administration Oleh Synyehubov.
  - Four residents in Lyman are killed and 11 more wounded in by Russian shelling, according to Donetsk Regional Military Administration head Pavlo Kyriyenko.
  - Foreign Minister Dmytro Kuleba tells top EU diplomat Josep Borrell that "the next round of EU sanctions on Russia which must include an oil embargo," otherwise the west is doing nothing more than "supporting Ukraine with one hand while supporting the Russian war machine with another hand".
- 31 May (Day 97)
  - US President Biden announces the US will send an 11th package weapons package to Ukraine, including "more advanced rocket systems and munitions" such as the High Mobility Artillery Rocket System (HMARS) which will help guide "more precise [strikes on] key targets". NATO announces they do not foresee Russia retailing to this decision.
  - Russian forces shell 21 areas in Luhansk and Donetsk, destroying 46 "civil objects," according to the Joint Forces Task Force.

=== June ===
- 1 June (Day 98)
  - Fighting continues for the control of Severodonetsk, though it is announced that 80% of the territory is now controlled by Russian forces, according to head of Luhansk's regional military administration Serhiy Hayday.
  - Ukraine beats Scotland 3–1 at Hampden Park in Glasgow in the 2022 FIFA World Cup playoff semi-final. The result leaves team Ukraine one win away from officially qualifying for the upcoming World Cup in Qatar. The match was originally due to take place on 24 March, but was postponed because of the Russian invasion.
  - Russian cruise missiles hit a railway station for a second time close to the Beskydy Tunnel in the Carpathian mountains, injuring two people. According to an Interior Minister advisor Anton Gerashchenko, the strike was carried out to "disrupt rail traffic and stop the supply of fuel and weapons from our allies".
  - Ukraine announces that at least 7 people have been killed and 16 injured today, primarily in the cities of Severodonetsk and Sloviansk, according to a statement from the national Joint Forces Task Force.
  - The United Kingdom agrees to send more M270 Multiple Launch Rocket Systems to the Ukrainian military and training on how to use the system, according to British Defence Secretary Ben Wallace.
- 2 June (Day 99)
  - "Some success" is reported in the fight for control of Severodonetsk that Ukrainian forces are keeping their ground, and that street fighting still continues, according to President Zelenskyy in a video message.
  - The armed forces including the AZOV Dnipro unit launch an offensive from several vantage points into Russian occupied areas in the Kherson region. Head of the Kherson Regional State Administration Gennady Laguta proudly announces the liberation of 20 settlements in around 8 km (5 miles) of Russian occupied territory.
  - The cities of Bakhmut and Slovyansk and the highways connecting to them are the main areas under bombardment from Russian forces according to head of the Donetsk military administration Pavlo Kyrylenko.
  - Around 22 million tons of grain are reported to be stuck in ports due to lack of Russian cooperation causing major grain insecurity issues in Asia and Africa. Russia has also been caught stealing and illegally selling Ukrainian grain to third parties in other nations.
  - The US confirms it has carried out a handful successful cyber operations in support of Ukraine in "offensive" and 'defensive" ways.
- 3 June (Day 100)
  - President Zelenskyy with PM Shmyhal and his adviser Mykhailo Podolyak, reaffirms that Ukraine will win the war in a somber and defiant video marking the 100th day of war in the nation. "We have been defending our country for 100 days already. Victory will be ours! Glory to Ukraine!" Zelenskyy said.
  - The Red Cross reports that the scale of the destruction in just 100 days of war "defies comprehension". ICRC Director-General Robert Mardini also citing that "one third of the population" has had to flee in this small period of time.
  - The EU formally adopts a sixth package of sanctions against Russia over its aggression in Ukraine. The sanctions will apply to Russian oil, bank payment systems "de-SWIFT-ing," broadcasting, general exports, consulting services, and individual listings.
  - Officials announce that the Ukrainian military is "continu[ing] to prepare" for an anticipated Russian offensive toward Kharkiv.
  - Russian president Putin and Senegalese president Macky Sall discuss the ongoing food and grain crisis caused by the Russian serizing of Ukrainian grain, as well as economic and humanitarian cooperation in a meeting in Sochi, Russia, according to the Kremlin.
- 4 June (Day 101)
  - The All Saints church in Sviatohirsk, whose original temple dates back to the year 1526, is the most recent of 113 churches to be "destroyed" by Russian artillery, according to Zelenskyy.
  - Hundreds more people flee Sloviansk and Severodonetsk as the Russian army is "throwing all its reserves into" the capturing of the cities, with more reinforcements arriving, according to the Luhansk regional military administration.
  - Heavy fighting continues in the east, with Russian air activity in the region "remaining high," but has "failed to have a meaningful impact on the conflict" as of recently according to the UK Ministry of Defence.
  - Foreign Minister Kuleba reacts angrily to French President Macron's comment that "we must not humiliate Russia". Kuleba said in response that it is "Russia that humiliates itself. We all better focus on how to put Russia in its place. This will bring peace and save lives".
  - Defense Minister Oleksii Reznikov, speaking at the GLOBSEC-2022 forum in Bratislava in Slovakia, says it is "hard to predict when the war will end, but my optimistic projection is that it may end by the end of the year".
- 5 June (Day 102)
  - Zelenskyy visits troops on the frontline border of the Luhansk-Donetsk regions, specifically "Lysychansk" and "Soledar," Zelenskyy said in his nightly address. "I am proud of everyone I met, shook hands with, communicated with and supported," Zelenskyy also said.
  - Head of the Luhansk region military administration Hayday announces the "good news" that "half of the city (of Severodonetsk) is really controlled by our defenders," which is a major advance compared to early in the week, with Russians controlling 80% of the city.
  - No territory was regarded as lost, but it is reported Russian forces resumed their offensive near Sviatohirsk, suffering losses.
  - Russians forces conducted an offensive in Bila Krynytsia which was recently retaken by Ukrainian forces. Head of the regional military administration Oleksandr Vilkul said Russian units had returned to "previously occupied positions".
  - Wales defeats Ukraine 1–0 to secure a slot in the 2022 FIFA World Cup. As a gesture of generosity, 100 tickets were handed out to Ukrainian refugees living in the area before the beginning of the match.

=== September ===
- 18 September – 2022 Russian and Ukrainian tornado outbreak: A small but significant tornado outbreak took place in Eastern Ukraine and eventually moved into Russia the following day, producing at least 5 tornadoes including an F3 tornado.
- 19 September – The public chambers of the Donetsk People's Republic and Luhansk People's Republic appealed to their heads of state with a request to "immediately" hold a referendum on joining Russia.
- 20 September – The People's Council of the Luhansk People's Republic scheduled a referendum on the republic's entry into Russia as a federal subject for 23–27 September. Soon after, the People's Council of the Donetsk People's Republic announced that the referendum on the entry of the DPR into the Russian Federation would be held on the same date.
- 27 September – 2022 annexation referendums in Russian-occupied Ukraine: According to the results released by Russian occupation authorities in Ukraine, the Donetsk People's Republic, the Luhansk People's Republic, as well as occupied parts of Zaporizhzhia and Kherson Oblasts overwhelmingly vote in favor of annexation, with 99.23%, 98.42%, 93.11% and 87.05% of support, respectively. Turnout exceeded 75% in each region and exceeded 97% in Donetsk Oblast. However, the voting has been widely dismissed as a sham referendum.
- 30 September – Russian president Vladimir Putin announced in a speech that Russia had annexed the four regions occupied during the conflict.

=== December ===
- 2 December – Ukrainian president Volodymyr Zelenskyy entered a bill to the Verkhovna Rada that would officially ban all activities of the Ukrainian Orthodox Church (Moscow Patriarchate) UOC in Ukraine.

== Deaths ==
- 14 January - Leonid Derkach, 82, politician, intelligence officer and general
- 27 January - Pavlo Kuznietsov, 71, former member of the Verkhovna Rada (1998–2002), Communist Party of Ukraine
- 28 January - Vladimir Virchis, 48, boxer
- 15 February – Lidiya Belozyorova, 76, actress
- 22 February - Ivan Dziuba, 90, literacy critic, dissident, Hero of Ukraine, academic
- 3 March – Maj Gen Andrei Sukhovetsky, 47, Russian deputy commander, Ukrainian sniper
- 7 March - Oleksandr Marchenko (politician), 57, former member of the Verkhovna Rada (Svoboda)
- 10 March - Yevhen Deidei, 34, former member of the Verkhovna Rada (People's Front (Ukraine)), and deputy leader of Special Tasks Patrol Police Kyiv-1
- 14 March - Mykola Kravchenko, 38, politician, historian, founder of the Azov Battalion
- 15 March – Maj Gen Oleg Mityaev, 47 or 48, commander of Russia's 150th motorised rifle division, Azov regiment
- 17 March - Oksana Shvets, 67, actress
- 18 March - Borys Romanchenko, 96, Holocaust survivor
- 27 March - Oleksandr Rzhavskyy, 63, former member of the Verkhovna Rada and candidate for President of Ukraine in 2004
- 29 March – Denis Kurilo, unknown age, commander of Russia's 200th separate motorized rifle brigade, Ukrainian forces
- 8 April – Colonel Alexander Bespalov, unknown age, commander of Russia's 59th Guards Tank Regiment, Ukrainian forces
- 11 April – Vladimir Petrovich Frolov, 55, deputy commander of Russia's 8th army, Ukrainian forces
- 9 May - Davyd Zhvania, 54, former emergency minister of Ukraine and former member of the Verkhovna Rada (Party of Regions)
- 9 June - Roman Ratushnyi, 24, Euromaidan activist, journalist and soldier
- 31 July - Oleksiy Vadaturskyi, 74, businessman and the founder of Nibulon, the largest grain logistic company in Ukraine
- 29 October - Lyudmyla Milyayeva, 96, art historian and university teacher

== See also ==
- Timeline of the Russian invasion of Ukraine
- Outline of the Russo-Ukrainian War
