= Serhiy Hamaliy =

Ukrainian politician

- Сергій Гамалій
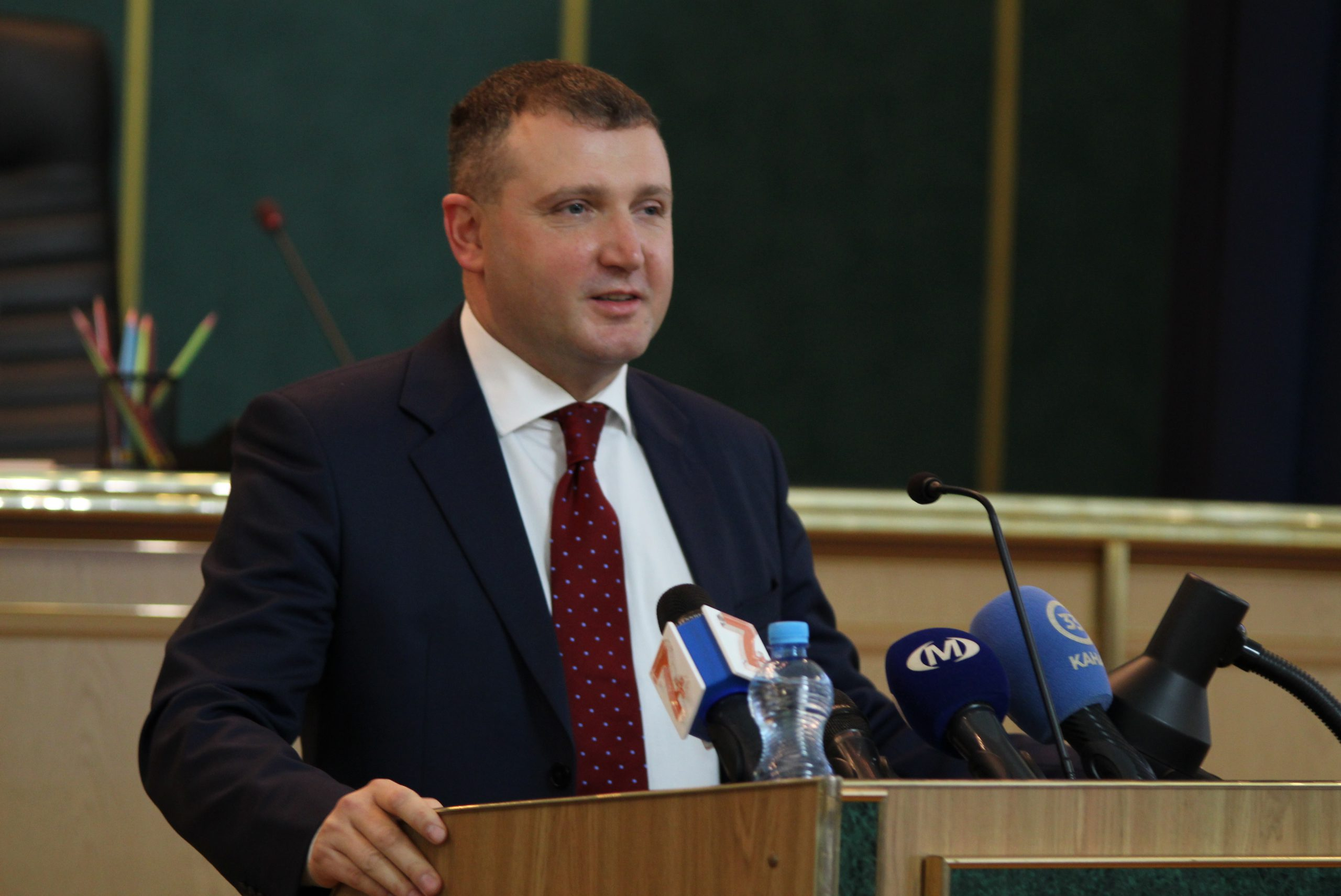

Governor of Khmelnytskyi Oblast
- In office 3 December 2020 – 15 March 2023
- Preceded by: Roman Prymush (acting)
- Succeeded by: Serhii Tiurin (acting)

Personal details
- Born: Serhiy Vyacheslavovych Hamaliy; 26 March 1979 (age 47) Kamianets-Podilskyi, Ukraine, Soviet Union
- Party: Independent

Serhiy Vyacheslavovych Hamaliy (Ukrainian: Сергій В'ячеславович Гамалій; born on 26 March 1979) is a Ukrainian statesman and entrepreneur and former Governor of Khmelnytskyi Oblast from December 2020 to March 2023.

== Biography ==
Serhiy Hamaliy was born on 26 March 1979 in Kamianets-Podilskyi, Khmelnytskyi Oblast, Ukraine.

In 1999, he moved to Poland, where he graduated from the economic school in Warsaw.

He graduated from the historical and legal lyceum and later studied at the Khmelnytskyi University of Management and Law, which he did not graduate from, and transferred to the Yuriy Fedkovich Chernivtsi National University with a degree in law. In 2003, he graduated from the Podolsk State Agrarian and Technical Academy with a degree in economics and accounting.

From 2004 to 2009, he was an assistant to a deputy of the Kamenets-Podolsky city council on a voluntary basis.

From 2005 to 2007, he worked as a legal adviser at the Warsaw Institute of Food Engineering.

Since 2007, he has been an entrepreneur, engaged in the restaurant business and logistics. In particular, he is the owner of the company "Delitsiya", which is engaged in the restaurant business, and also provides mobile catering services.» He is an independent, and did not work in state structures.

== Governor of Khmelnytskyi Oblast ==
On 18 November 2020, the Cabinet of Ministers of Ukraine approved the dismissal of Dmytro Habinet as Governor of Khmelnytskyi Oblast and supported Hamaliy's appointment to that position.

On 24 November 2020, President Volodymyr Zelenskyy signed a decree on the dismissal of Habinet administration in accordance with the application submitted by him. By another decree, Roman Prymush, who worked as the first deputy head of the Khmelnytskyi Regional State Administration since January 2020, was entrusted with the temporary performance of the duties as acting governor.

On 3 December 2020, by decree of President Zelenskyy, Hamaliy was appointed Governor of Khmelnytskyi Oblast.

Hamaliy was dismissed as Governor by Presidential decree on 15 March 2023.

== Family ==
He is married to his wife, Viktoriya Oleksandrivna Hamaily and has three children, daughter Domynyka, and sons Vyacheslav and Zakhary.

According to the declaration for 2019, he owns two apartments and a house in Poland.
