= Ozyorsk =

Ozyorsk (Russian: Озёрск) or Ozersk (Озерск) is the name of several inhabited localities in Russia.

Urban localities

- Ozyorsk, Chelyabinsk Oblast, a town in Chelyabinsk Oblast
- Ozyorsk, Kaliningrad Oblast, a town in Ozyorsky District of Kaliningrad Oblast

Rural localities

- Ozersk, Samara Oblast, a settlement in Bolsheglushitsky District of Samara Oblast
