= Viktor Kotsemyr =

Ukrainian politician (1952–2025)

- Віктор Коцемир

Governor of Khmelnytskyi Oblast
- In office 12 July 2004 – 21 January 2005
- Preceded by: Viktor Lundyshev
- Succeeded by: Vitaliy Oluiko

Governor of Vinnytsia Oblast
- In office May 2002 – June 2004
- Preceded by: Yurii Ivanov
- Succeeded by: Hryhorii Kaletnik

Personal details
- Born: Viktor Frantsovych Kotsemyr; 10 August 1952 Moroziv, Khmelnytskyi Oblast, Ukrainian SSR, USSR
- Died: 15 December 2025 (aged 73)
- Party: Party of Regions
- Education: Khmelnytskyi National University (CS)
- Occupation: Engineer

Viktor Frantsovych Kotsemyr (Ukrainian: Ві́ктор Фра́нцович Коцеми́р; 10 August 1952 – 15 December 2025) was a Ukrainian politician. A member of the Party of Regions, he served as governor of Vinnytsia Oblast from 2002 to 2004 and governor of Khmelnytskyi Oblast from 2004 to 2005.

Kotsemyr died on 15 December 2025, at the age of 73.
