= Ruslan Stefanchuk =

Ukrainian politician (born 1975)

- Руслан Стефанчук
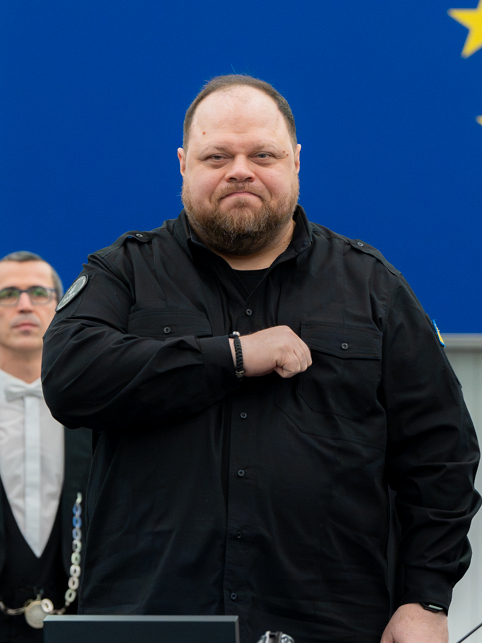
- Stefanchuk in 2025

Chairman of the Verkhovna Rada
- Incumbent
- Assumed office 8 October 2021
- President: Volodymyr Zelenskyy
- Preceded by: Dmytro Razumkov

First Deputy Chairman of the Verkhovna Rada
- In office 29 August 2019 – 8 October 2021
- Chairman: Dmytro Razumkov
- Preceded by: Iryna Herashchenko
- Succeeded by: Oleksandr Kornienko

Representative of the President to the Verkhovna Rada
- In office 21 May 2019 – 7 October 2021
- Preceded by: Iryna Lutsenko
- Succeeded by: Fedir Venislavskyi

Personal details
- Born: 29 October 1975 (age 50) Ternopil, Soviet Union
- Party: Servant of the People
- Education: Khmelnytskyi Institute of Regional Administration and Law; Khmelnytskyi National University

Ruslan Oleksiyovych Stefanchuk (Note: In this name that follows East Slavic naming customs, the patronymic is Oleksiyovych and the family name is Stefanchuk.) (Ukrainian: Руслан Олексійович Стефанчук; born 29 October 1975) is a Ukrainian politician and lawyer serving as the chairman of the Verkhovna Rada since October 2021.

Stefanchuk was touted as the ideologue of Volodymyr Zelenskyy's election campaign in the 2019 Ukrainian presidential election. He was elected to the Ukrainian parliament as a member of the Servant of the People party (placed 2nd on the party list) in the 2019 Ukrainian parliamentary election.

Stefanchuk is one of the authors of Ukrainian President Volodymyr Zelenskyy's 2019 election program. He was also the Representative of the President of Ukraine Zelenskyy at the Verkhovna Rada (Ukraine's national parliament) from 21 May 2019 until 7 October 2021, and is a chairman of the Verkhovna Rada since then.

== Early life and education ==
Ruslan Stefanchuk was born on 29 October 1975 in Ternopil in a family of medics.

He graduated with honors from the Khmelnytskyi School No. 18 in 1992. Then he received a law degree from the Khmelnytskyi University of Management and Law in 1997 and then studied Production management at the Khmelnytskyi National University, graduating in 1999.

Until 2019 Stefanchuk was engaged in educational, scientific and legal activities. He worked at the Khmelnytskyi University of Management and Law, the Institute of Legislation of the Verkhovna Rada of Ukraine, the National Academy of the Prosecutor's Office of Ukraine, and the Higher School of Advocacy. He was the Deputy Chief Editor of the Law Magazine "Law of Ukraine" and worked as an Assistant of Member of Verkhovna Rada Anatoliy Matviyenko from 2007 to 2012.

== Political career ==
Stefanchuk is a corresponding member of the National Academy of Legal Sciences of Ukraine. Honored Worker of Science and Technology of Ukraine (2017).

Zelenskyy won the election, in the second round of the election he defeated incumbent president Petro Poroshenko with nearly 73% of the vote to Poroshenko's 25%.

In the 2019 Ukrainian parliamentary election, Stefanchuk was elected into parliament (placed 2nd on the party list) Servant of the People party. His brother Mykola Stefanchuk was (in the same election) elected for the same party in the single-mandate constituency 187 (located in Khmelnytskyi Oblast). (Note: Mykola Stefanchuk won single-mandate constituency 187 (located in Khmelnytskyi Oblast) for Servant of the People with 35.83% of the votes. Runner up Vitalii Didenko from Svoboda gained 29.44%.) In total Servant of the People won 124 seats on the nationwide party list and 130 constituency seats.

On 29 August 2019, Stefanchuk was elected First Deputy Chair of the Verkhovna Rada.

=== As a chairman of the Verkhovna Rada ===
On 7 October 2021, the Verkhovna Rada voted to dismiss Dmytro Razumkov from his post as chairman of the parliament. The following day Stefanchuk was elected chairman of the parliament with 261 members backing the appointment. On 15 October of the same year, Stefanchuk was appointed as member of the National Security and Defense Council of Ukraine by President Zelenskyy.

On the morning of the Russian invasion of Ukraine on 24 February 2022, Stefanchuk was rushed to the Mariinskyi Palace, amid reports of assassination attempts on Volodymyr Zelenskyy, as his role meant he would have to take command of the country had the president been killed.

Talking about minority rights in the context of the accession of Ukraine to the EU, Stefanchuk said in November 2023 that there was no and could be no "Russian national minority" in Ukraine, and "if this nation does not show respect, but on the contrary - carries out aggression against Ukraine, then its rights should be infringed in this part." This came shortly after Vice-Premier for European and Euro-Atlantic Integration Olha Stefanishyna said that Ukraine had no Russian minority because "Ukrainians may speak Russian, but there is no distinct group of Russian minorities."

In January 2024 Stefanchuk was criticized for order No. 1367, including the requirement for MPs to receive "Foreign Ministry-approved talking points and comments for MPs regarding the implementation of foreign policy" before any trip abroad.

Following what was supposed to be the expiration of President Zelenskyy's mandate under peacetime conditions on 20 May 2024, Stefanchuk has been touted by Russian president Vladimir Putin as Ukraine's head of state, citing the presidential succession. However, Stefanchuk has rejected Putin's claims, citing the legal inability to hold elections under martial law and the Ukrainian Constitution setting the presidential mandate to last until the election of a successor at the end of martial law.

In September 2025 Stefanchuk was criticized for his draft of bill no. 14057, which proposes amendments to the Civil Code, and states that until there is a court ruling, any suggestion that someone is a corrupt official is considered false and therefore subject to refutation.

== Personal life ==
Stefanchuk has two children who are both studying law. Stefanchuk's son is in Ukraine, while his daughter is in Vienna. His daughter knows six languages.

== See also ==
- List of members of the parliament of Ukraine, 2019–

== Notes ==
Political offices
Preceded by Dmytro Razumkov	Chairman of the Verkhovna Rada; 2021–present	Incumbent
