= Vitaliy Oluiko =

Ukrainian politician (born 1961)

Vitaliy Oluiko Віталій Миколайович Олуйко
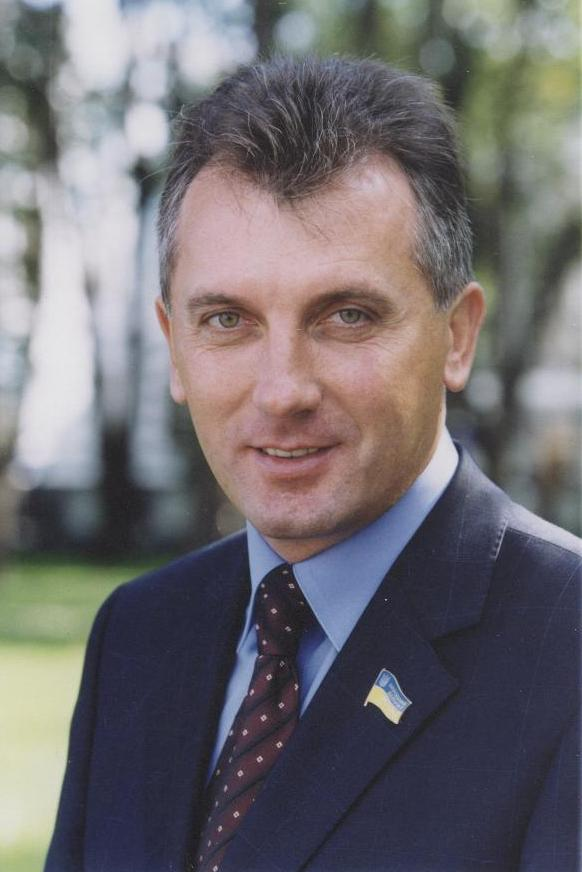
- in 2012

Governor of Khmelnytskyi Oblast
- In office 2005–2005
- Preceded by: Viktor Kotsemyr
- Succeeded by: Ivan Hladunyak

Personal details
- Born: Vitaliy Mykolayovych Oluiko; 2 January 1961 (age 65) Yampil, Bilohiria Raion, Ukrainian SSR
- Party: People's Democratic Party (Ukraine)
- Education: Podilskyi State Agro-Technical University

Vitaliy Mykolayovych Oluiko (Ukrainian: Віталій Миколайович Олуйко; born 2 January 1961, Yampil, Ukraine) is a Ukrainian politician, former member of the Verkhovna Rada (Ukraine's national parliament).

Soon after graduating the university, in 1983-1985 he worked on leading positions at local kolkhoz in Yampil. In 1985-1987 he headed the Komsomol of Ukraine in Bilohiria Raion and in 1987-1991 among the leaders of Khmelnytskyi Oblast. Following the dissolution of the Soviet Union, in 1991-1992 Oluiko headed the coordination council of Podolia Youth League.

In 1992-2000 he worked on leading positions at local government of Khmelnytskyi Oblast.

In 2002-2006 Oluiko was a member of the Verkhovna Rada representing People's Democratic Party within the For United Ukraine! bloc.

While being a parliamentary, in 2005 he served as a Governor of Khmelnytskyi Oblast.

In the 2006 and 2007 Ukrainian parliamentary election Oluiko failed to get reelected to parliament as a candidate of Lytvyn Bloc.

In the 2012 Ukrainian parliamentary election Oluiko failed again to return to parliament as a candidate for Party of Regions in (first-past-the-post) single-member district number 189 located around Krasyliv. He gained second place with 18.62% of the votes, losing to the candidate of Svoboda Ihor Sabii who gained 19.40%.

Oluiko last attempt to return to the national parliament in the 2014 Ukrainian parliamentary election was again unsuccessful as his party Strong Ukraine failed to clear the 5% election threshold (it got 3.11% of the votes) and Oluiko was placed 46th on its national list (the party did win one constituency seat and thus one parliamentary seat).
