= Bolshaya Glushitsa, Samara Oblast =

Rural locality in Samara Oblast, Russia

Coordinates: 52°23′20″N 50°29′22″E

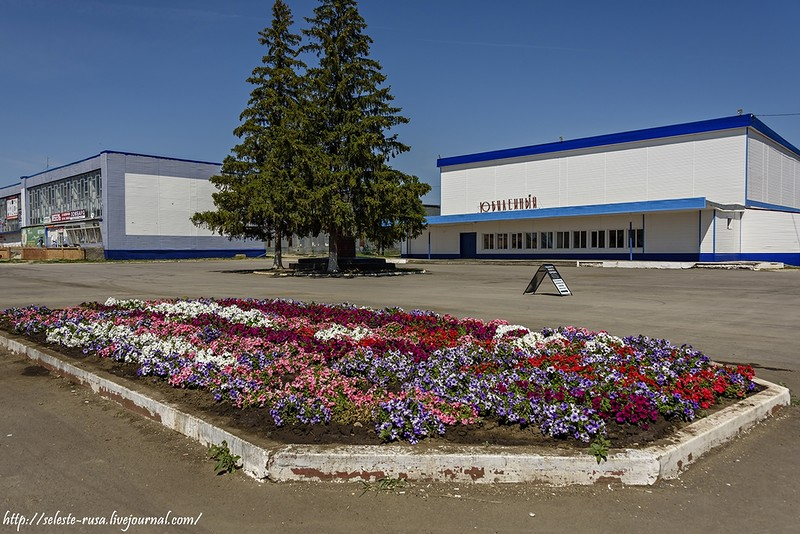

Bolshaya Glushitsa (Russian: Большая Глушица) is a rural locality (a selo) and the administrative center of Bolsheglushitsky District, Samara Oblast, Russia. Population: 9,667 (2010 census); 10,133 (2002 census); 9,883 (1989 Soviet census).
