= Khmelnytskyi University of Management and Law =

Coordinates: 49°25′17″N 26°58′50″E

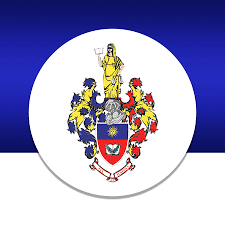
Flag of the university.

The Leonid Yuzkov Khmelnytskyi University of Management and Law (Ukrainian: Хмельницький університет управління та права імені Леоніда Юзькова) is a Ukrainian higher state educational institution, based in Khmelnytskyi, Khmelnytskyi Oblast, Ukraine.

== History ==
It was established September 21, 1992 by decision of the Executive Committee of the Khmelnytskyi City Council of People’s Deputies as the Khmelnytskyi branch of the Odesa Open University. It became independent by resolution of the Cabinet of Ministers of Ukraine on August 4, 1995. In 2019, the Khmelnytskyi Regional Council granted the honorific prefix of Leonid Yuzkov, in honor of the first Chairman of the Constitutional Court of Ukraine.

== Faculties ==
- Faculty of Management and Economics
- Faculty of Law
- Faculty of Public Administration

== Departments ==
- Department of Theory and History of State and Law
- Department of Constitutional, Administrative and Financial Law
- Department of Civil Law and Procedure
- Department of International and European Law
- Department of Labor, Land and Commercial Law
- Department of Criminal Law and Procedure
- Department of Public Management and Administration
- Department of Management, Finance, Banking and Insurance
- Department of Mathematics, Statistics and Information Technologies
- Department of Linguistics
- Department of Philosophy, Social and Humanities and Physical Education

== Heads ==
- Leontii Chornyi (1992 - 1995)
- Vasyl Andrushko (1995 - 2000)
- Vitalii Oluiko (2000 - 2002)
- Leontii Chornyi (2002 - 2006)
- Oleh Omelchuk (since 2009)

== Alumni ==
- Ruslan Stefanchuk, chairman of the Verkhovna Rada since October 2021.
- Mykola Stefanchuk, Deputy of the Verkhovna Rada since 2019.
- Serhii Tiurin, Governor of Khmelnytskyi Oblast since 2023.
