= Serhii Tiurin =

Ukrainian statesman

- Сергій Тюрін
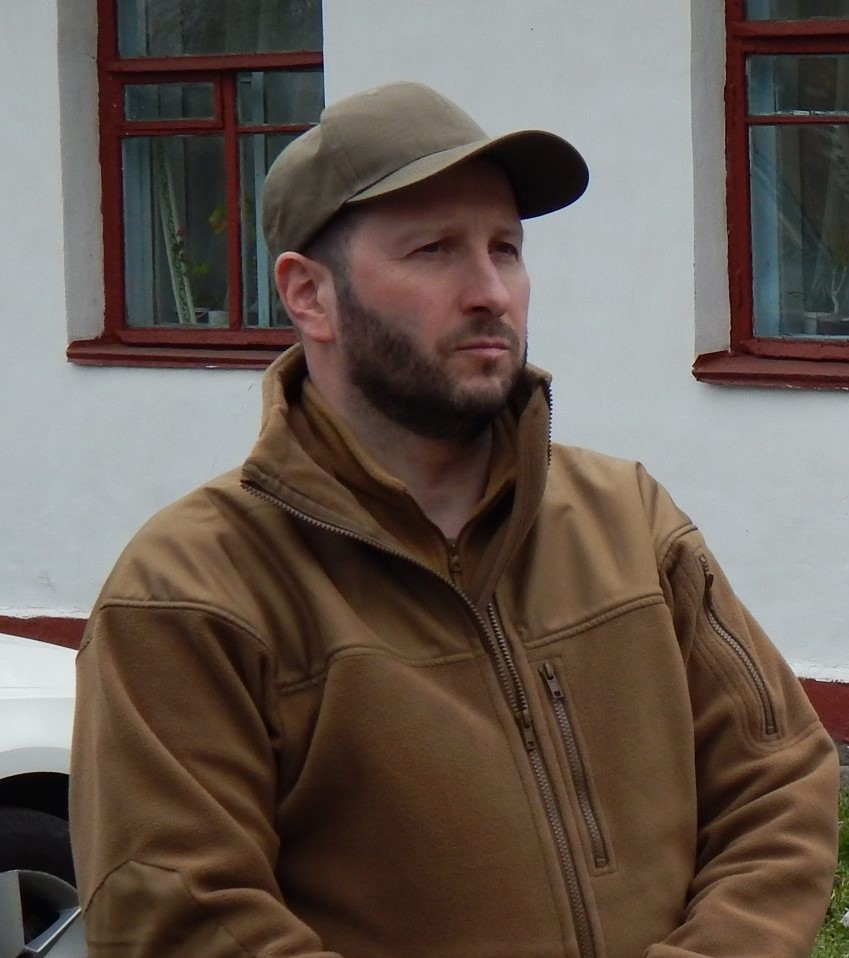
- Tiurin in 2023

Governor of Khmelnytskyi Oblast
- Incumbent
- Assumed office 2 May 2024; Acting: 16 March 2023 – 2 May 2024
- Preceded by: Serhiy Hamaliy

Personal details
- Born: 19 May 1977 (age 49) Soviet Union

Serhii Hryhorovych Tiurin (Ukrainian: Сергій Григорович Тюрін; born 19 May 1977) is a Ukrainian statesman and lawyer who is since 2 May 2024 serving as Governor of Khmelnytskyi Oblast. He was acting Governor since 16 March 2023.

== Biography ==
Tiurin was born on 19 May 1977.

In 2001, Tiurin graduated from the Khmelnytskyi University of Management and Law. While still studying in 2000, he started working as a lawyer at the private small enterprise "M-Invest" in the city of Khmelnytskyi.

From 2002 to 2004, Tiurin worked as a lawyer of the State Reserve Seed Fund of Ukraine.

Since 2004, Tiurin has been practicing law. Until 2008 he was one of the partners of the law firm Hvozdiy and Partners in Kyiv, and from 2008 to January 2021 he worked as a lawyer, partner and executive director of the Kyiv law firm S. T. Partners. At the same time, from December 2019 to January 2021, Tiurin worked as a lawyer and managing partner of the Kyiv legal consulting group of companies Instate Group.

In December 2020, Tiurin received an offer from the head (Governor) of the Khmelnytskyi Oblast Regional State Administration, Serhiy Hamaliy, to become his first deputy, and was officially introduced at a press conference on 10 December 2020. However, he started working in his new position only in January 2021.

On 15 March 2023, Hamaliy was dismissed as Governor in accordance with the submitted application, and Tiurin, due to the absence of other personnel decisions of the president, began to perform the duties of the head of the regional administration.

On 2 May 2024 President Volodymyr Zelenskyy signed the decree that appointed Tiurin Governor (of Khmelnytskyi Oblast).
