= Bolsheglushitsky District =

Bolsheglushitsky District Большеглушицкий район (Russian)
- District
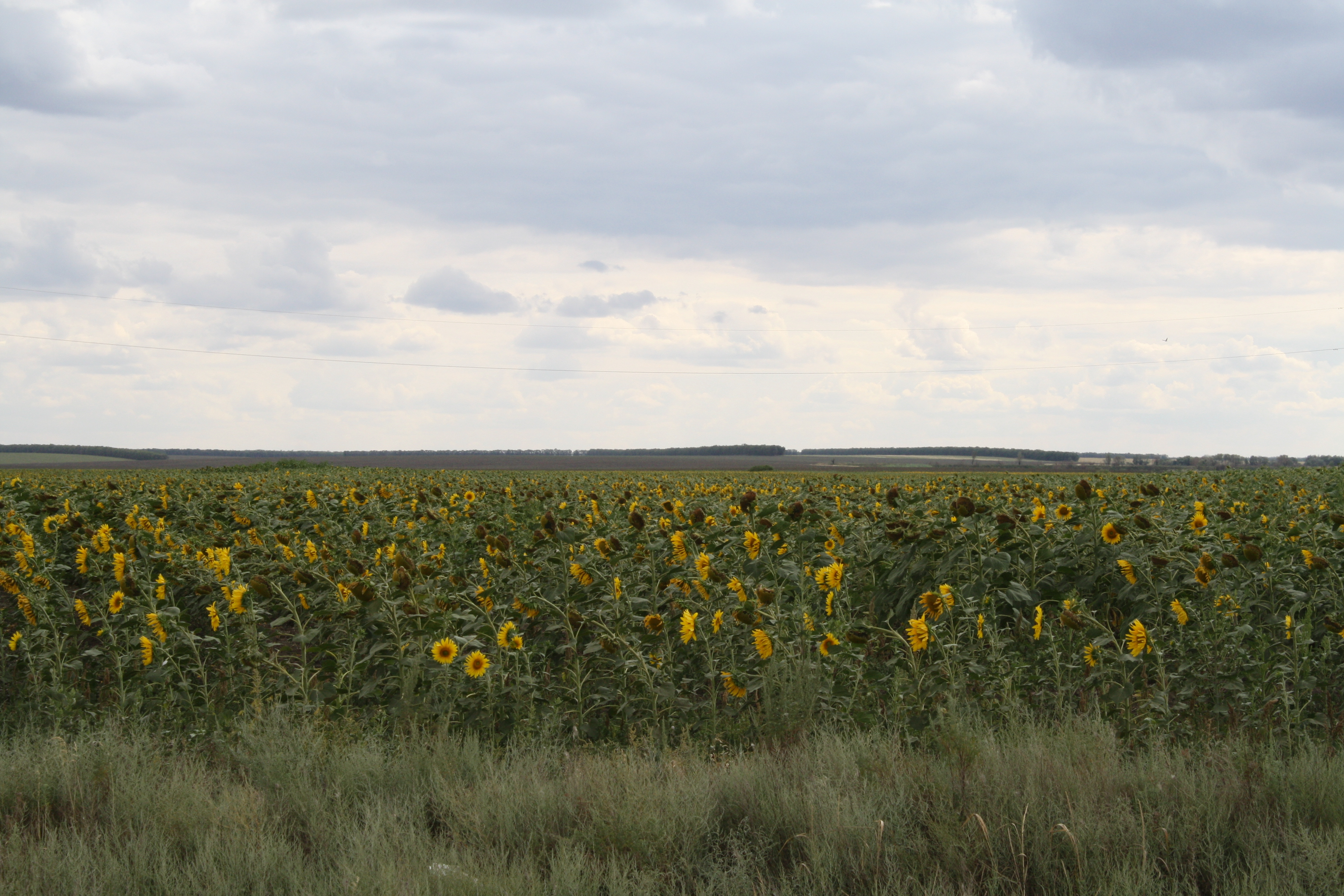
- Sunflower field, Bolsheglushitsky District

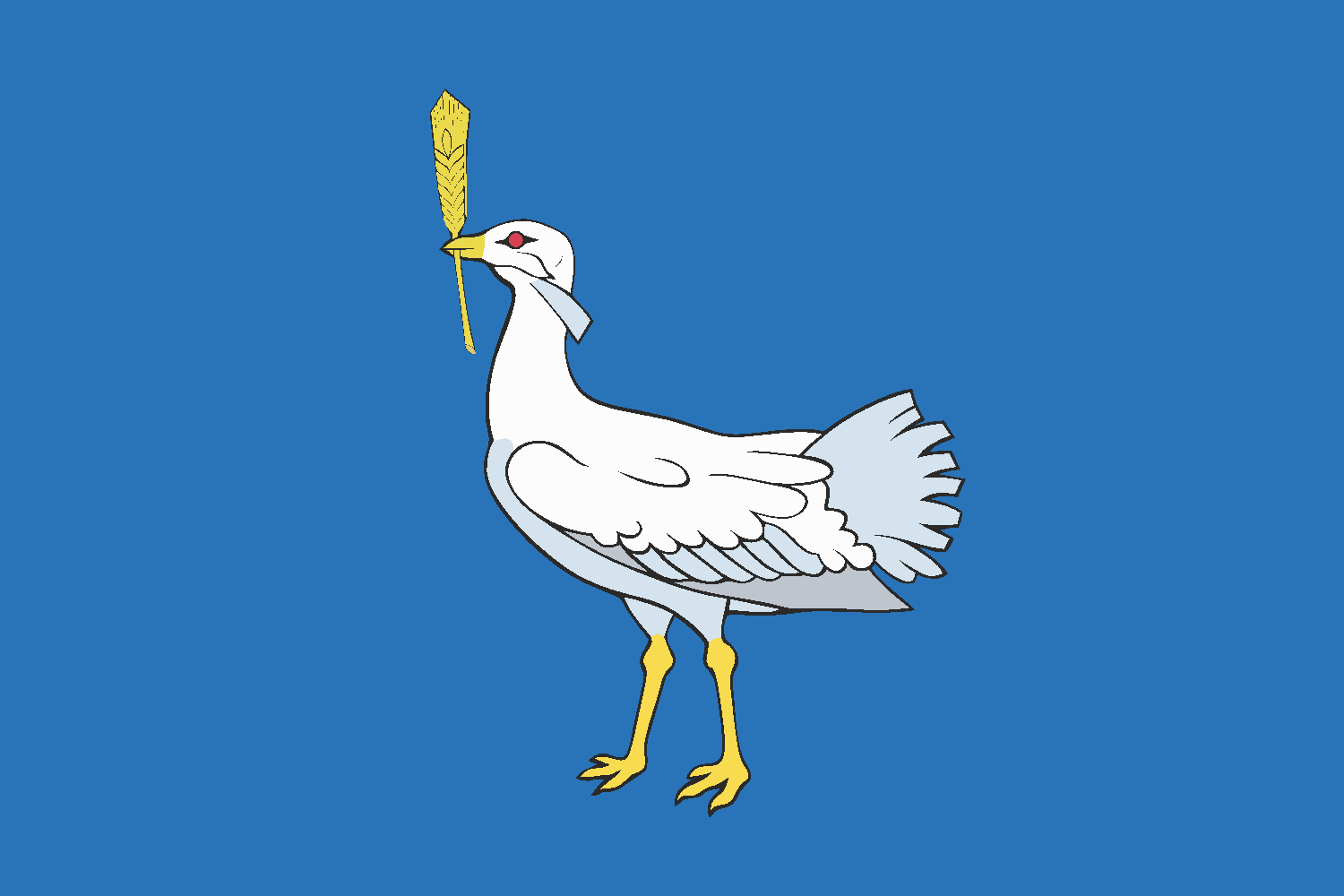
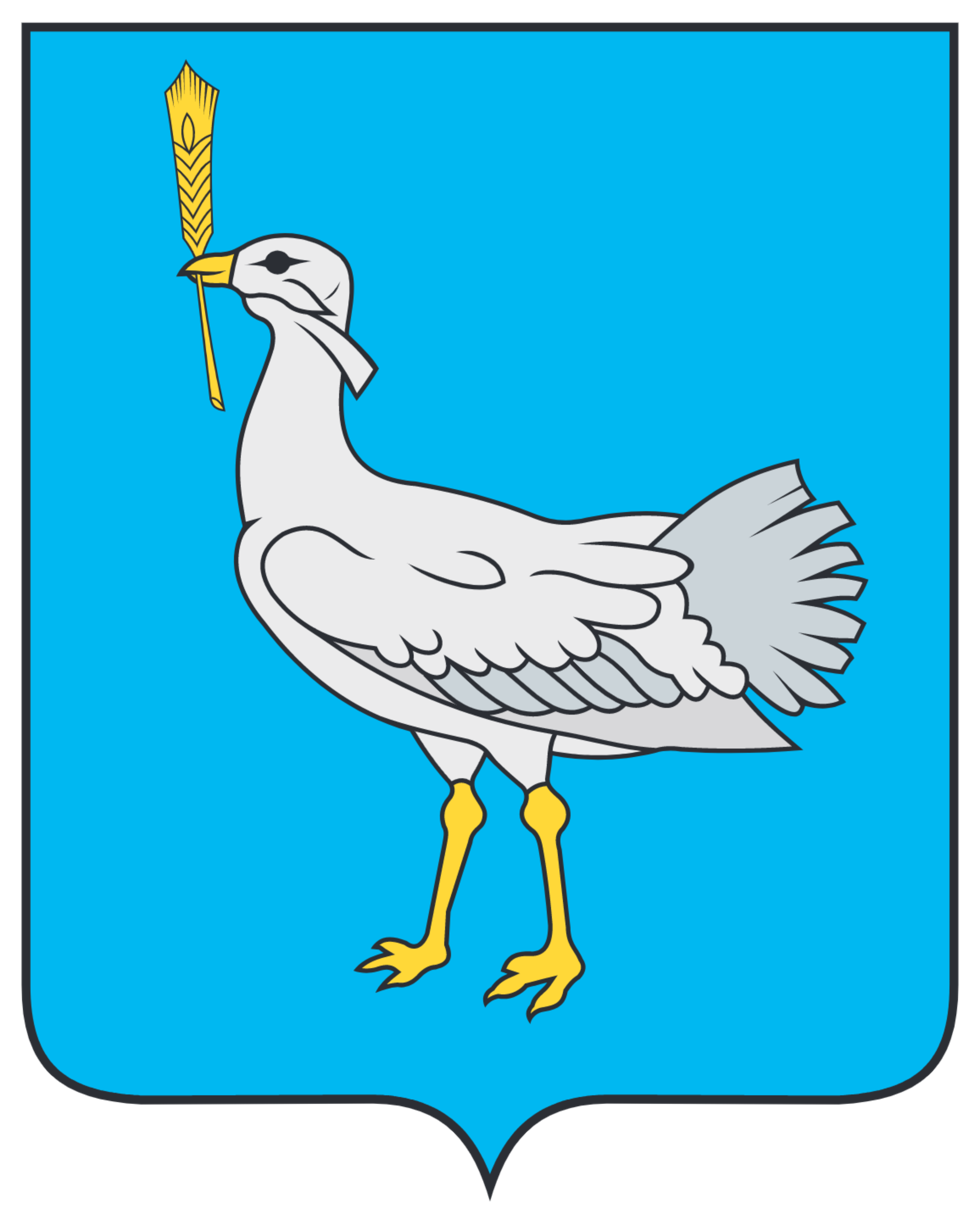
- Flag Coat of arms
- Location of Bolsheglushitsky District in Samara Oblast
- Coordinates: 52°23′17″N 50°28′59″E
- Country: Russia
- Federal subject: Samara Oblast
- Established: 16 July 1928
- Administrative center: Bolshaya Glushitsa

Area
  - Total: 2,534 km^{2} (978 sq mi)

Population (2010 Census)
  - Total: 20,477
  - Density: 8.081/km^{2} (20.93/sq mi)
  - Urban: 0%
  - Rural: 100%

Administrative structure
  - Inhabited localities: 33 rural localities

Municipal structure
  - Municipally incorporated as: Bolsheglushitsky Municipal District
  - Municipal divisions: 0 urban settlements, 8 rural settlements
- Time zone: UTC+4 (MSK+1)
- OKTMO ID: 36608000
- Website: http://bg.samregion.ru/.

Bolsheglushitsky District (Russian: Большеглуши́цкий райо́н) is an administrative and municipal district (raion), one of the twenty-seven in Samara Oblast, Russia. It is located in the south of the oblast. The area of the district is 2,534 square kilometers (978 sq mi). Its administrative center is the rural locality (a selo) of Bolshaya Glushitsa. Population: 20,477 (2010 Census); 21,626 (2002 census); 21,388 (1989 Soviet census). The population of Bolshaya Glushitsa accounts for 47.2% of the district's total population.
