= Pavlo Kuznietsov =

Ukrainian politician (1950–2022)

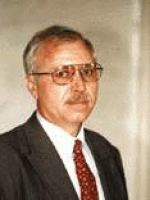

Member of the Verkhovna Rada
- In office 12 May 1998 – 14 May 2002

Personal details
- Born: Pavlo Serhíyovych Kuznietsov; 1 May 1950 Taganrog, Russian SFSR, Soviet Union
- Died: 27 January 2022 (aged 71) Kyiv, Ukraine
- Party: CPSU; KPU
- Education: Southern Federal University

Pavlo Serhíyovych Kuznietsov (Ukrainian: Павло́ Сергі́йович Кузнєцо́в; 1 May 1950 – 27 January 2022) was a Ukrainian-Russian politician. He served as a People's Deputy of Ukraine in the Verkhovna Rada, the parliament of Ukraine, from 1998 to 2002 representing the Communist Party of Ukraine.

== Early life ==
Kuznietsov was bornn on 1 May 1950 in Taganrog, which was then part of the Russian SFSR in the Soviet Union. His father, Serhii, was head of a repair-construction workshop in Taganrog, and was married to Nina Oleksandrivna. In 1972, Kuznietsov graduated from Rostov State University within the Faculty of Economics and Philosophy, granting him the title of economist and lecturer in political economy. He then worked as a lecturer for the Department of Political Economy of Kirov Polytechnic Institute, before returning to work as a postgraduate student at Rostov State University.

In June 1978, he moved to the Ukrainian SSR, and began work as a lecturer within the Department of Political Economy within the Kramatorsk Industrial Institute (now the Donbas State Machine-Building Academy). He worked there until May 1990, and by the time he left he was Head of the Department of Political Economy there.

== Political career ==
In May 1990, he became First Secretary of the Kramatorsk City Committee of the CPU, a position he held until the collapse of the Soviet Union. He then served as head of the laboratory of economics at the association "New Kramatorsk Machinebuilding Factory". From December 1993 to June 1994 he was then Deputy Chairman of the Executive Committee of the Kramatorsk City Council of People's Deputies. A member of the Communist Party of Ukraine, he served in the Verkhovna Rada from 1998 to 2002. From 2002 he served as Deputy Head of the Department for Liaison with State Authorities within the State Tax Administration of Ukraine, and then he became head of it in September 2003.

== Personal life ==
Kuznietsov died of COVID-19 in Kyiv on 27 January 2022, at the age of 71.
