= Dmytro Habinet =

Ukrainian jurist and politician (1982/1983–2024)

Dmytro Anatoliyovich Habinet (Ukrainian: Дмитро Анатолійович Габінет; 9 August 1983 – 17 December 2024) was a Ukrainian jurist and politician. He was governor of Khmelnytskyi Oblast from 2019 to 2020. Habinet died on 17 December 2024, at the age of 41.
