= Borova, Chuhuiv Raion, Kharkiv Oblast =

Village in Kharkiv Oblast, Ukraine

Borova Борова
- Location of Borova Borova (Ukraine)
- Coordinates: 49°47′46″N 36°18′22″E
- Country: Ukraine
- Oblast: Kharkiv Oblast
- Raion: Chuhuiv Raion

Population (2001)
  - Total: 2,419
- Postal code: 63410
- Climate: Cfa

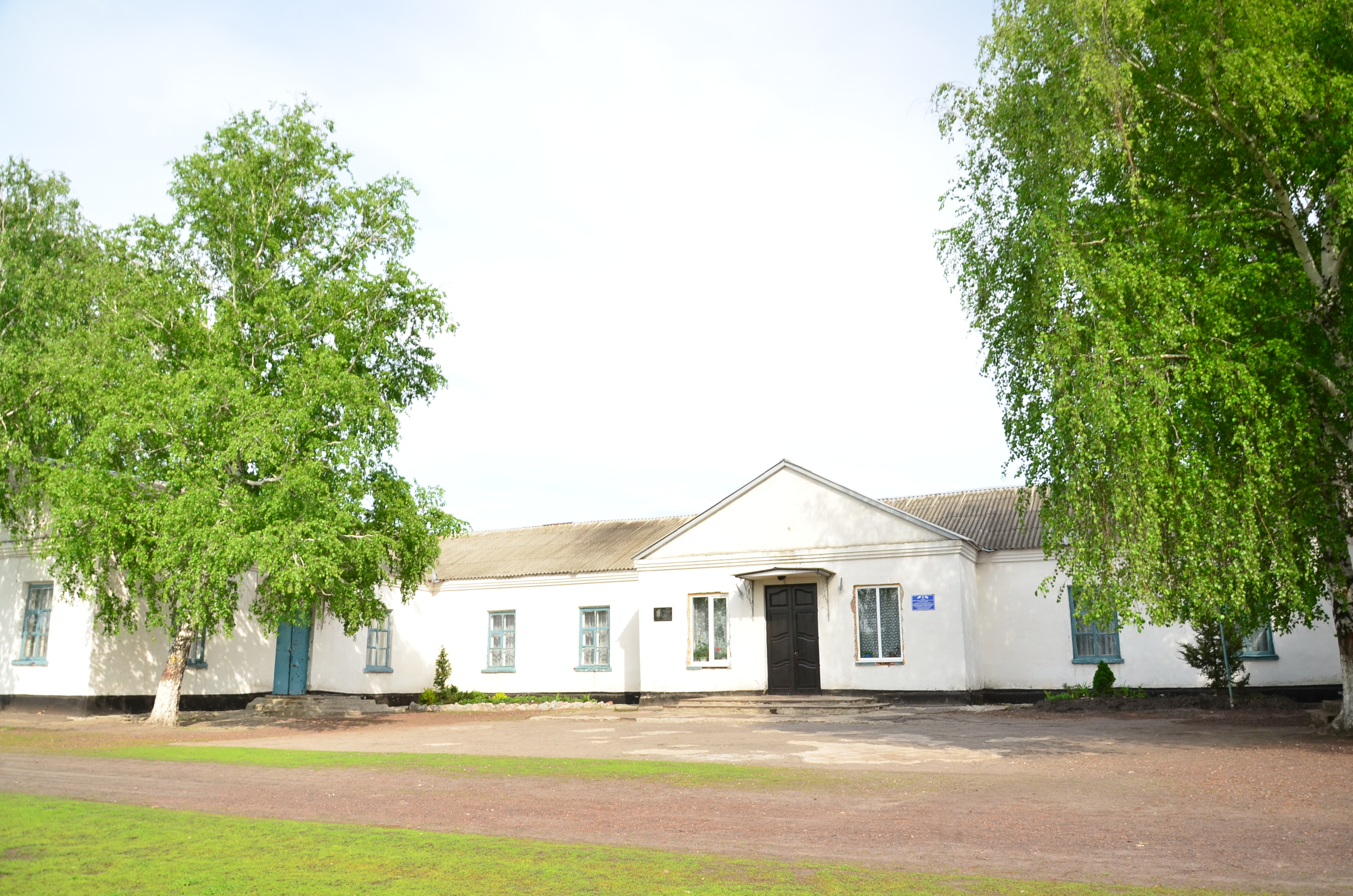
Borova School

Borova (Ukrainian: Борова) is a village in Chuhuiv Raion, Kharkiv Oblast (province) of Ukraine.

Borova was previously located in the Zmiiv Raion. The raion was abolished on 18 July 2020 as part of the administrative reform of Ukraine, which reduced the number of raions of Kharkiv Oblast to seven. The area of Zmiiv Raion was merged into Chuhuiv Raion.
