= Komyshuvakha, Kramatorsk Raion, Donetsk Oblast =

Komyshuvakha Комишуваха
- Rural settlement
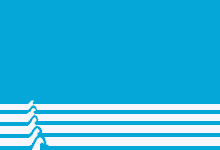
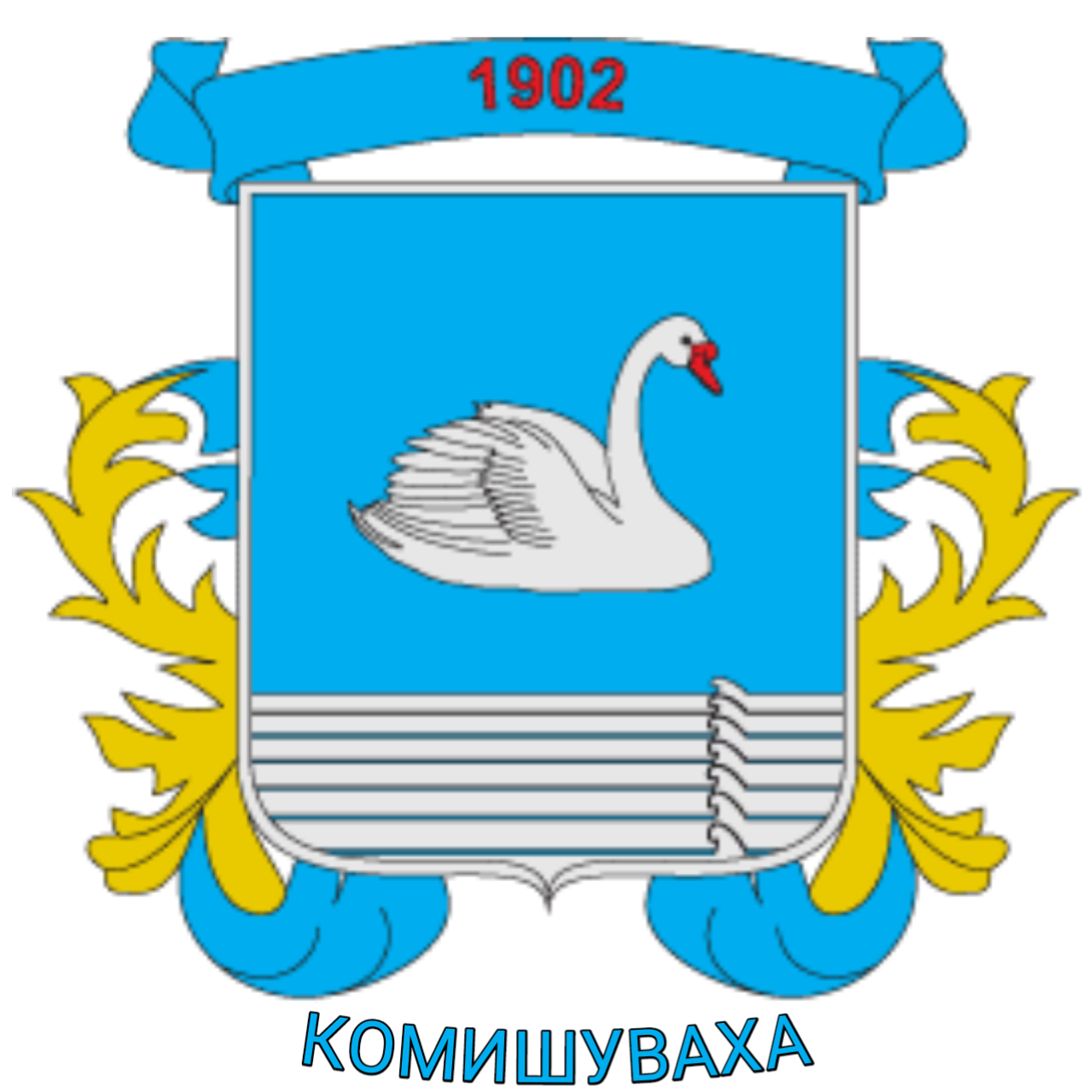
- Flag Coat of arms

- Location of Komyshuvakha Komyshuvakha (Ukraine)
- Coordinates: 48°38′37″N 37°27′16″E
- Country: Ukraine
- Oblast: Donetsk Oblast
- Raion: Kramatorsk Raion
- Elevation: 135 m (443 ft)

Population (2022)
  - Total: 506
- Time zone: UTC+2 (EET)
  - Summer (DST): UTC+3 (EEST)
- Postal code: 84395
- Area code: +380 626

Komyshuvakha (Ukrainian: Комишуваха) is a rural settlement in Kramatorsk Raion, Donetsk Oblast, eastern Ukraine. Population: 506 (2022 estimate).

== Demographics ==
Native language as of the Ukrainian Census of 2001:

- Ukrainian 48.20%
- Russian 43.86%

In 2025, a mandatory evacuation has been announced for the settlement of Komyshuvakha in the Kramatorsk community.
