= Governor of Khmelnytskyi Oblast =

Chief executive of Khmelnytskyi Oblast, Ukraine

- Seal of Khmelnytskyi Oblast

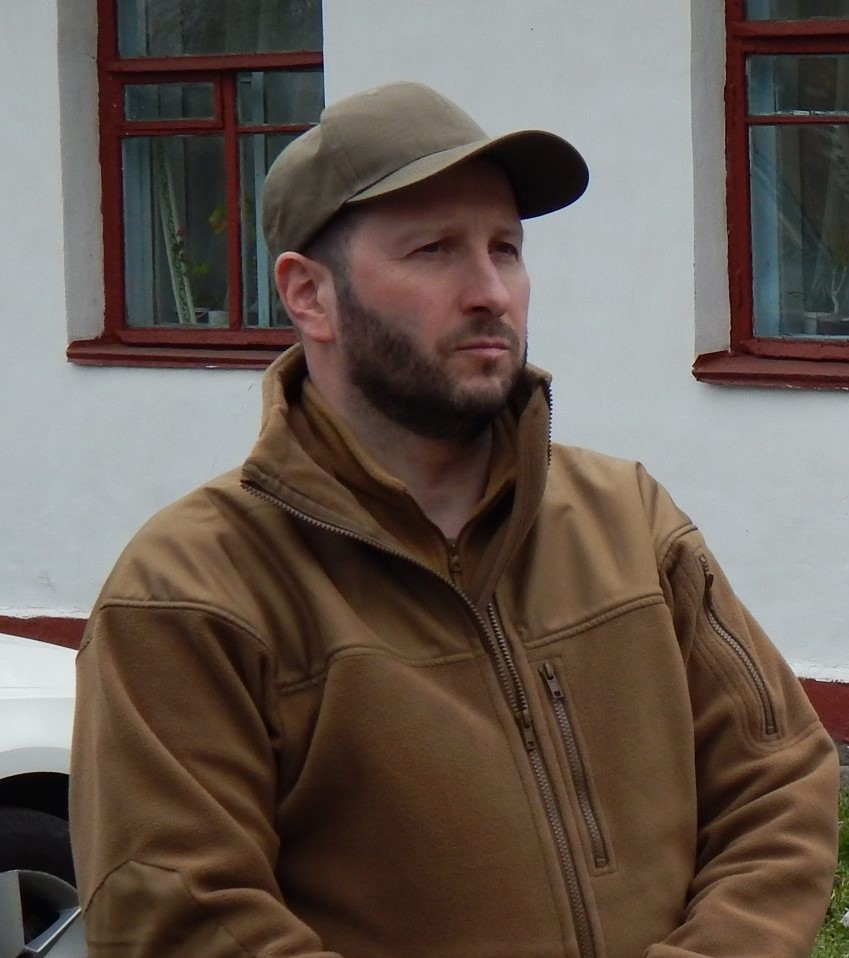
- Incumbent; Serhii Tiurin; Acting since 16 March 2023
- Residence: Khmelnytskyi
- Term length: Four years
- Inaugural holder: Yevhen Huselnykov
- Formation: 1992 as Presidential representative
- Website: Government of Khmelnytskyi Oblast

The governor of Khmelnytskyi Oblast is the head of executive branch for the Khmelnytskyi Oblast.

The office of governor is an appointed position, with officeholders being appointed by the president of Ukraine, on recommendation from the prime minister of Ukraine, to serve a four-year term.

The official residence for the governor is located in Khmelnytskyi. Reception of citizens is held at the following address: Khmelnytskyi, Independence Square, House of Soviets.

== Governors ==
- Yevhen Huselnykov (1992–1994, as the Presidential representative)
- Yevhen Huselnykov (1995–1998, as the Governor)
- Viktor Lundyshev (1998–2004)
- Viktor Kotsemyr (2004–2005)
- Vitaliy Oluiko (2005)
- Ivan Hladunyak (2005–2006)
- Oleksandr Bukhanevych (2006–2007)
- Ivan Havchuk (2007–2010, acting in 2007)
- Vasyl Yadukha (2010–2014)
- Leonid Prus (2014)
- Mykhailo Zahorodniy (2015)
- Oleksandr Korniychuk (2016–2018)
- Vadym Lozovyi (2018-2019)
- Volodymyr Kalnychenko (2019, acting)
- Dmytro Habinet (2019–2020)
- Roman Prymush (2020, acting)
- Serhiy Hamaliy (2020-2023)
- Serhii Tiurin (2023–2024, acting; 2024–incumbent)

== Sources ==
- World Statesmen.org
