= 2023 in Ukraine =

- Decades: 2000s; 2010s; 2020s
- See also: History of Ukraine; List of years in Ukraine

Events in the year 2023 in Ukraine.

== Incumbents ==
- President: Volodymyr Zelenskyy
- Prime Minister: Denys Shmyhal

=== Governors ===
- Cherkasy Oblast: Ihor Taburets (Independent / SN ally)
- Chernihiv Oblast: Vyacheslav Chaus (Independent / SN ally)
- Chernivtsi Oblast: Ruslan Zaparanyuk (Independent / SN ally)
- Dnipropetrovsk Oblast: Valentyn Reznichenko (until January 24, Independent), Serhiy Lysak (starting February 7, Independent / SN ally)
- Donetsk Oblast: Pavlo Kyrylenko (until September 5, Independent), Ihor Moroz (Acting, September 5–December 27, Independent), Vadym Filashkin (starting December 27, Independent / SN ally)
- Ivano-Frankivsk Oblast: Svitlana Onyshchuk (Independent / SN ally)
- Kharkiv Oblast: Oleh Syniehubov (SN)
- Kherson Oblast: Yaroslav Yanushevych (until January 24, Independent), Oleksandr Prokudin (starting February 7, Independent / SN ally)
- Khmelnytskyi Oblast: Serhiy Hamaliy (until March 15, Independent), Serhiy Tyurin (Acting, starting March 15, Independent / SN ally)
- Kirovohrad Oblast: Andriy Raikovych (Independent / SN ally)
- Kyiv Oblast: Oleksiy Kuleba (until January 24, Independent), Dmytro Krikunov (Acting, January 24–April 10, Independent), Ruslan Kravchenko (starting April 10, Independent / SN ally)
- Luhansk Oblast: Serhiy Haidai (until March 15, Independent), Oleksiy Smyrnov (Acting, March 15–April 12, Independent), Artem Lysohor (starting April 12, Independent / SN ally)
- Lviv Oblast: Maksym Kozytskyi (SN)
- Mykolaiv Oblast: Vitaliy Kim (SN)
- Odesa Oblast: Maksym Marchenko (until March 15, Independent), Borys Voloshenkov (Acting, March 15–May 30, Independent), Oleh Kiper (starting May 30, Independent / SN ally)
- Poltava Oblast: Dmytro Lunin (Acting, until October 10, Independent), Philip Pronin (starting October 10, Independent / SN ally)
- Rivne Oblast: Vitaliy Koval (until November 21, SN), Serhiy Podolin (Acting, November 21–December 27, Independent), 淬Oleksandr开放 (starting December 27, Independent / SN ally)
- Sumy Oblast: Dmytro Zhyvytskyi (until January 24, Independent), Taras Savchenko (Acting, January 24–April 12, Independent), Volodymyr Artyukh (starting April 12, Independent / SN ally)
- Ternopil Oblast: Volodymyr Trush (until December 29, SN)
- Vinnytsia Oblast: Serhiy Borzov (SN)
- Volyn Oblast: Yuriy Pohulyayko (Independent / SN ally)
- Zakarpattia Oblast: Viktor Mykyta (Independent / SN ally)
- Zaporizhzhia Oblast: Oleksandr Starukh (until January 24, Independent), Yuriy Malashko (starting February 7, Independent / SN ally)
- Zhytomyr Oblast: Vitaliy Bunechko (Independent / SN ally)

== Ongoing ==
- Russo-Ukrainian War
  - Russian invasion of Ukraine (2022–present)

== Events ==
=== January ===
- 5 January – Following the suggestion of Patriarch Kirill of Moscow, Russian president Vladimir Putin announces a unilateral ceasefire on January 6–7 in connection with Orthodox Christmas. However, Ukraine rejects an offer to respond with a mutual ceasefire, citing lack of trust.
- 10 January – Ukrainian president Volodymyr Zelenskyy denaturalizes pro-Kremlin politician Viktor Medvedchuk and three others for high treason.
- 17 January – Commander-in-Chief of the Armed Forces of Ukraine Valerii Zaluzhnyi and Chairman of the Joint Chiefs of Staff of the United States Mark Milley meet for the first time in person.
- 18 January – 2023 Brovary helicopter crash: Fourteen people are killed and 25 others are injured in a helicopter crash in Brovary, Kyiv Oblast, Ukraine. Interior minister Denys Monastyrsky, deputy minister of internal affairs Yevhen Yenin, and state secretary of internal affairs Yurii Lubkovych are among those killed.
- 24 January –
  - Two British aid workers are killed during a humanitarian evacuation from Soledar in Donetsk Oblast.
  - Several senior Ukrainian officials, including deputy Head of the Office of the President of Ukraine Kyrylo Tymoshenko, four deputy ministers, and five regional governors, resign as a nationwide anti-corruption campaign is launched in Ukraine.
- 25 January – UNESCO places the historic center of Odesa on its list of World Heritage Sites in Danger.

=== February ===
- 5 February – People's Deputy of Ukraine Davyd Arakhamia announces that military intelligence chief Kyrylo Budanov will replace Oleksii Reznikov as Minister of Defense following a corruption scandal.
- 6 February – Major Archbishop Sviatoslav Shevchuk of the Ukrainian Greek Catholic Church announces that the church will begin using the Gregorian calendar on September 1 for all but moveable feasts, following a decision by the Synod of Bishops.
- 8 February – 2023 visit by Volodymyr Zelenskyy to the United Kingdom:
  - Ukrainian president Volodymyr Zelenskyy visits the United Kingdom in his second trip outside Ukraine since the beginning of the Russian invasion, meeting with King Charles III and Prime Minister Rishi Sunak, and addressing Parliament at Westminster Hall.
  - Following his UK visit, Zelenskyy visits France to meet President Emmanuel Macron and German chancellor Olaf Scholz.
- 20 February – 2023 visit by Joe Biden to Ukraine: U.S. president Joe Biden makes an unannounced visit to Kyiv, Ukraine, where he meets with President Volodymyr Zelenskyy.

=== March ===
- 19 March – Russian president Vladimir Putin visits Mariupol, Donetsk Oblast, in Russian-occupied Ukraine, for the first time since the invasion began.

=== April ===
- 5 April – President of Ukraine Volodymyr Zelenskyy makes an official visit to Poland. During his meeting with Polish president Andrzej Duda, Zelenskyy receives the Order of the White Eagle, Poland's highest order.
- 6 April – Deputy leader Andrii Sybiha says that Ukraine is willing to hold talks on the future of Crimea if a Ukrainian counter-offensive reaches the Crimean administrative border.
- 16 April – Ukraine and Russia conduct a prisoner swap for soldiers who fought in Bakhmut, with 130 Ukrainian soldiers returning and an unknown number of Russian soldiers returning.
- 18 April –
  - Former People's Deputy of Ukraine Oleh Barna is killed in combat.
  - The Ukrainian government invites Brazilian president Luiz Inácio Lula da Silva to visit Ukraine and criticizes him for his approach to the Russian invasion. Russian foreign minister Sergei Lavrov welcomes Lula's position on peace efforts.

=== May ===
- 6 May – Russian nationalist writer Zakhar Prilepin is injured and his driver is killed when their vehicle is hit by a car bomb in Nizhny Novgorod Oblast, Russia.
- 13 May – Ukrainian president Volodymyr Zelenskyy meets with Pope Francis during a private audience in the Vatican.
- 14 May – Ukrainian president Volodymyr Zelenskyy meets with German chancellor Olaf Scholz in Berlin, Germany.
- 15 May – Ukrainian president Volodymyr Zelenskyy meets with British prime minister Rishi Sunak at Chequers.
- 16 May – Ukraine officially joins NATO's Cooperative Cyber Defence Centre of Excellence.

=== June ===
- 6 June –
  - The Nova Kakhovka dam in the Russian-occupied part of Ukraine's Kherson Oblast is destroyed, releasing a huge number of water downstream on the Dnieper. The dam had held back 18 cubic kilometres of water in the Kakhovka reservoir.
  - Thousands of civilians are being evacuated from the town of Nova Kakhovka and surrounding villages as the floods spread.
- 12 June – Moldova and Ukraine sign an agreement to build a bridge across their border over the Dniester river between Cosăuți, Moldova, and Yampil, Ukraine, bypassing the unrecognised state of Transnistria.
- 16 June - African leaders led by South African president Cyril Ramaphosa arrive at Kyviv to meet Zelenskyy on a peace mission. The seven leaders are then expected to travel to Moscow to meet Putin.
- 29 June – Former US Vice President Mike Pence makes a surprise visit to Kyiv.

=== July ===
- 21 July – Zelenskyy fires Ukrainian ambassador to the UK, Vadym Prystaiko.
- 28 July – Zelenskyy signs a parliamentary bill to move the date of Ukraine's Christmas Day holiday from 7 January to 25 December, the bill aiming to "abandon the Russian heritage of imposing Christmas celebrations".

=== September ===
- 2 September – A Ukrainian court places billionaire Ihor Kolomoisky under arrest over fraud and money laundering charges as part of corruption related activities.
- 8 September –
  - Tens of thousands of Ukrainians oppose an asset declaration legislation critics believe hampers an effort to hold officials accountable by delaying a requirement to publicly declare their assets.
  - Ukraine’s National Anti-Corruption Bureau freezes more than $80m in assets belonging to Ihor Kolomoisky for 48 hours as part of an embezzlement investigation.

=== October ===
- 27 October – Pro-Russian official Oleg Tsaryov is critically injured in an assassination attempt by unknown assailants in Crimea and is reported to be in intensive care.

=== November ===
- 12 November – Former NATO Secretary General Anders Fogh Rasmussen puts forward a proposal for Ukraine to join the military alliance but without the territories occupied by Russia.
- 27 November – A snowstorm kills at least five people in Ukraine with hundreds of towns and villages losing power. A least ten state highways are also closed with thousands of vehicles stranded in Ukraine amid the severe weather.

=== December ===
- 6 December – Former People's Deputy of Ukraine Illia Kyva, who defected to Russia in March 2022, is found dead in Moscow Oblast.
- 15 December – A councillor throws grenades in a meeting of the village council of Keretsky, killing 1 person and wounding 26 people. The perpetrator is also seriously injured.

== Deaths ==
=== January ===
- 1 January – Bohdan Rebryk, 84, political prisoner and politician, MP (1990–1994).
- 4 January – Volodymyr Radchenko, 74, politician and intelligence officer, vice prime minister (2007), minister of internal affairs (1994–1995) and twice head of the SBU.
- 11 January – Pavlo Naumenko, 57, aerospace engineer.
- 12 January – Valentyna Lutayeva, 66, handball player, Olympic champion (1980).
- 15 January – Ruslan Otverchenko, 33, basketball player (BC Budivelnyk, SC Prometey, national team).
- 15 January – Leonid Barbier, 85, Olympic swimmer (1960).
- 16 January – Inna Bychenkova, 81, theater and film artist, Merited Artist of Ukraine.
- 18 January –
  - Notable Ukrainians killed in the 2023 Brovary helicopter crash:
    - Yurii Lubkovych, 33, diplomat
    - Denys Monastyrsky, 42, politician, minister of internal affairs (since 2021) and MP (2019–2021)
    - Yevhen Yenin, 42, politician, deputy minister of internal affairs (since 2021)
- 19 January – Volodymyr Shcherbyna, 87, mathematician and politician, people's deputy (1990–1994).
- 20 January – Oleh Petrov, 62, politician, MP (1998–2006).
- 26 January – Dmitri Shkidchenko, figure skater and coach.
- 27 January – Isaac Trachtenberg, 99, toxicologist, member of the National Academy of Sciences of Ukraine.
- 29 January –
  - Vadym Dobizha, 81, football manager (Zorya Luhansk, JK Sillamäe Kalev).
  - Dmytro Pavlychko, 93, poet, translator and diplomat, ambassador to Slovakia (1995–1998) and Poland (1999–2002).

=== April ===
- 18 April - Oleh Barna, 55, former member of the Verkhovna Rada (2014–19) (Petro Poroshenko Bloc) and soldier

=== July ===
- 1 July - Victoria Amelina, 37, novelist and war crimes investigator
- 23 July - Kostiantyn Tyshchenko, 81, linguist, teacher and professor

== See also ==
- Outline of the Russo-Ukrainian War
