= 2023 in aviation =

The following aviation-related events occurred in the year 2023.

== Events ==
=== January ===
1 January
The Philippine airspace temporarily closed due to an issue with air traffic control and navigation systems.
2 January
Two helicopters collide near the Sea World theme park in the city of Gold Coast, Queensland, Australia. The collision killed four people and injured eight.
11 January
Thousands of flights are delayed or cancelled in the United States after a Federal Aviation Administration (FAA) NOTAM system outage.
15 January
An ATR 72-500 operating Yeti Airlines Flight 691 from Kathmandu to Pokhara, Nepal, crashes near Pokhara; all 72 people on board are dead.
18 January
A helicopter crashes in Brovary, a suburb of Kyiv, Ukraine, killing Minister of Internal Affairs of Ukraine Denys Monastyrsky, his deputy Yevhen Yenin, and state secretary Yurii Lubkovych and 11 others.
31 January
The 1,574th and final Boeing 747, a 747-8 freighter, is delivered to Atlas Air.
Australian low-cost airline Bonza conducts its maiden flight from the Sunshine Coast to the Whitsundays.

=== February ===
4 February
A Chinese-operated high-altitude weather balloon was shot down by the US Air Force over US territorial waters off the coast of South Carolina. Over the next few days, more balloons are shot down over the US and Canada.
6 February
Mitsubishi Heavy Industries terminates its SpaceJet project and plans to liquidate its Mitsubishi Aircraft Corporation subsidiary.
A Boeing 737-300 of Coulson Aviation crashes while fighting fires in Australia; both pilots survive the crash.
14 February
In one of the largest ever purchases of passenger aircraft, Air India places orders for a total of 470 airliners: 250 from Airbus (210 A320neo family and 40 A350s) and 220 from Boeing (190 737 MAX, 20 787s and 10 777Xs).

=== March ===
2 March
Virgin Atlantic joins the SkyTeam alliance.
12 March
Saudi Crown Prince Mohammed bin Salman formally announces the establishment of Riyadh Air, a new flag carrier airline of Saudi Arabia.

=== April ===
15 April
Estonian startup airline Marabu Airlines makes its first flight, from Munich to Palma de Mallorca.

=== May ===
3 May
Indian airline Go First declares bankruptcy and temporarily ceases operations, citing loss of revenue as a result of Pratt & Whitney engine issues.

11 May
Business jet operator NetJets order up to 250 Embraer Praetor 500s for $5 billion to be delivered from 2025, after having ordered up to 125 Phenom 300 in 2010 and 100 more in 2021.

28 May
China Eastern Airlines conducts the first commercial flight of the Comac C919 from Shanghai to Beijing.

30 May
UK startup Global Airlines announces the purchase of its first aircraft, an Airbus A380. The company claims to be the first new airline in eight years to own an A380.

=== June ===
4 June
A privately operated Cessna 560 Citation V carrying three passengers and a pilot crashes near the George Washington National Forest, Virginia, killing everyone on board. The plane had strayed into restricted airspace; F-16 fighters sent to intercept it observed that the pilot of the plane had passed out.

19–25 June
The Paris Air Show is held. Highlights include:
- Beyond Aero announces a four-seater aircraft with a hydrogen-electric powertrain.
- Aqualines announces an ekranoplan flying boat concept.
- Wright Electric confirms that its electric motor-generator unit has achieved 1 MW of shaft power in testing.
- Aura Aero announces a collaboration with Airbus for its two-seater electric trainer aircraft.
- Leonardo unveils its hydrogen-powered Hybrid Electric Regional Aircraft (HERA).
- ZeroAvia announces an order for 250 hydrogen-electric engines to power Air Cahana's proposed fleet of converted De Havilland Canada Dash 8 turboprops.
- Airbus records a total of 849 firm orders, including 500 A320neo-family aircraft for IndiGo and 250 aircraft (210 A320neo family and 40 A350) for Air India. Boeing records 359 firm orders, including 220 for Air India (190 737 MAX, 20 787s and 10 777Xs). De Havilland Canada, Embraer and ATR record 49, 28 and 24 orders respectively.

28–30 June
Up to 32,000 flights are delayed or cancelled across the United States. Over 1,700 flights, or roughly 1% of all US flights, are cancelled. The disruption was attributed to inclement weather and concerns about the possibility of signal interference from newly adopted 5G wireless technology. Transportation Secretary Pete Buttigieg said that a small portion of the US fleet had not been upgraded to protect against radio interference.

=== July ===
14 July
American low-cost airline New Pacific Airlines commenced operations.

=== August ===
15 August
Irkut Corporation formally rebrands itself as Yakovlev. The Sukhoi Superjet 100 is to be rebranded as the SJ-100, and the Irkut MC-21 also adopts the Yakovlev name.
18 August
A Beechcraft Premier I operated by Malaysian operator Jet Valet crashes onto an expressway near Elmina, Malaysia. Ten people are killed including all eight on board the aircraft and two on the ground. One of the fatalities is Malaysian Federal politician Johari Harun.
23 August
An Embraer Legacy 600 business jet crashes in Russia, killing all three crew members and seven passengers, reportedly including Yevgeny Prigozhin, leader of the Wagner Group.
28 August
The air traffic service in the UK (NATS) experienced significant delays after a technical issue with automated flight plan processing. The fault was triggered at 08:32 by a valid (but unusual) flight plan. At about 12:30 the 4 hour buffer of processed plans expired, and manual processing of flight plans began with reduced capacity. Severe disruption and delays occurred. The problem was subsequently identified as a bug in the handling of identically named but geographically distant waypoints in a single flight plan.

=== September ===
12 September
An Airbus A320 operating Ural Airlines Flight 1383 from Sochi to Omsk makes an emergency landing in a field near Kamenka, Russia, following a hydraulic system failure. All 159 passengers and 6 crew survive.
23 September
An Ilyushin Il-76 military transport crashes whilst attempting to land at Gao International Airport, Mali, killing at least 140 people. Initial reports suggest the aircraft may have been linked to the Russian paramilitary organisation PMC Wagner.

=== October ===
23 October
An Alaska Airlines flight operated by Horizon Air, flying from Seattle Paine Field International Airport to San Francisco, is forced to divert to Portland after an off-duty Alaska Airlines pilot, travelling as a passenger on this flight, attempts to activate the engine fire extinguishers. After the aircraft landed, the passenger was arrested and is facing 83 counts of reckless endangerment and one count of endangering aircraft.

=== November ===
10 November
The Northrop Grumman B-21 Raider stealth bomber makes its first flight from Plant 42 in Palmdale, California.

13–17 November
The Dubai Airshow is held. Highlights include:
- Boeing recorded 259 aircraft orders, whilst Airbus recorded only 66 and ATR 10. Wide-body aircraft accounted for over half of the orders placed.
- Spanish eVTOL developer Crisalion Mobility debuted its Integrity six-seater electric aircraft.
- Archer Aviation announced plans by Air Chateau to purchase 100 of its Midnight eVTOL aircraft.

16 November
A Boeing 787-9 sets a record for the largest aircraft to land in Antarctica. The charter flight, operated by Norse Atlantic Airways on behalf of the Norwegian Polar Institute, flew from Oslo via Cape Town to an ice runway at the Norwegian Troll Research Station.

28 November
A Boeing 787 operated by Virgin Atlantic completes the first transatlantic flight by a commercial airliner using Sustainable Aviation Fuel.

=== December ===
3 December
Alaska Air Group announces a planned acquisition of Hawaiian Airlines for $1.9 billion.

== First flights ==
10 November - Northrop Grumman B-21 Raider

== Ceased operations ==
- 28 January - Flybe
- 31 January - Flyr
- 3 May - Go First
- 2 August - Air Guyane Express
- 31 December - Thai Smile Airways

== Deadliest crash ==
The allegedly deadliest crash of this year involved an Ilyushin Il-76 military transport which overran the runway at Gao International Airport, Mali, on 23 September, reportedly killing up to 140 people. If confirmed, it would be the deadliest crash of 2023.

The confirmed deadliest crash of the year was Yeti Airlines Flight 691, an ATR 72 which crashed on final approach to Pokhara, Nepal, on 15 January, killing all 72 people on board.
