= 2023 in politics =

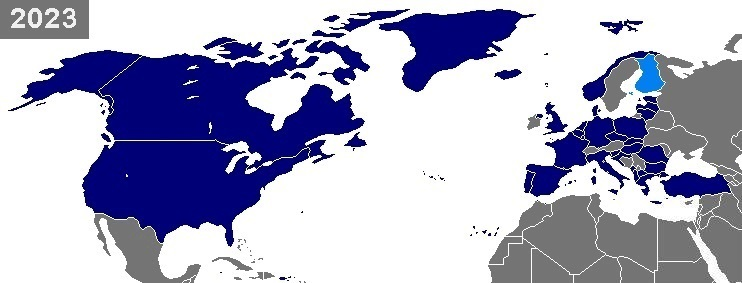
Finland joined the intergovernmental military alliance NATO on April 4, 2023

These are some of the notable events relating to politics in 2023.

== January ==
- January 1
  - All works published in 1927, except for some sound recordings, entered the public domain in the United States.
  - Luiz Inácio Lula da Silva is sworn in as president of Brazil.
- January 3
  - January 2023 Speaker of the United States House of Representatives election: For the first time in 100 years, it takes the House more than one round to elect a speaker.
- January 5
  - Death and funeral of Pope Benedict XVI: The funeral of Pope emeritus Benedict XVI, who died on December 31, 2022, is held and is presided over by Pope Francis. His body is then interred in the crypt underneath St Peter's Basilica.
- January 7
  - 2023 Speaker of the United States House of Representatives election: In the early hours of January 7, after 15 rounds of voting, Republican Kevin McCarthy is elected speaker, when six Republicans who opposed McCarthy vote present, lowering the threshold needed to be elected.
- January 8
  - 2023 Brazilian Congress attack: Pro-Bolsonaro protesters storm the Brazilian Congress, Supreme Court and Presidential Palace.
- January 17
  - Gambian Vice-president, Badara Joof, dies in India.
- January 18
  - 2023 Brovary helicopter crash: A helicopter crashes into a kindergarten in Brovary, Kyiv, killing 14 people. Among the dead is Ukrainian Minister of Internal Affairs, Denys Monastyrskyy, his deputy Yevhen Yenin and another member of the Interior Ministry Yurii Lubkovych.
  - Vietnamese President Nguyễn Xuân Phúc resigns over corruption scandals in his government. Vice President Võ Thị Ánh Xuân becomes acting president, until the election of a new president by the National Assembly.
- January 19
  - 2023 French pension reform strikes: Mass protests and strikes break out in France after the government proposed raising the retirement age from 62 to 64.
- January 20
  - Gabon's foreign minister, Michaël Moussa Adamo, dies, after suffering a heart attack in a cabinet meeting.
- January 24
  - Israeli Interior and Health Minister, Aryeh Deri, is dismissed after the Supreme Court invalidates his appointment.
- January 25
  - The Prime Minister of New Zealand, Jacinda Ardern, leaves office after announcing her resignation on January 19. She is succeeded by Chris Hipkins, who was elected unopposed as the new leader of the Labour Party on January 22.
- January 26
  - 2023 Jenin killings: A raid by the IDF on a refugee camp in Jenin leaves 7 Palestinian militants and 3 civilians dead.
- January 27
  - Killing of Tyre Nichols: Video showing the killing of an unarmed black man, Tyre Nichols, by five black police officers is released by the Memphis Police Department.
- January 29
  - Premiership of Rishi Sunak: Nadhim Zahawi, Chairman of the Conservative Party, is fired after being fined by HMRC over his tax affairs.

== February ==
- February 1
  - Manuela Roka Botey becomes the first female Prime Minister of Equatorial Guinea.
  - By-elections are held in six Jatiya Sangsad constituencies which fell vacant after the resignation of Bangladesh Nationalist Party (BNP) lawmakers. Ruling 14-Party Alliance candidates win in every constituency except one amid 'voter-drought'.
- February 3
  - Bulgaria's National Assembly is dissolved after a government could not be formed. New elections are called for April 2.
- February 5
  - 2023 Cypriot presidential election: In the first round of presidential elections no candidate receives more than 50% of the vote. The two candidates who received the most votes in this round, Nikos Christodoulides and Andreas Mavroyiannis, advance to the second round, which will be held on February 12.
  - 2023 Ecuadorian constitutional referendum: Voters in Ecuador reject constitutional changes proposed by President Guillermo Lasso.
  - 2023 Monegasque general election: The Monegasque National Union wins all 24 seats in the National Council.
- February 6
  - A series of earthquakes in Turkey and Syria kill around 51,000 people, including two members of Turkey's parliament, Yakup Taş and Sıtkı Güvenç.
- February 7
  - February 2023 British cabinet reshuffle:
- February 8
  - South Korean Interior Minister Lee Sang-min is suspended from office pending an investigation into his handling of the Seoul Halloween crowd crush.
- February 12
  - NATO Secretary General Jens Stoltenberg announces that he will not seek reelection and will leave office in October.
  - 2023 Bangladeshi presidential election: Ruling Awami League's nominated candidate Mohammed Shahabuddin Chuppu declared as the winner of the election unopposed as no other candidacy was put forward.
- February 15
  - Scotland's longest serving First Minister, Nicola Sturgeon, announces her resignation after eight years in office.
  - The President of the World Bank, David Malpass, announces that he will step down on June 30.
- February 28
  - A deadly head-on collision between a passenger train and a freight carrier train on the Athens-Thessaloniki Main line in Tempi, near Larissa, in Greece. Fifty seven people were killed and 85 others were injured.
  - Singapore Senior Minister of State Dr. Janil Puthucheary announces the declassification of Singapore government files pertaining to the lead-up events of the enactment of Independence of Singapore Agreement 1965, dubbed Albatross file. Its declassification would be completed on December 8, 2025, releasing these files to the public.

== March ==
- March 2
  - Võ Văn Thưởng takes the oath as Vietnam's new president
- March 9
  - 75 Years of Friendship through Cricket Event, a diplomatic cricket event between India and Australia, hosted by Indian Prime Minister Narendra Modi.
- March 10
  - CCP General Secretary Xi Jinping is re-elected to an unprecedented third term as the President of China.
- March 11
  - Herder–farmer conflicts in Nigeria resulted in 16 people being killed by Fula gunmen at a police checkpoint in Zangon Kataf, Kaduna State, Nigeria.
- March 24
  - Rahul Gandhi, the official opposition leader of India is disqualified after being convicted in a defamation case filed by BJP MLA, Purnesh Modi.
- March 25
  - The 2023 New South Wales state election is held, electing the NSW Labor Party to a minority government formed with independent MLAs Alex Greenwich, Greg Piper, and Joe McGirr. The election marked the second time in Australian history that the Australian Labor Party held power in every mainland state and at the federal level simultaneously, which lasted until the August 24th 2024 Northern Territory general election.

== April ==
- April 7
  - 8 dead bodies of Bawm ethnic minority get recovered from the hills of Bandarban's Rowangchhari Upazila in Bangladesh. The 8 dead were reportedly members of the Kuki-Chin National Army, the armed wing of the Kuki-Chin National Front, who died in a shootout with a faction of the United People's Democratic Front.
- April 30
  - The 2023 Paraguayan general election is held, in which the conservative Santiago Peña won the presidency.

== May ==
- May 16
  - Impeachment hearing begins in Ecuador against President Guillermo Lasso: Lasso could trigger the ‘two-way death’ clause in Ecuador’s constitution, dissolving both the legislature and ending his presidency.

== July ==
- July 3
  - The death of a teenager in a Paris suburb sparks unrest across France, resulting in numerous arrests. Nahel Merzouk, a 17-year-old of Algerian descent, is fatally shot by a police officer in Nanterre earlier in the week. The incident triggered a wave of protests, with violent clashes occurring for five consecutive nights.

== August ==
- August 7
  - Rahul Gandhi is reinstated as a Lok Sabha member after the Supreme Court of India stayed the defamation case against him.
- August 10
  - The United States House Subcommittee on Government Operations and the Federal Workforce holds a televised investigative hearing on the U.S. government's response to and overall recovery efforts from Hurricane Ian, which struck Florida in September 2022.
- August 20
  - Bernardo Arévalo is elected President of Guatemala defeating former First Lady, Sandra Torres in the second round of the general election in Guatemala.

== September ==
- September 1
  - Presidential elections are held in Singapore where former Senior Minister Tharman Shanmugaratnam was declared President-elect in a landslide. Tharman was sworn as the ninth President later on the 14th that same month.
- September 30
  - Parliamentary elections are held in Slovakia in which SMER emerges as the largest party.

== October ==
- October 7
  - October 7 attacks

== International communiqués ==
- The United Nations General Assembly resolutions ES-11/6, ES-10/21, and ES-10/22 have been adopted

== See also ==
- List of current legislatures
