= Rebryk =

Rebryk, Rebrik (Ukrainian: Ребрик) is a surname of Ukrainian origin. Notable people with the surname include:

- Bohdan Rebryk (1938–2023), Ukrainian politician
- Denys Rebryk (born 1985), Ukrainian footballer
- Vera Rebrik (born 1989), Ukrainian-born Russian track and field athlete
