= Anton Gerashchenko =

Ukrainian politician and economist (born 1979)

- Антон Геращенко
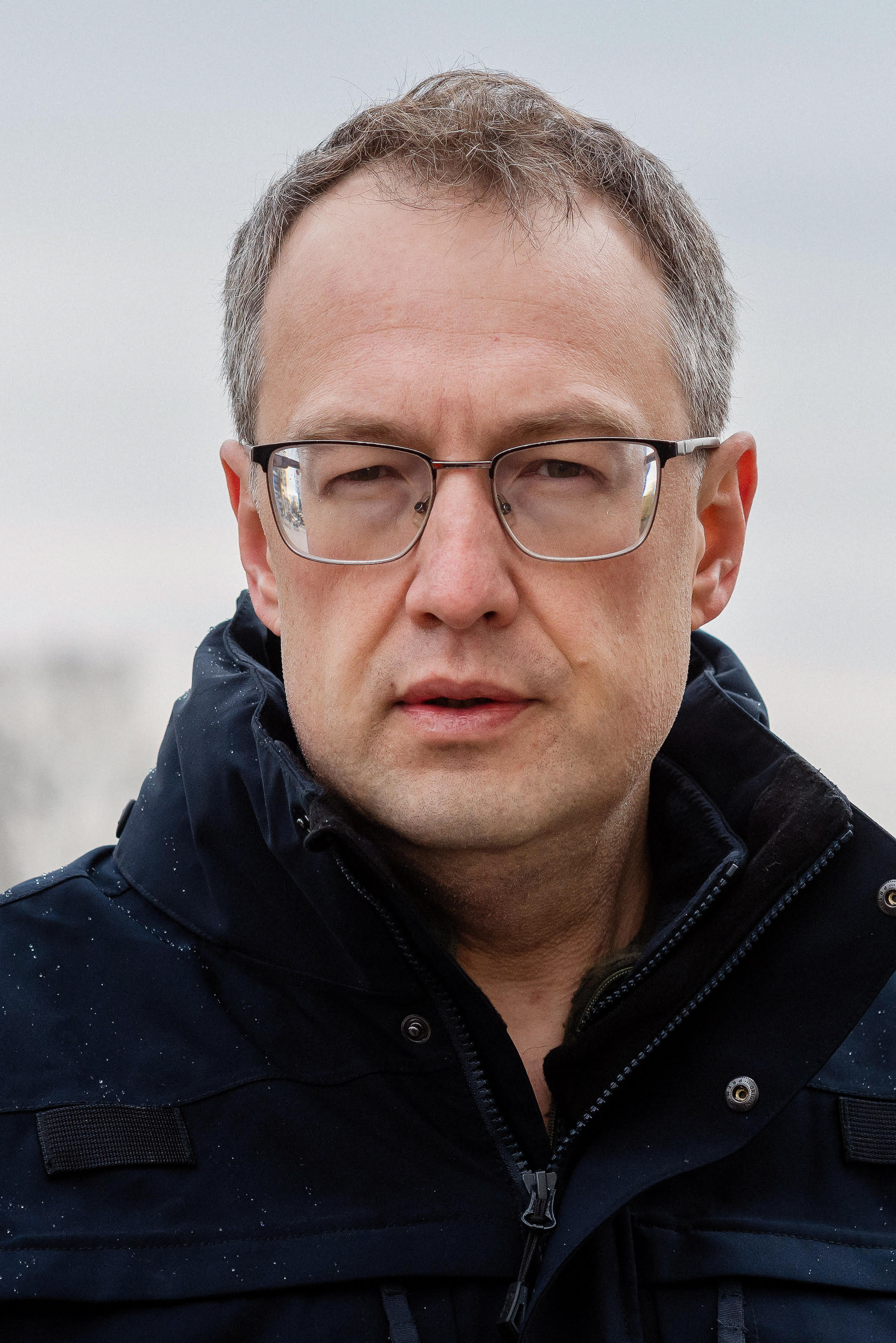
- Gerashchenko in 2022

Deputy Minister of Internal Affairs
- In office 25 September 2019 – 4 August 2021
- President: Volodymyr Zelenskyy
- Minister: Arsen Avakov (2019–2021), Denys Monastyrsky (2021)

People's Deputy of Ukraine
- In office 27 November 2014 – 28 August 2019

Personal details
- Born: Anton Yuriyovych Gerashchenko; 10 February 1979 (age 47) Kharkiv, Ukrainian SSR, Soviet Union (now Ukraine)
- Party: People's Front; Our Ukraine
- Other political affiliations: Independent
- Education: Kharkiv National University of Economics
- Occupation: Advisor to the Minister of Internal Affairs of Ukraine (2021–present)
- Committees: Secretary of the Ukrainian Parliament Committee on Legislative Support of Law Enforcement (2014–2019)

Anton Yuriyovych Gerashchenko (Ukrainian: Антон Юрійович Геращенко, romanized: Anton Yuriyovych Herashchenko, born 10 February 1979) is a current official advisor and a former deputy minister at the Ukrainian Ministry of Internal Affairs. He is a former member of the Ukrainian parliament (Verkhovna Rada) from 2014 to 2019, and was the subject of an assassination attempt in part because of his actions, which was prevented by the SBU.

== Biography ==
When Arsen Avakov became the Minister of Internal Affairs in 2014, Gerashchenko became his adviser. In this role, Gerashchenko briefed journalists about the formation of the Donbas Battalion, the Azov Battalion, and the shooting down of Malaysia Airlines Flight 17.

Gerashchenko was elected to parliament in the 26 October 2014 Ukrainian parliamentary election, representing the People's Front in the multi-mandate nationwide district, he was placed 21st (as an independent candidate) on the party's election list. Gerashchenko was one of the founders of a database of separatists called "Myrotvorets" (Peacekeeper).

He was secretary of the Verkhovna Rada (Ukraine's national parliament) Committee on Legislative Support of Law Enforcement. In parliament, one of his assistant-consultants was the future Interior Minister Denys Monastyrsky.

In January 2017, it was announced that the Security Service of Ukraine (SBU) had prevented an assassination attempt against Gerashchenko. The SBU had had the two assassins under surveillance for over a month and arrested them in the act with an explosive device in their possession.

The SBU stated that the assassins had been in prison in the Russian-occupied Crimea, until they agreed to assassinate Gerashchenko. The SBU claimed that the assassins were coordinated by Andrey Tikhonov. Tikhonov currently lives in Belgorod in Russia, and used to be a Ukrainian citizen, who had fought against Ukraine on the side of the Luhansk People's Republic.

After the July 2019 Ukrainian parliamentary election, Gerashchenko did not return to parliament because he did not take part in the election. On 25 September 2019, the Cabinet of Ministers appointed him one of six or seven deputy ministers at the Ministry of Internal Affairs. The minister was Arsen Avakov.

After Avakov stepped down as Interior Minister on 15 July 2021, Gerashchenko became an official advisor for the new minister, Denys Monastyrsky. On 4 August 2021, he was dismissed as deputy minister. In late September 2021, Gerashchenko was appointed the coordinator of the new "Office for Business Protection" (Note: This bureau was established to improve communications between entrepreneurs and the security forces.) within the Ministry of Internal Affairs.
