= North Slavic languages =

Group of Slavic languages

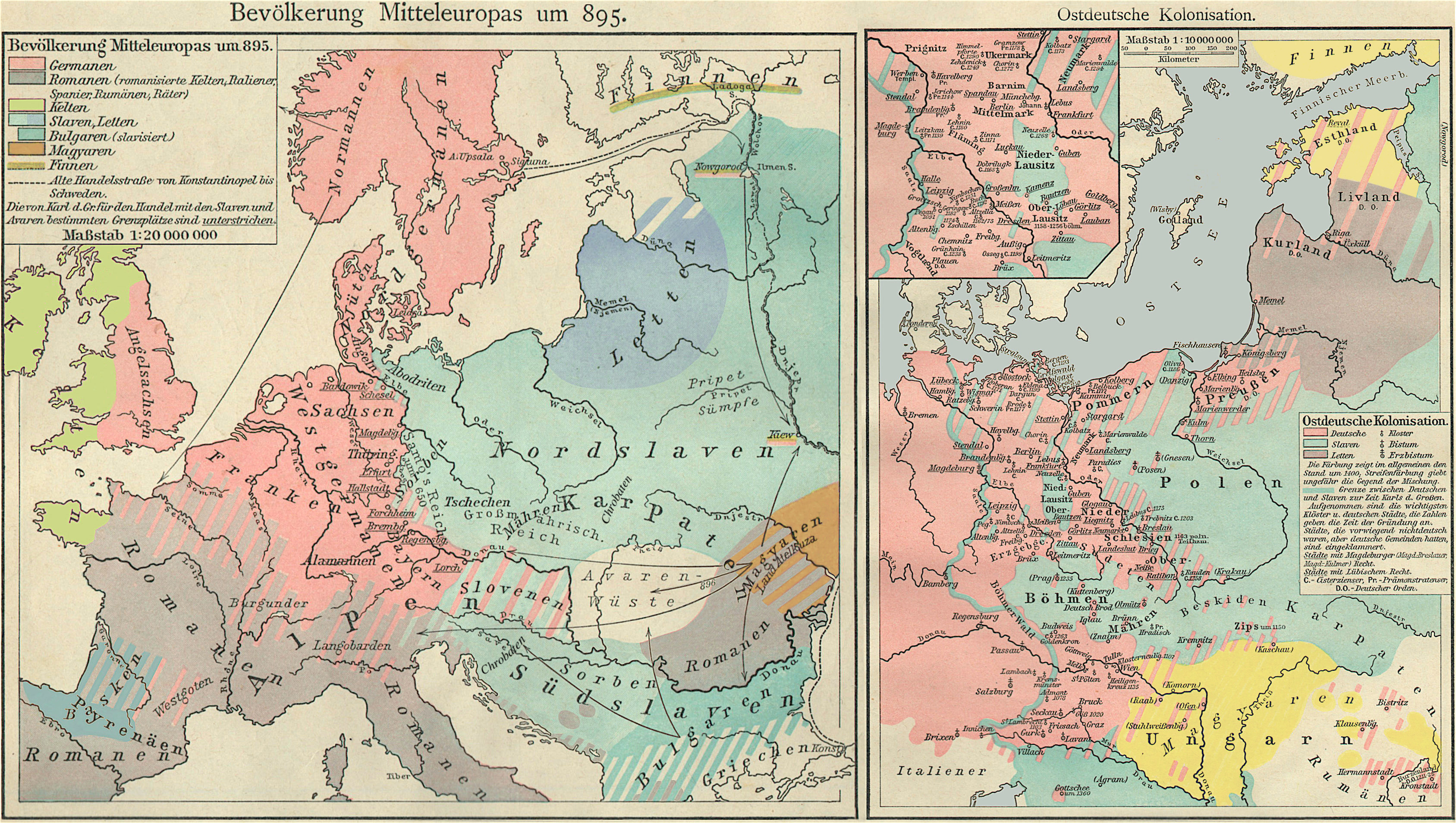
A German map from 1893 showing North Slavs and South Slavs in 893

The term North Slavic languages is used in three main senses:

- for a number of proposed groupings or subdivisions of the Slavic languages. However, "North Slavic" is not widely used in this sense. Modern scholars usually divide the Slavic languages into West Slavic, East Slavic, and South Slavic.
- for the West Slavic and East Slavic languages considered as a combined unit, particularly when contrasted to South Slavic languages.
- for a number of constructed languages that were created in the 20th and 21st century, and have been derived from existing Slavic languages.

== Proposed subdivisions ==
Historically, the term "North Slav" has been used in academia since at least the first half of the 19th century. Since then the concept continued to see use in various publications.

The following uses of the term "North Slavs" or "North Slavic" are found:

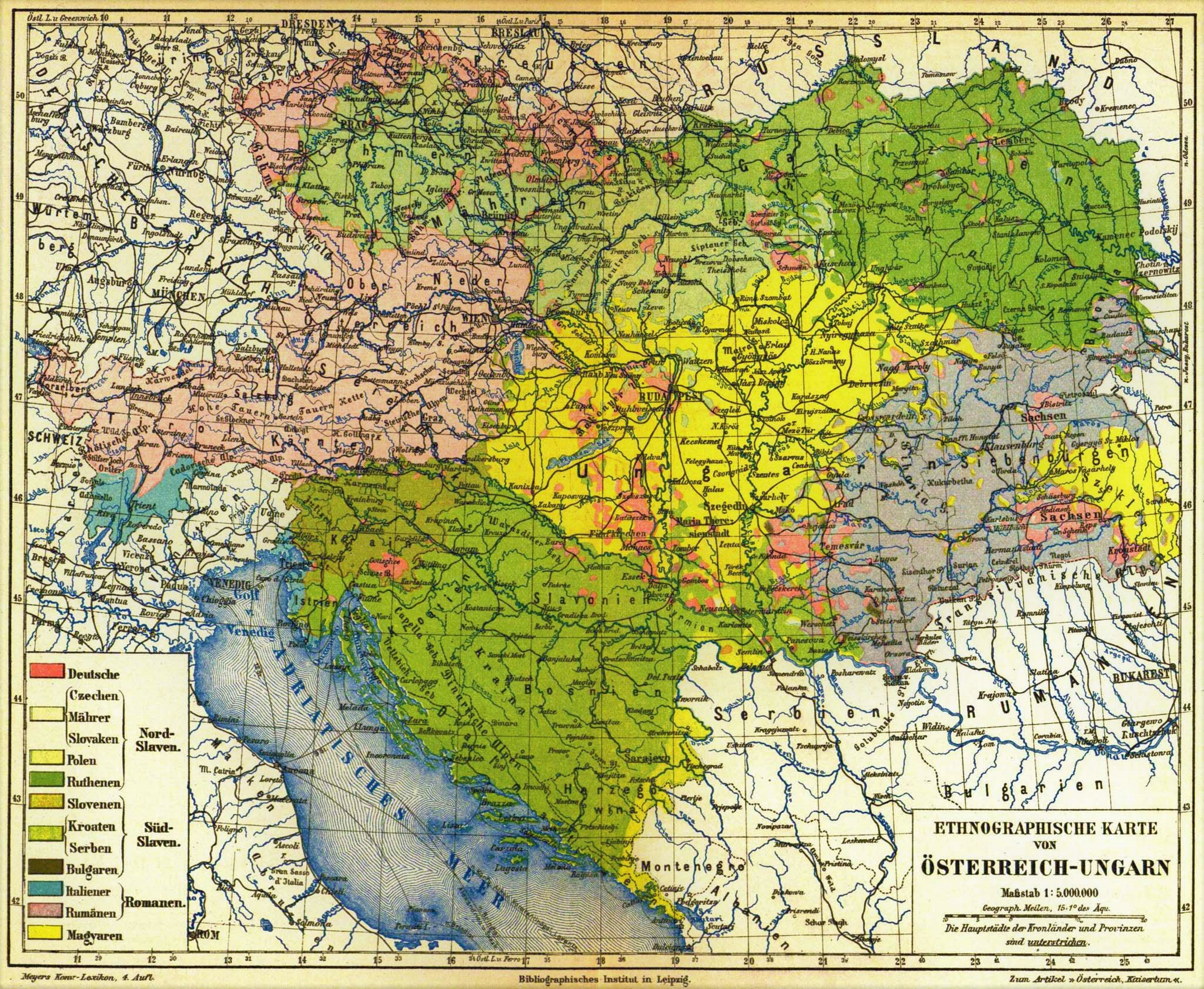
In this map of Austria-Hungary from Meyers Konversations-Lexikon (1890), Czechs, Moravians, Slovaks, Poles, and "Ruthenians" are marked as "North-Slavs", while other Slavic groups are marked as "South-Slavs".

- 'North Slavs', 'Northslavs' or 'North Hungarian Slavs' were used as synonyms for the combination of Slovaks and Rusyns living in the northern parts of the Kingdom of Hungary (1526–1867) within the Austrian Empire by several Slavic authors and politicians writing between 1848 and 1861. They imagined Slovaks and Rusyns to be one nation or ethnic group consisting of two equal tribes (although Moravčík 1861 regarded Rusyns as a subordinate tribe to the Slovak nation) that inhabited a shared ethno-territory (Slovakia and Subcarpathia/Transcarpathia) and was entitled to political representation in the Imperial Council of Austria.
- 'North Slavs', 'Czechoslavs' and 'Slovaks' were used as synonyms for the combination of Czechs, Slovaks and Rusniaks/Rustines (Rusyns) by Ján Thomášek (1841). The ethno-territory that he imagined corresponds with that of the later First Czechoslovak Republic (1918–1938).
- As a synonym for the combination of Czechs, Slovaks, and Poles (nowadays more commonly known as 'West Slavs').
- As an extinct branch of Slavic. Anatoli Zhuravlyov suggested that a separate, now extinct, branch of North Slavic languages once existed, different from both South, West, and East Slavic. The dialect formerly spoken in the vicinity of Novgorod (the Old Novgorod dialect) contains several Proto-Slavic archaisms that did not survive in any other Slavic language, and may be considered a remnant of an ancient North Slavic branch. Another candidate is Slovincian in the Lekhitic subgroup.
- An as alternative to or combination of the West Slavic and East Slavic languages into one group, due to the fact that the South Slavic dialects were geographically cut off by the Hungarian settlement of the Pannonian plain in the 9th century along with Austria and Romania being geographical barriers, in addition to the Black Sea. Due to this geographical separation, the North Slavs and South Slavs developed independently of each other with noteworthy cultural differences; as such, various theorists claim that the language communities often grouped into West and East Slavic sub-branches share enough linguistic characteristics to be categorised together as North Slavs. North Slavonic peoples today include the Belarusians, Czechs, Poles, Rusyns, Russians, Slovaks, Sorbs, and Ukrainians. Ukrainian and Belarusian have both been hugely influenced by Polish in the past centuries due to their geographic and cultural proximity, as well as due to the Polonisation of the Ruthenian population of the Polish–Lithuanian Commonwealth.

The greatest disparities within the Slavic language family are between South Slavic tongues and the rest of the Slavonic languages.
Professor Michał Łesiów once said that "there are no two languages in the Slavic area that were as equally close to each other as Polish and Ruthenian". According to Kostiantyn Tyshchenko, Ukrainian shares 70% common vocabulary with Polish and 66% with Slovak, which puts them both ahead of Russian (at 62%) in their lexical proximity to Ukrainian. Furthermore, Tyschenko identified 82 grammatical and phonetic features of the Ukrainian tongue – Polish, Czech and Slovak share upwards of 20 of these characteristics with Ukrainian, whereas Russian apparently only 11. In contrast to other dialects of Slovak, Eastern dialects (sometimes called Slovjak) are less intelligible with Czech and more with Polish and Rusyn. Much overlap can be found between the Northwest and Northeast branches, as even some authors who use the West Slavic and East Slavic categories sometimes utilise the North Slav model instead where it is relevant. Tomasz Kamusella writes that where linguistic continua are considered to start and end is usually dictated by politics rather than linguistics, which is the case among North Slavonic nations too. Majority North Slavonic groups today include the Belarusians, Czechs, Kashubians, Poles, Silesians, Rusyns, Russians, Slovaks, Sorbs, and Ukrainians. The language areas of the North Slavs and South Slavs have been separated by a broad zones containing three other language communities, namely German, Hungarian, and Romanian.

In terms of language, the greatest contrasts are evident between South Slavic tongues and the rest of the family. Moreover, there are many exceptions and whole dialects that break the division of East and West Slavic languages. According to this view, it makes more sense to divide the Slavs into two main linguistic groups: the North Slavs and the South Slavs, which can then be further categorised as the Northwest tongues (Czech, Kashubian, Polish, Silesian, Slovak, and Sorbian) and the Northeast ones (Belarusian, Russian, Rusyn, and Ukrainian) – whereas the Southern branch is split into the widely accepted groups of the Southwest languages (Serbo-Croatian and Slovene) and the Southeast tongues (Bulgarian and Macedonian). This model is argued as being more appropriate and linguistically accurate than the triple dissection of east, west and south. Geographer O.T. Ford also writes of the Slavs being "conventionally" divided into three sub-branches (West, East, South), but "in reality" divided only by geographic isolation into two bands that form two dialect continua: North and South – a view mirrored by linguist Tomasz Kamusella. Tracing back to the Greek East and Latin West split in Late Antiquity, there are cultural divisions within the North Slavonic language family with regard to writing systems and religions: the West Slavic languages mostly use versions of the Latin script and have or historically had a Catholic-majority population, while the East Slavic languages are usually written in the Cyrillic script and have or historically had an Orthodox-majority population. A similar east-west split exists for people speaking South Slavic languages in the Balkans, although the Latin script is spreading in countries where Serbo-Croatian is frequently spoken and the majority population is Orthodox, such as Montenegro. The North Slavic and South Slavic-speaking territories are thus both generally geographically divided between Eastern and Western Christianity, and the great majority of all Eastern Orthodox believers in the world are found in the eastern parts of both the North Slavic and South Slavic areas, while a minority are Eastern-rite Catholics.

- The concept has also been utilised in the archaeological studies as well as that of the pre-Christian beliefs of Slavic peoples in the Early Middle Ages by scholars in the 2010s.

== Constructed languages ==
"North Slavic" has been used as a name for several 20th- and 21st-century constructed languages forming a fictional North Slavic branch of the Slavic languages. Their main inspiration is the lack of a North Slavic branch vis-à-vis the traditional West, East and South Slavic branches. Usually, they are part of a larger alternative history scheme and may be based on elements from Old Novgorodian or North Russian dialects, historical pidgins like Russenorsk or interference from non-Slavic languages such as the Uralic languages, the Baltic languages or the North Germanic languages. The best-known examples of constructed North Slavic languages are:

- Sevorian (Sievrøsku, 1992), the language of a fictional island in the Baltic Sea;
- three Uralic-inspired languages from the alternative history project Ill Bethisad:
  - Vozgian (Vŭozgašchai, 1996),
  - Nassian (Nassika, 2001) and
  - Skuodian (2002); and
- Novegradian (Новеградескей лизике, Novegradeskej lizike, 2006), a project embedded in a highly elaborated fictional context.

Also included in the group of fictional North Slavic languages are five interrelated language projects (Seversk, Slavëni, Slavisk, Lydnevi, Mrezian) created around 2001 by Libor Sztemon, although they lack a fictional background and an explanation what exactly qualifies them as North Slavic.

== See also ==
- South Germanic

== Bibliography ==
- Comrie, Bernard; Corbett, Greville G., The Slavonic languages (London, 2003), pp. 75 & 114–120.
- Danylenko, Andrii, 2006, "The 'Greek Accusative' vs. the 'New Slavic Accusative' in the Impersonal Environment: an Areal or Structural Discrepancy?", in: Andrii Danylenko, "Slavica et Islamica. Ukrainian in Context". München: Otto Sagner Verlag, 243-265.
- Hult, Arne, "On the verbal morphology of the South Slavic languages (in comparison with the North Slavic languages, especially Russian", Papers from First Conference on Formal Approaches to South Slavic Languages. Plovdiv October 1995. Dragvoll, University of Trondheim, Linguistics Department (= University of Trondheim. Working Papers in Linguistics 28), ss. 105-35. (23)
- Kamusella, Tomasz; Nomachi, Motoki; Gibson, Catherine (2016). The Palgrave Handbook of Slavic Languages, Identities and Borders. London: Palgrave Macmillan. p. 561. ISBN 9781137348395.
- Kortlandt, Frederik, "Early dialectal diversity in South Slavic II", in: Dutch Contributions to the Thirteenth International Congress of Slavists, Ljubljana: Linguistics (SSGL 30). Amsterdam – New York: Rodopi, 2003, 215-235.
- Kortlandt, Frederik, From Proto-Indo-European to Slavic
- Timberlake, Alan, 1978, "On the History of the Velar Phonemes in North Slavic" [in Russian with English synopsis]. In Henrik Birnbaum, ed., American Contributions to the Eighth International Congress of Slavists, vol. 1, Linguistics and Poetics. Columbus, OH: Slavica Publishers.
- Tommola, Hannu, 2000, "On the Perfect in North Slavic." Östen Dahl (ed.), Tense and Aspect in the Languages of Europe. Berlin: Mouton de Gruyter, 441-478.
