= Flyr =

Flyr may refer to:

- Lowell David Flyr, an American botanist, botanical author abbreviation Flyr
- Flyr (airline), a defunct Norwegian low-cost airline
