= Ill Bethisad =

Alternate history of the Earth

Version of the logo created in 2006 for use by members of the project. This or variants of it has been used on various websites over the years

Ill Bethisad is a collaborative alternate history project which had 58 active participants as of March 2021. Originally created by Andrew Smith from New Zealand, it was initiated in 1997 as the Brithenig Project. It can be characterized as an instance of the subgenre of steampunk. Ill Bethisad has a largely encyclopedic character, consisting of constructed languages, written histories, timelines, news items, maps, flags and other images, short movies, descriptions of cultures, religions and technologies, as well as short stories.

== Constructed languages ==
Constructed languages play an important role in Ill Bethisad, and it can be said that Ill Bethisad is the central meeting point, if not the cradle, of an entire subgenre of conlangs, namely alternative languages. To date there are over thirty languages at varying levels of construction that play part. Among the languages spoken in Ill Bethisad are Brithenig (a Romance language with strong Celtic substrate influences, based on Welsh), Wenedyk (Polish as a Romance language), Slvanjek (Slovak as a Romance language), Bohemian (Pémišna: Germanized Czech), Dalmatian (a Romance language similar to Romanian, based on the actual extinct language of the same name), Xliponian (another Romance language with a superficial resemblance to Albanian, spoken in our world's Epirus) and several Finnish-like "North Slavic" languages, including Nassian (spoken in our world's Karelia).

The name Ill Bethisad itself is Brithenig for the universe, a calque from Welsh bydysawd or Latin baptizatum.

In addition, many other languages from our world have been changed in some way, although some, like German, Italian, or Russian, appear to be exactly the same. In many cases, as with Spanish, English, or Japanese, the changes are relatively slight and mainly affect orthography or Romanizations. One example is the language of Galicia, which is called Ruthenian (rather than Ukrainian) and is written with Polish orthography (rather than Cyrillic; see Ukrainian Latin Alphabet for real-world examples). Others are more drastic; Ill Bethisad Croatian, for example, is an invented Slavic language that in many respects is closer to Czech than our world's Croatian, and the Dalmatian of Ill Bethisad seems to be influenced by Slavic languages more than its real world counterpart.

== Points of divergence ==
The central point of divergence of Ill Bethisad is a stronger Roman Empire. Nevertheless, history runs mostly parallel to the history of the real world, so that many countries and regions have their own separate points of divergence:

- Latin developed into a Romance language in the British Isles (Wales and western England) and Central Europe (Poland and Slovakia) as it did in France and continental Europe.
- The Partitions of Veneda (historical alternative to Poland) were stopped by Napoleon, and the Venedo-Lithuanian Commonwealth exists to date as the Republic of the Two Crowns. Its present territory is roughly the same as the combined territories of Poland, Lithuania, and East Prussia during the period between the First and Second World War. It also has a colony in Africa, Gambia (part of which, in real-world history, belonged to a prince who was a vassal of seventeenth-century Poland). Another difference is that while the Veneds are Catholics like the Poles, most Lithuanians still confess to paganism, which today has developed into a form similar to that of the Romuva religion of our world.
- A Czech-like Germanic language developed in Bohemia and Silesia under pressure from the Habsburg nobility, who wanted a unified language for the territory.
- The Bolsheviks in Russia were defeated by the White Army, producing a nationalistic government.
- The Kingdom of Castille and the Aragonese Crown never joined in Spain.
- Napoleon neither attacked Russia nor was defeated at Waterloo.
- The American Revolution did not happen and therefore the United States as we know it does not exist. Instead, there is a North American League, each state of which is still subject to a European crown.

In general, there are more independent countries than there are in the real world, and constitutional monarchies, federations, colonies, and condominia are far more numerous. The history of Ill Bethisad, on the whole, often sees extinct or minority languages such as Catalan, Low Saxon, Crimean Gothic as well as others remaining more widely spoken in their respective regions than they have become in real-world history. Also, technologies that have either fallen out of favor or failed to develop in our world are explored and broadly used. For example, zeppelins and ekranoplans or ground-effect vehicles are still in use for both military and civil purposes. Computers are not highly developed, and there is no 'Silicon Valley' of North America, but information technology centres are instead found in Ireland.
