= Lydnevi =

Fictional North Slavic language

- Created by: Libor Sztemon
- Date: 2002
- Setting and usage: Auxiliary language
- Purpose: constructed languages: international auxiliary languages; zonal constructed languages; Lydnevi
- Writing system: Latin, Cyrillic

Language codes
- ISO 639-3: qly (private use)
- Glottolog: None
- IETF: art-x-lydnevi (private use)

Lydnevi is a fictional North Slavic language created in 2002 by the Czech linguist Libor Sztemon.

== Phonology ==
=== Consonants ===
		Labial	Alveolar	Palatal	Velar	Glottal
Plosive	Voiceless	p	t tʰ		k	
Plosive	Voiced	b	d		g	
Affricate	Voiceless		ts			
Affricate	Voiced					
Fricative	Voiceless	f	s	ʃ	x	h
Fricative	Voiced	β v	z	ʒ	ɣ	
Trill			r			
Nasal		m	n	ɲ		
Approximant			l	j		

In addition, ⟨x⟩ represents ɣ͡z.

=== Vowels ===
Lydnevi has 8 monophthongs and 6 diphthongs.

	Front	Central	Back
Close	i		ɯ u
Mid	e ɛː	ə	o
Open	a		

Lydnevi's diphthongs are ⟨ai⟩ /aɪ̯/, ⟨ei⟩ /eɪ̯/, ⟨oi⟩ /oɪ̯/, ⟨au⟩ /au̯/, ⟨eu⟩ /eu̯/, and ⟨ou⟩ /ou̯/.

== Orthography ==
Lydnevi alphabet
Uppercase	Lowercase	IPA
A	a	/a/
B	b	/b/
C	c	/ts/
D	d	/d/
E	e	/e/
É	é	/ɛː/
F	f	/f/
G	g	/g/
H	h	/h/
I	i	/i/
J	j	/j/
K	k	/k/
L	l	/l/
M	m	/m/
N	n	/n/
O	o	/o/
Ø	ø	/ə/
P	p	/p/
Q	q	/ɣ/
R	r	/r/
S	s	/s/
Š	š	/ʃ/
T	t	/t/
U	u	/u/
V	v	/v/
W	w	/β/
X	x	/ɣ͡z/
Y	y	/ɯ/
Z	z	/z/
Ž	ž	/ʒ/

Lydnevi also has three digraphs: ⟨ch⟩ /x/, ⟨nj⟩ /ɲ/, and ⟨th⟩ /tʰ/.

== Example ==
Sztemon included the Lord's Prayer as an example text on his website.

Otec navo,
Jaš jési na nebesai,
Da jest posvetyn tavo nam.
Da jest prihedyn tavo kralestvo.
Da jest stanyn tavo vilja, jako na nébe, tako y na zéma.
As navo bréd e keždanyn davat i nave danas.
Ø adpoštat i nave as navo dluhem jako y me adpoštalesom i navo dluhare.
Ø nevøvedat as nave vø pokušenje, ale nesvabodat as nave é zølyn.
Navad tavo jest kralestvo y moc y slava navéke.
Amén.
