= Denys Monastyrsky =

Ukrainian lawyer and politician (1980–2023)

- Денис Монастирський
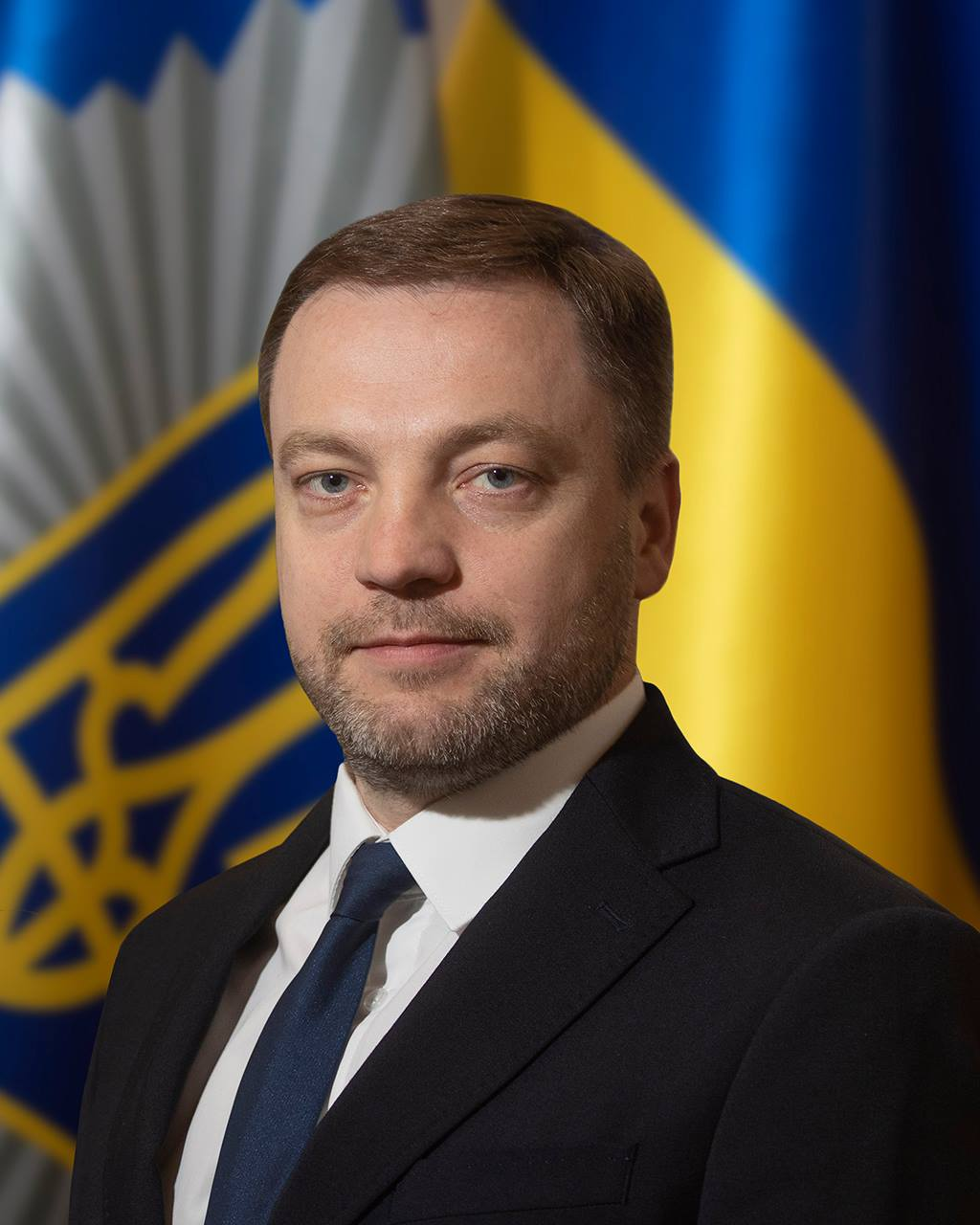
- Official portrait, 2021

12th Minister of Internal Affairs of Ukraine
- In office 16 July 2021 – 18 January 2023
- President: Volodymyr Zelenskyy
- Prime Minister: Denys Shmyhal
- Preceded by: Arsen Avakov
- Succeeded by: Ihor Klymenko

People's Deputy of Ukraine

9th convocation
- In office 29 August 2019 – 16 July 2021
- Constituency: Servant of the People

Personal details
- Born: 12 June 1980 Khmelnytskyi, Soviet Union
- Died: 18 January 2023 (aged 42) Brovary, Kyiv Oblast, Ukraine
- Cause of death: Helicopter crash
- Party: Servant of the People
- Spouse: Zhanna Monastyrska
- Children: 2
- Education: Khmelnytskyi University of Management and Law (PhD)

Military service
- Allegiance: Ukraine
- Years of service: 2022–2023
- Commands: Ministry of Internal Affairs of Ukraine
- Battles/wars: Russian invasion of Ukraine

Denys Anatoliiovych Monastyrsky (Note: In this name that follows East Slavic naming customs, the patronymic is Anatoliiovych and the family name is Monastyrsky.) (Note: Also transliterated as Monastyrskyi) (Ukrainian: Денис Анатолійович Монастирський, IPA: [deˈnɪs ɐnɐˈtɔl⁽ʲ⁾ijowɪtʃ monɐsˈtɪrsʲkɪj]; 12 June 1980 – 18 January 2023) was a Ukrainian lawyer and politician who served as Minister of Internal Affairs of Ukraine from 16 July 2021 until his death in a helicopter crash on 18 January 2023. He had been very close to Volodymyr Zelenskyy since the beginning of his presidential campaign.

== Biography ==
Denys Monastyrsky was born in Khmelnytskyi, then in the Ukrainian Soviet Socialist Republic of the Soviet Union, on 12 June 1980. He was a graduate of Faculty of Law of the Khmelnytskyi University of Management and Law. Monastyrsky was also a former student at the Koretsky Institute of State and Law of the National Academy of Sciences of Ukraine. He had a PhD in law.

In 2007, Monastyrsky started his career as a lawyer. He also headed the department of lawmaking and scientific expertise of the research part of the Khmelnytskyi University of Management and Law, where he worked as an associate professor.

Monastyrsky was a co-founder and a member of the board of the Podilia Youth Cultural Association "Into the Future through Culture".

Between 2014 and 2019, Monastyrsky was an assistant-consultant to Anton Herashchenko in the 8th Ukrainian Verkhovna Rada.

In the run-up to the 2019 Ukrainian presidential election Monastyrsky was presented as an expert of presidential candidate Volodymyr Zelenskyy's "team" on law enforcement reform. Zelenskyy won the election and was inaugurated as President of Ukraine on 20 May 2019.

Monastyrsky was a candidate for Servant of the People in the 2019 Ukrainian parliamentary election. He was placed No. 19 on the national election list and elected to the Ukrainian parliament.

In parliament, he became head of the parliamentary Committee on Law Enforcement Affairs. According to an analysis by Civil movement "Chesno" he was one of the people's deputies who submitted the most legislative initiatives.

After Interior Minister Arsen Avakov had submitted his resignation as Interior Minister on 12 July 2021, Monastyrsky was appointed Minister of Internal Affairs by 271 MPs on 16 July 2021. Anton Herashchenko became one of his official advisors at the Ministry.

In September 2022, Monastyrsky participated in the largest prisoner exchange operation between Ukraine and Russia, when 215 Ukrainian soldiers returned home, including more than 100 fighters and commanders of the Azov Regiment.

Throughout the 2022 Russian invasion of Ukraine, Monastyrsky was among the top security officials who remained in Kyiv, the capital, with Zelenskyy in the first days of the war as Russia's army bore down on the city. As Ukraine's minister for internal affairs, he helped shape Ukraine's wartime goals and oversaw the country's National Police, State Emergency Service and the State Border Guard Service.

== Death ==
Monastyrsky, along with his deputy Yevhen Yenin, and Secretary of State of the Ministry of Internal Affairs Yurii Lubkovych, were killed in a helicopter crash on 18 January 2023, in Brovary, an eastern suburb of the capital Kyiv. The helicopter hit a kindergarten school as it crashed, and a child was among the 14 killed. At least 25 others were injured.

Kyrylo Tymoshenko said at a briefing that the officials were heading to one of the hot spots of the war front. The Security Service of Ukraine has started an investigation into the cause of the crash in Brovary.

Monastyrsky's friend and MP Maria Mezentseva said it was "a tragedy for everyone" as Mr. Monastyrsky's ministry was playing a key role in Ukraine's response to the invasion. He was also very close to Zelenskyy from day one of his presidential campaign, she told the BBC.

The funeral ceremony for Monastyrsky and other ministry employees who were killed took place in Ukrainian House on 21 January 2023. Top officials, including Zelenskyy and his wife, Olena Zelenska, attended the funeral, offering condolences to the relatives of the crash victims.

Monastyrsky was buried on 21 January 2023 at the Baikove Cemetery in Kyiv.

== Awards ==
- Order of Merit, 3rd class (2022).

== Notes ==
Political offices
Preceded by Arsen Avakov	Minister of Internal Affairs; 2021–2023	Succeeded by Ihor Klymenko; Acting
