= Vadym Filashkin =

Ukrainian statesman

- Вадим Філашкін
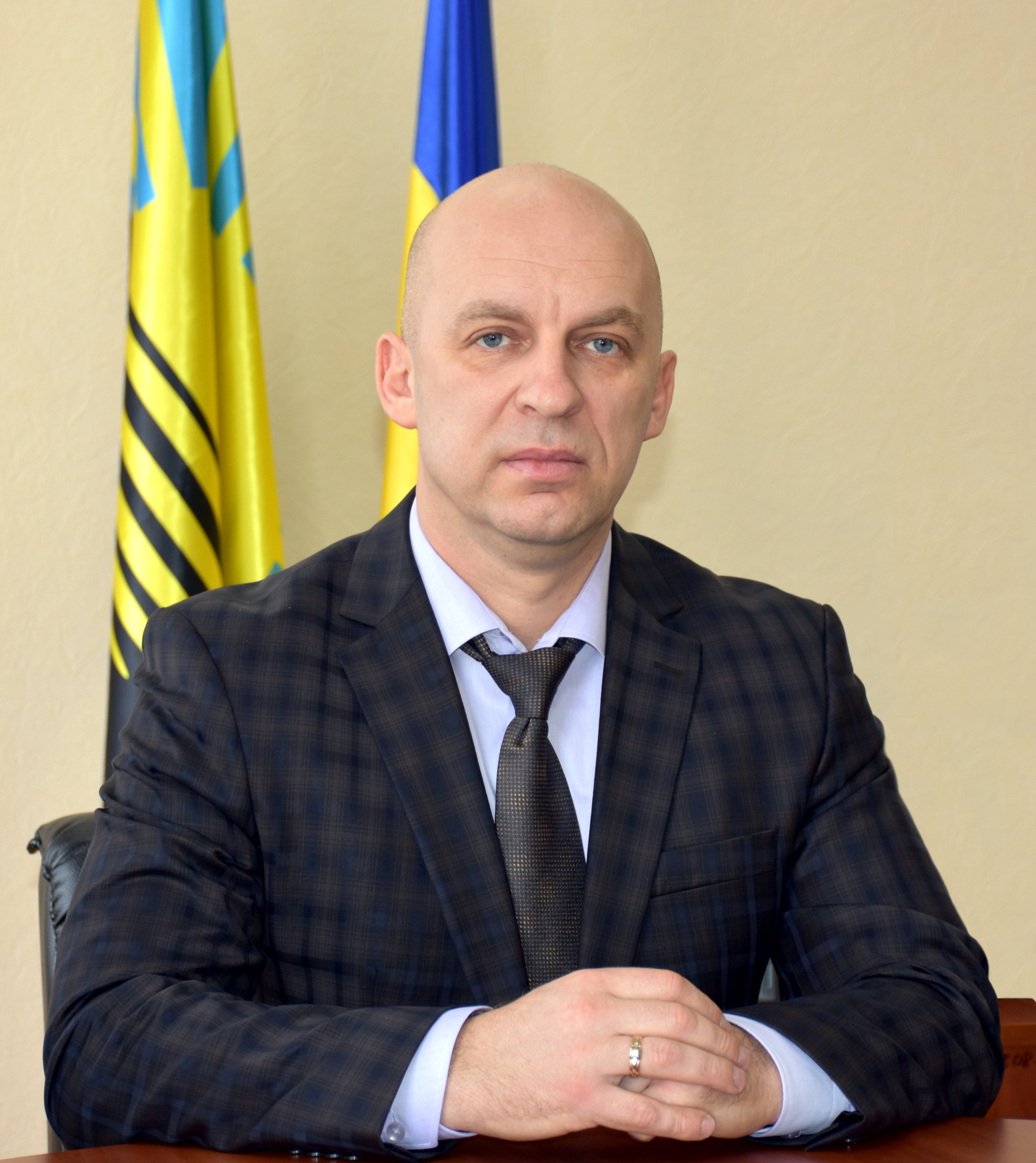
- Official portrait, 2019

Governor of Donetsk Oblast
- Disputed (Note: Control over Donetsk Oblast is disputed due to the Russo-Ukrainian War. Denis Pushilin was installed by Russia as Head of the Donetsk People's Republic, while Filashkin is loyal to the Ukrainian government.)
- Assumed office 27 December 2023
- Preceded by: Ihor Moroz (acting)

Deputy Head of the Donetsk Oblast State Administration
- In office February 2019 – 27 December 2023

Personal details
- Born: Vadym Serhiyovych Filaskhin; 14 June 1975 (age 50) Arbuzynka, Ukrainian SSR, Soviet Union

Vadym Serhiyovych Filashkin (Ukrainian: Вадим Сергійович Філашкін; born 14 June 1975) is a Ukrainian politician, who is currently the Governor of Donetsk Oblast since 27 December 2023.

== Biography ==
Vadym Filashkin was born on 14 June 1975. He received his higher education at the Mykolaiv State Pedagogical University, majoring in "pedagogy and methods of secondary education, and physical culture and pre-conscription training". Then, in 2008, he graduated as a lawyer at the Kyiv National University of Internal Affairs.

From November 2015 to August 2016, he was the deputy chief of the Main Directorate of the National Police in the Donetsk Oblast.

In February 2019, he was the deputy head of the Donetsk regional state administration.

On 27 December 2023, Filashkin was appointed Governor of Donetsk Oblast.
