= Pavlo Kyrylenko =

Ukrainian politician (born 1986)

- Павло Кириленко
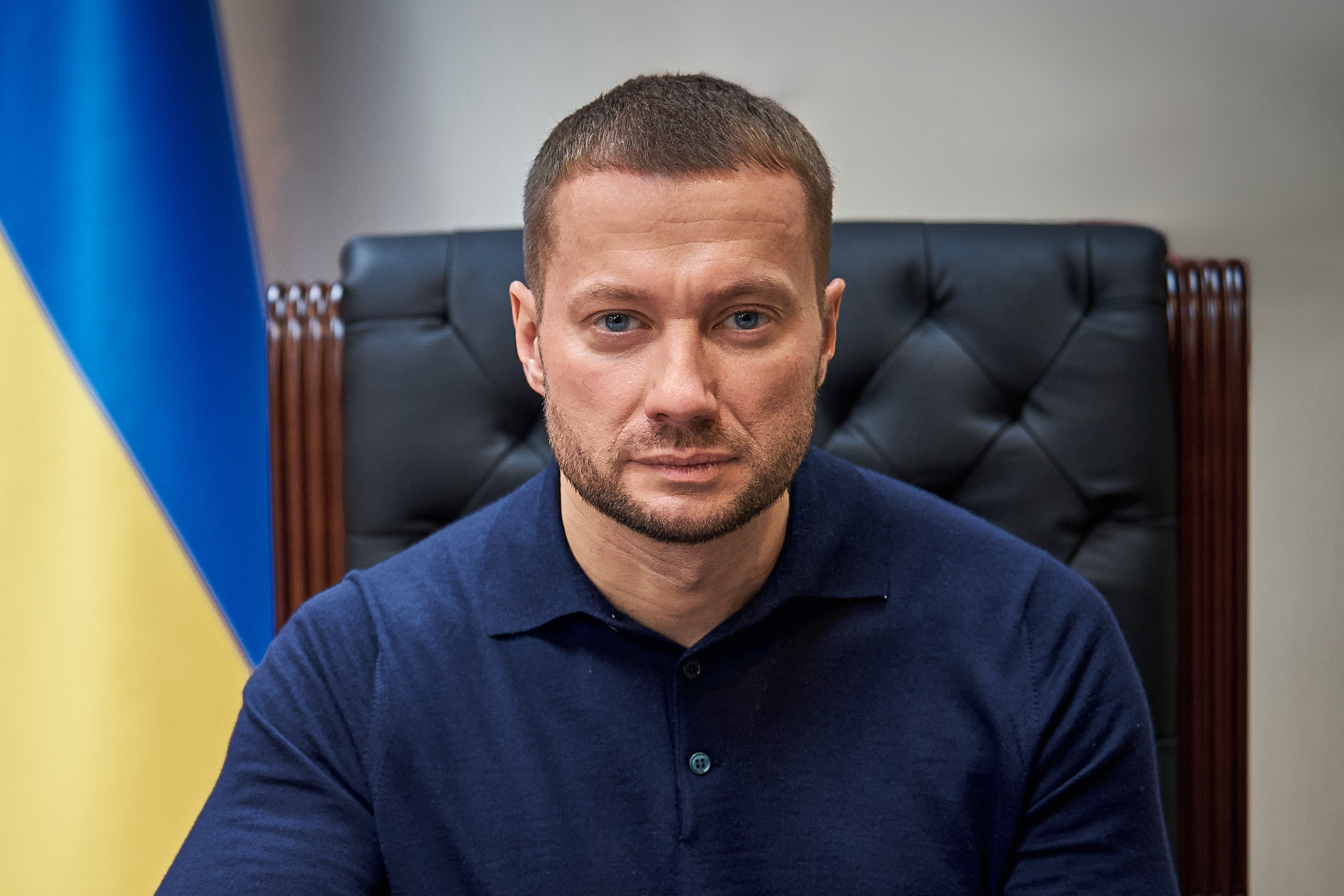
- Kyrylenko in 2023

Governor of Donetsk Oblast
- Disputed (Note: Control over Donetsk Oblast is disputed due to the Russo-Ukrainian War. Denis Pushilin was installed by Russia as Head of the Donetsk People's Republic, while Kyrylenko was loyal to the Ukrainian government.)
- In office 5 July 2019 – 5 September 2023
- President: Volodymyr Zelenskyy
- Prime Minister: Volodymyr Groysman; Oleksiy Honcharuk; Denys Shmyhal
- Preceded by: Oleksandr Kuts
- Succeeded by: Ihor Moroz (Acting)

Chairman of the Anti-Monopoly Committee
- Incumbent
- Assumed office 5 September 2023
- Preceded by: Olha Pishchanska

Personal details
- Born: Pavlo Oleksandrovych Kyrylenko; 5 May 1986 (age 40) Makiivka, Donetsk Oblast, Ukrainian SSR, Soviet Union
- Party: Independent
- Children: 2
- Education: Yaroslav Mudryi National Law University
- Occupation: prosecutor politician

Pavlo Oleksandrovych Kyrylenko (Ukrainian: Павло Олександрович Кириленко; born 5 May 1986) is a Ukrainian prosecutor and politician. He has served as head of the Ukrainian Anti-Monopoly Committee since September 2023.

Kyrylenko is a former Governor of Donetsk Oblast. Under martial law during the 2022 Russian invasion of Ukraine, Kyrylenko served as the Head of the Donetsk Regional Military Administration from July 2019 to September 2023.

== Biography ==
In 2008, he graduated from the Yaroslav Mudryi National Law University. In July 2008, he was employed at the Prosecutor's Office of Ukraine. From September 2017 to July 2019, Kyrylenko was the military prosecutor of the Uzhhorod garrison in the Western region.

Kyrylenko was appointed by Ukrainian President Volodymyr Zelenskyy as Governor of Donetsk Oblast on 5 July 2019. On 5 September 2023 he was relieved of this function.

On 6 September 2023 the Verkhovna Rada (the Ukrainian parliament) appointed Kyrylenko as the head of the Ukrainian Anti-Monopoly Committee.

Kyrylenko is a Lieutenant Colonel of Justice.

== Criminal proceedings ==
In March 2024 the Specialized Anti-Corruption Prosecutor's Office (SAPO) and National Anti-Corruption Bureau of Ukraine (NABU) initiated criminal proceedings against him under "illegal enrichment" and "declaration of false information" after an investigation found that his family had purchased real estate and car worth 70 million hryvnias, which he said was because of a start-up capital the family had founded. On 28 August, the High Anti-Corruption Court granted his request for the measure of constraint of bail worth 30 million hryvnias and to wear an electronic bracelet, dismissing the prosecutor's petition. In December 2024, NABU and SAPO completed their investigation, finding that the amount of illegal enrichment was more after collecting materials and transferred the case to the High Anti-Corruption Court. In March 2025 President Volodymyr Zelenskyy commented on the case, saying he would let the case go its pay and let the court pass a verdict, and that he would hold him accountable if the decision was against him.

== Personal life ==
Kyrylenko is married and has two children.
