= Keretsky =

Village in Zakarpattia Oblast, Ukraine

Coordinates: 48°28′50″N 23°13′10″E

Keretsky Керецьки
- Village
- Interactive map of Keretsky
- Country: Ukraine
- Oblast: Zakarpattia Oblast
- Raion: Khust Raion
- Hromada: Keretsky rural hromada
- Time zone: UTC+2 (EET)
  - Summer (DST): UTC+3 (EEST)

Keretsky (Ukrainian: Керецьки; Hungarian: Kerecke) is a village in Khust Raion, Zakarpattia Oblast. It is the administrative center of Keretsky rural hromada, one of the hromadas of Ukraine.

On 15 December 2023, the village was the site of the Keretsky grenade incident, in which a Ukrainian councilman detonated grenades at a meeting in the village. The resulting explosions killed one and injured 26.
