= Keretsky grenade incident =

2023 bombing of Ukrainian village council meeting

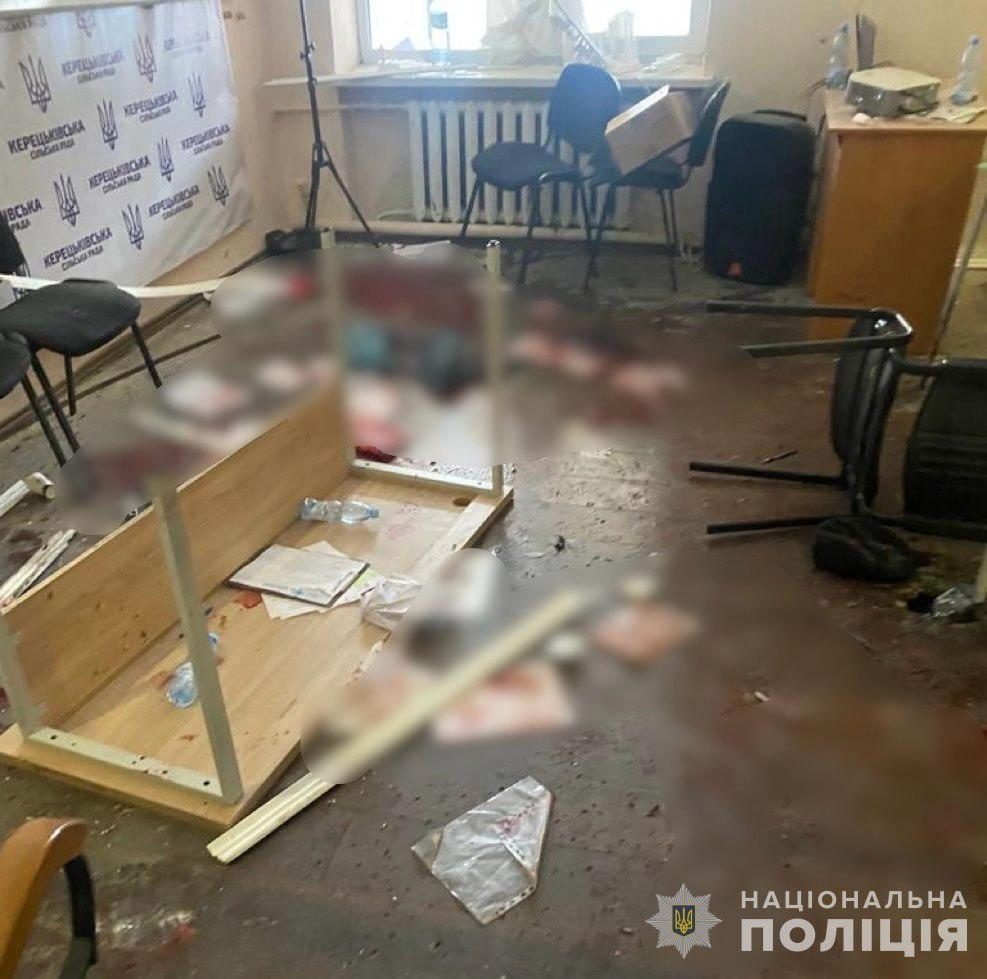
- Location: Keretsky, Zakarpattia Oblast, Ukraine
- Date: 15 December 2023 c. 11:37 a.m (UTC+2)
- Target: Village council members
- Weapons: Three RGD-5 and F-1 fragmentation grenades
- Deaths: 2
- Injuries: 25 (including the perpetrator)
- Perpetrator: Serhiy Batryn
- Motive: Dissatisfaction with council raising their own salaries
- Verdict: Guilty on all counts (Life Imprisonment)
- Convictions: Terrorism; Murder

On 15 December 2023, Serhiy Batryn, 54, a Ukrainian councilman, detonated three grenades at a meeting in the village of Keretsky, Zakarpattia Oblast, Ukraine. The resulting explosions killed one person and injured 26 others, six of them gravely. A second person died one month later as a result of the injuries.

== Perpetrator ==
Serhiy Batryn (born August 12, 1969) lived in the village of Kushnitsa at the time of the attack, Serhiy was also in the intensive care unit in the Svaliava hospital in life-threatening condition at the time of the attack, Serhiy's hospital ward was guarded by the police against lynching by relatives of those who were indoors at the time of the explosion.

== Aftermath ==
Batryn was later taken to an intensive care unit. A suicide note was found in Batryn's home. The event was live-streamed and posted on Facebook by the National Police of Ukraine. Batryn was sentenced to life imprisonment.
