= Ihor Moroz =

Ukrainian politician and economist

- Ігор Мороз
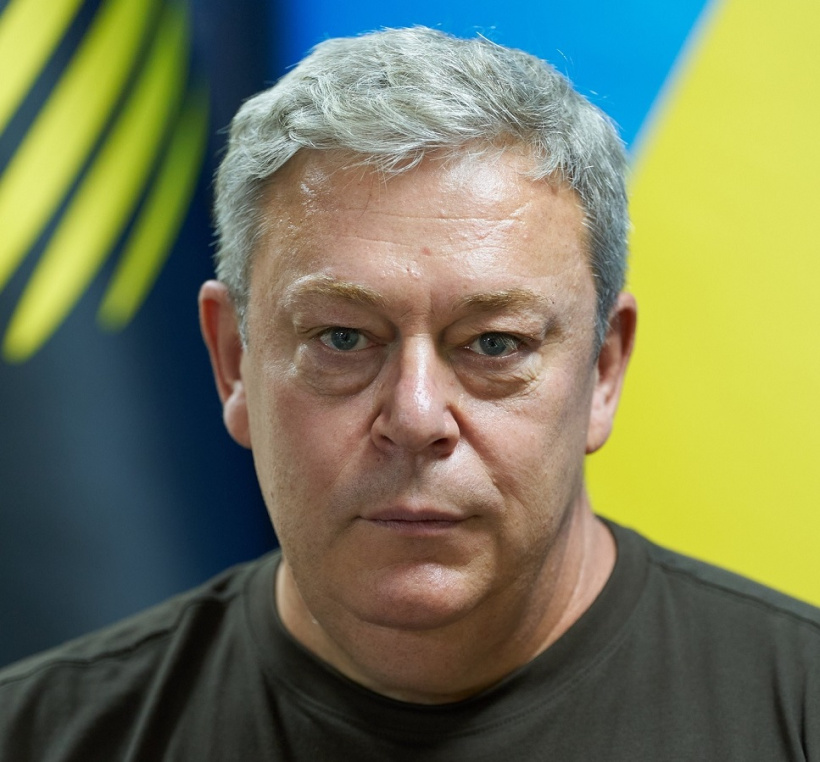

Acting Governor of Donetsk Oblast
- In office Disputed: 5 September – 27 December 2023 (Note: Control over Donetsk Oblast is disputed due to the Russo-Ukrainian War. Denis Pushilin was installed by Russia as Head of the Donetsk People's Republic, while Moroz was loyal to the Ukrainian government.)
- Preceded by: Pavlo Kyrylenko
- Succeeded by: Vadym Filashkin

Personal details
- Born: Ihor Viktorovych Moroz; 29 March 1970 (age 55) Kramatorsk, Ukrainian SSR, Soviet Union

Ihor Viktorovych Moroz (Ukrainian: Ігор Вікторович Мороз; born 29 March 1970) is a Ukrainian politician and economist, who was the acting governor of Donetsk Oblast in 2023.

Moroz had served as the First Deputy Head of the Donetsk Regional State Administration from 2019 to 2023.

== Biography ==
Moroz was born in Kramatorsk on 29 March 1970.

Moroz served in the military from August 1987 to August 1992. In 1991, he graduated from the Volks Higher Military Order of the Red Star of the Rear School of the Lenin Komsomol, majoring in "Command Tactical Food Supply" and qualified as an engineer-economist.

From September 1992 to August 1999, he worked in various positions in the tax service authorities in Kramatorsk, namely as: state tax inspector of the department of taxation of cooperative and public organizations; senior state tax inspector; senior state tax auditor-inspector of the department of audit of legal entities of the State Tax Inspectorate in the city of Kramatorsk; chief state tax inspector of the department of organization of control and documentary checks of business entities of the department of documentary checks of legal entities of the State Tax Administration in the city of Kramatorsk; chief state tax inspector of the department of document checks of legal entities of the department of document checks of legal entities; Chief State Tax Inspector of the Department of Organization of Audits of Large Enterprises and Economic Sectors of the Department of Documentary Audits of Legal Entities of the State Tax Inspectorate in the city of Kramatorsk.

From January 2001 to December 2003, he worked as the deputy director for commercial issues, the deputy director for financial issues of the Artemiv Experimental Machine-Building Plant in Bakhmut.

In December 2003, he returned to Kramatorsk and until October 2006 worked as the financial director of Minetek CJSC.

From October 2006 to April 2015, he worked in the following positions: deputy director for state supervision of the SE "Donetsk Regional Research and Production Center for Standardization, Metrology and Certification" (SE "Donetskstandartmetrologiya"); Deputy General Director for State Supervision; Deputy Chief State Inspector of Donetsk Oblast for State Supervision of Product Quality, Compliance with Standards, Norms and Rules, and State Metrological Supervision; First Deputy General Director of the State Enterprise "Donetsk Scientific and Industrial Center for Standardization, Metrology and Certification" in Donetsk.

In April 2015, he returned to work at SE "Donetskstandartmetrologiya" until September 2019.

On 17 September 2019, Moroz was appointed the first deputy head of the Donetsk regional military-civilian administration under the leadership of Pavlo Kyrylenko. From 5 September 2023, Moroz acting the head of the Donetsk regional military-civilian administration in connection with the dismissal and new appointment of the previous head. Vadym Filashkin was appointed new governor on 28 December 2023.
