= Volodymyr Shcherbyna =

Ukrainian politician (1935–2023)

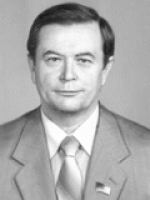

People's Deputy of Ukraine
- In office 15 May 1990 – 10 May 1994

Personal details
- Born: Volodymyr Oleksandrovych Shcherbyna; 3 February 1935 Makiivka, Stalino Oblast, Ukrainian SSR, USSR
- Died: 19 January 2023 (aged 87) Kharkiv, Ukraine
- Party: Democratic Party
- Education: National University of Kharkiv
- Occupation: Mathematician

Volodymyr Oleksandrovych Shcherbyna (Ukrainian: Володимир Олександрович Щербина; 3 February 1935 – 19 January 2023) was a Ukrainian mathematician and politician. A member of the Democratic Party, he served in the Verkhovna Rada from 1990 to 1994.

Shcherbyna died in Kharkiv on 19 January 2023, at the age of 87.
