= Khmelnytskyi National University =

Public university in Khmelnytskyi, Ukraine

Coordinates: 48.3042°N 38.0181°E

- Хмельницький національний університет
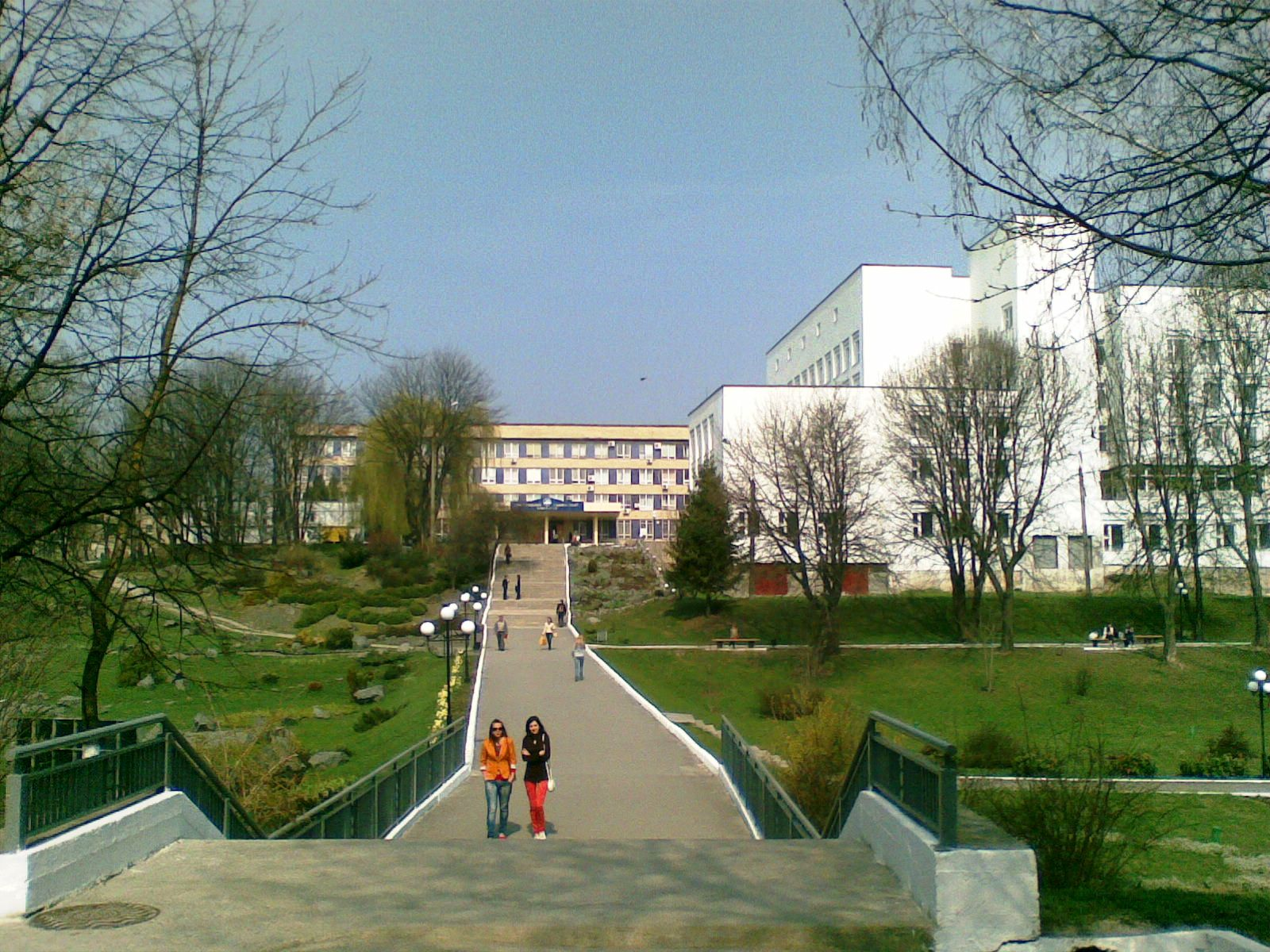
- Central alley of the Botanical Garden of Khmelnytsky National University
- Type: Public
- Established: 1962
- Affiliations: Ministry of Education and Science of Ukraine
- Rector: Mykola Skyba
- Students: 9,759
- Location: Khmelnytskyi, Ukraine
- Campus: Urban
- Website: khmnu.edu.ua/en/

The Khmelnytskyi National University is a Ukrainian state-sponsored university in Khmelnytskyi, Ukraine.

== History ==
Established in June 1962 with the development of a general-technical department of the Ukrainian Printing Institute, 250 students were accepted into the first year of evening courses and distance study. About 200 students were transferred from other higher educational establishments to upper courses of distance study.

In January 1966, the faculty was reorganized into the branch of the Ukrainian Printing Institute. Mechanical and General-technical faculties were functioning. 520 students were accepted to the first year of study, among them 90 full-time students. 30 more students were accepted to the second year of full-time study of Mechanical faculty.

In September 1967, the branch became an independent educational establishment - Khmelnytskyi Technological Institute of Domestic Services. 3 faculties: Mechanical, Technological and General-technical were functioning in the university. The general number of students reached 1500 people. 65 teachers and laboratory assistants worked in the 9 departments.

4 faculties were organized in the Institute in July 1969, including 2 general-technical: Khmelnytskyi and Kamianets-Podilskyi. M. Karpylenko was the rector of the institute from July 1969 until December 1974. During this time Preparatory Department and Engineering and economic faculty were opened. 5639 students were studying in different educational modes. 254 teachers worked in 21 departments, with 100 of them having academic degrees and titles.

In December 1974, under the guidance of Prof. R.Silin, Khmelnytskyi Technological Institute of Domestic Services was transformed to multidisciplinary institution of higher education.

In September 1989 the higher educational establishment received the status of the Khmelnitsky Technological Institute. In these years building №4, dormitories №4, 5, modern library, canteen, sports complex, research and experimental building of research sector, 2 living houses had been built, and construction of building № 5 had started. Such faculties, as Business and Law, Radio Electronics, and Faculty of the Work with Foreign Students were opened. The Institute trained specialists for 47 countries. There were Postgraduate and Doctorate studies at the Institute.

In October 1994– the institute was accredited for the IV level and received a status of Technological University of Podillya. The Faculty of Work with Foreign Students was reorganized into Pedagogical faculty. Specialists training within 8 new majors was conducted. More than 11,000 students studied at the university on 1.01.2002, 6400 of them were full-time students, and 1500 were students of pre-university and post-university training. Achievements of the Technological University of Podillya created the possibility of establishing a Mukachevo branch with two faculties: Engineering and Economics, Technology Faculty in 1995. Today it is Mukachevo State University.

By Instruction of the Cabinet of Ministers of Ukraine № 771, 17.12.2003 and Decree of the Ministry of Education and Science of Ukraine № 261, 26.12.2003, Technological University of Podillya was reorganized in Khmelnytskyi State University in 2003.

In 2004, by Decree of the President of Ukraine № 954/2004, 08.21.2004 and by Decree of the Ministry of Education and Science of Ukraine № 719, 13.09.2004, Khmelnytskyi State University was reorganized to become Khmelnytskyi National University.

== Campuses and buildings ==
There are 9 campus buildings and laboratories at the university, that occupy an area of 58 989 sq. m. The student quarter combines 5 dormitories and proposes 2 378 places.

== Institutes and faculties ==
There are 7 faculties and 46 departments in the university structure:

- Faculty of economics and administration
- Faculty of humanities and pedagogics
- Faculty of engineering mechanics
- Faculty of programming, computer and telecommunicational systems
- Faculty of technology and design
- Faculty of international relations
- Faculty of distance studies, pre-university and post-university training.

== Rectors ==
- Semen Ganzhurov: 1962–1969
- Mykhailo Karpylenko: 1969–1974
- Radomyr Silin: 1974–2001
- Mykola Skyba: since 2001

== See also ==
List of universities in Ukraine
