= Kostiantyn Tyshchenko =

Ukrainian linguist and philologist (1941–2023)

Kostiantyn Mykolaiovych Tyshchenko (Ukrainian: Костянтин Миколайович Тищенко; 30 July 1941 – 23 July 2023) was a Ukrainian linguist, teacher, translator, Doctor of Philology (1992), and professor (1995). Tyshchenko is the author of more than 240 works on metatheory of linguistics, sign theory of language, linguistic laws, optimization of morphological descriptions of languages, linguopedagogy, problems of language development, Romance and Oriental linguistics, as well as series of articles on studies of German, Slavic, Celtic, Basque, Finnish and Altaic languages. Teacher and polyglot speaking more than two dozen different languages. He lectures on general linguistics and conducts practical courses in French, Italian, Persian, Finnish, Basque, Welsh, and other languages. From 2001 to 2010, he was the head and leading researcher of the Linguistic Educational Museum, which he founded in 1992 at the Taras Shevchenko National University of Kyiv. Professor in the Middle East Department at the Taras Shevchenko National University of Kyiv (since 2011). Recipient of the Order of Merit of the Italian Republic (2003) and the Order of the White Rose of Finland (2005).

== Early life and education ==
Kostiantyn Tyshchenko was born in the family of architect Mykola Pavlovych Tyshchenko (1911-2004) and schoolteacher Anna Stepanovna Rybalko-Tyshchenko (1917-2002). He graduated from Kyiv Secondary School № 92 with a gold medal. After serving in the army, as a student capable of languages and science he was sent to teach at the Department of Romance Philology at the University of Kyiv.

Tyshchenko studied in a graduate school with professor Andrii Biletsky who noticed the scientific abilities and determination of his graduate student. In 1968, on Biletsky’s recommendation, Tyshchenko was assigned to lead a dialectological expedition at Taras Shevchenko National University of Kyiv to 5 cities on the Caucasian Black Sea coast. Then 10 volumes of dialectological materials were collected for the Linguistic Atlas of the Mediterranean. In 1970, Tyshchenko was elected a member of its editorial board for high professionalism and outstanding work on the materials from the Caucasus coast for this atlas, which was prepared by scientists from different countries.

A year earlier, in 1969, Tyshchenko had defended his dissertation The Verbal Paradigm of Romance Languages. Comparative and typological research.

== Career ==
Since graduating from the Taras Shevchenko University of Kyiv in 1963, with the exception of two years of military service, Tyshchenko has been working at this university at various departments: before starting his service at the army in the fall of 1963 - at the Department of Romance Philology, after demobilization - 6 years at the Department of General Linguistics and Classical Philology, then - 15 years at the Department of Theory and Practice of Translation (since 1975 - Associate Professor), then - again 8 years at the Department of Romance Philology.

After defending his doctoral dissertation Metatheory of Linguistics (1992), Tyshchenko accepted the rector's proposal to head the Department of Theory and Practice of Oriental Languages, later reorganized into the Department of Oriental Philology, which in 1995 separated from the Middle East. He was a Head of the department for 9 years. Since 2001, Tyshchenko has been the head and leading researcher of the Linguistic Educational Museum, which he founded in 1992.

== Research ==
=== Metatheory of linguistics ===
The main scientific achievement of Tyshchenko is the creation of a metatheory of linguistics. This concept became possible due to a theoretical rethinking of the relationship between the content of individual linguistic disciplines and blocks of linguistic knowledge in the system of a unified science of language. It was first briefly described by scientists as a large matrix in a key 1989 article. Linguistics became the first science for which metatheory was developed, which adequately reflects the mutual location and correlation of the accumulated knowledge about the system of world languages and their properties. The seven most general metapolies of linguistic knowledge (ethnopragmatics of language, axiopragmatics, idiopragmatics, syntactics, signification, genetic linguistics, evolutionary linguistics) and several subjectively conditioned concepts of the field of linguistics were singled out due to the nature of the object.

=== General linguistics ===
The elaboration of the metatheory of linguistics became possible through a parallel reflection on the general theoretical linguistic courses that Tyshchenko had previously taught for 25 years. After two years of military service (1963-1965) and after entering graduate school, at the invitation of Professor Andrii Biletsky and under his leadership Tyshchenko in 1965 began to teach theoretical courses in general linguistics and admission to linguistics for students of I and V years of study of the then Faculty of Philology and the Faculty of Foreign Languages of KSU. So far, for 42 years of teaching these disciplines professor Tyshchenko has taught more than 5 thousand students.

=== Romance studies ===
Philologist of Romance languages by education, Tyshchenko is the author of numerous publications in French, Italian, Portuguese and other Romance languages. He taught French and translation in 1963-1990. Tyshchenko published a number of his own literary translations from French, Portuguese, and Italian. In August 1998, he provided a Portuguese translation for the Ukrainian government delegation at the Expo '98 World Exhibition in Lisbon.

=== Italian studies ===
Tyshchenko made numerous researches in Italian studies. He is a founder and a President of the Dante Alighieri Language and Cultural Union in Kyiv (since 1994; Honorary President since 2002). Tyshchenko has been teaching Italian at the T. Shevchenko University of Kyiv for 35 years (since 1965) and at the courses of the Dante Alighieri Union in Kyiv (since 1994).

=== Slavic studies ===
Tyshchenko's research on Slavic languages is devoted to certain aspects of their teaching to foreigners and linguistic and cultural contacts of Slavs with their historical neighbors.

=== German studies ===
Several publications on German studies reflect certain aspects of Tyshchenko's scientific interests and are mainly related to linguistic and historical issues.

=== Celtology ===
The first Welsh language specialists in Ukraine were also trained at the Linguistic Museum founded by Tyshchenko. From the pedagogical cooperation with the Faculty of History in the 1990s grew a completely new special course Introduction to Celtology, developed for the first time in Ukraine for students who a year earlier enrolled in Tyshchenko’s optional practical course in Welsh.

=== Bascology ===
Tyshchenko advanced training in Basque in Donostia-San Sebastian and Vitoria-Gasteiz in 1991 and 1996. He trained the first specialists in Ukraine with practical knowledge of the Basque language.

=== Finnish Studies ===
Tyshchenko taught Finnish as an optional subject at the University of Kyiv from 1985. From 1995, the scientist cooperated with the Ukraine-Finland Society, with the support of which Tyshchenko first received official recognition from the Embassy of Finland to teach Finnish language a consolidation group of Kyiv students of Kyiv Politechnic Institute and Taras Shevchenko National University of Kyiv.

=== Iranian studies ===
In 1994, Tyshchenko became a leading researcher at the Institute of Oriental Studies, Deputy Chairman of the Doctoral Special Council. He regularly published articles on Iranian studies, annual reports at international oriental readings in Zvenyhorodka and Kyiv. In 1997 he represented the Ukrainian Oriental Studies at the 35th World Congress of Orientalists in Budapest. Tyshchenko was teaching Persian at the Taras Shevchenko National University of Kyiv, and soon headed the Department of Oriental Studies (now - the Department of Middle East, where he received the title of professor in 1995).

=== Arabic studies ===
Tyshchenko's publications on Arabic studies dealt mainly with historical aspects of Slavic-Arab contacts between the Persian period and later (the peak dates back to the years of the Arab-Khazar war of 710-737).

=== Altaic studies ===
Several articles by Tyshchenko are devoted mainly to the historical aspects of Slavic-Altaic contacts during the early Middle Ages and the period of migration.

=== Toponymic studies ===
This group of publications reflects the results of the application of a new promising method for the study of toponymic systems, developed by Tyshchenko over the years. At the 1st International Conference "Actual Problems of Ancient History" (Kyiv, 2007), the scientist presented this new method of toponymic context, the essence of which is to take into account semantic relationships between neighboring geographical names as members of the toponymic system. In order to promote the achievements of toponymy as an auxiliary historical discipline among high school students in collaboration with the Institute of Information Technology and Teaching Aids of the Academy of Pedagogical Sciences of Ukraine Tyshchenko and the museum created in 2007 educational film Language Gifts old neighbors. From Italians to Alans.

== Teaching activities ==
In 1988 and 1990 Tyshchenko was recognized as the winner of competitions for the best teacher of the then Ministry of Higher Education of the USSR. He received rave reviews abroad when he lectured on general linguistics at the University of Cracow in 1976, lectures on metatheory of linguistics at the University of the Basque Country (Spain) in 1991 and at the University of Granada in Granada in 1996. Tyshchenko has prepared 6 candidates of sciences. Taking care of a reliable factual language base for his theoretical courses, Tyshchenko is constantly engaged in self-education, advanced training in language courses in Italy, Spain, Iran and Finland. Tyshchenko was the first since 1965 to teach Italian at the Taras Shevchenko University of Kiev in optional groups, as well as Hindi, Swahili, Dutch, Portuguese, Polish, Belarusian and Ukrainian languages.

=== Experimental Romance groups ===
Tyshchenko co-initiated the creation in 1985 of experimental Romance groups (ERG), organized to study a number of methodological problems of language teaching. In addition to the main foreign language, students of these groups studied in parallel (until then it was considered impossible) four other Romance languages, for example, English - French, Italian, Spanish, Portuguese. Contrary to skeptics, dozens of students in these groups passed state exams in all of these languages in 1989 and 1991. These were also the first - and almost the only - open exams at the university.

== Linguistic educational museum ==
In 1992 Tyshchenko defended his doctoral dissertation Metatheory of Linguistics. The same year, he founded a conceptually new division of the university, the world's first Linguistic Educational Museum, which he still heads. He theoretically substantiated its structure and over the past decades, together with his students, prepared more than 300 large-format color displays of the current exposition of the museum. For 19 years of the museum's activity it was visited by more than 10 thousand tourists from 32 countries. The museum was recognized by the American Council of Learned Societies (ACLS) Award, unanimously awarded to it in 1999. In an official ACLS document, the Linguistic Museum is named "the finest of the intellectual leadership".

== Death ==
Tyshchenko died on 23 July 2023, at the age of 81.

== Awards and honors ==
- Winner of awards of the Ministry of Higher Education of the USSR in competitions of the best teachers (1988, 1990).
- American Council of Learned Societies (ACLS; 1999) Award for Leadership in the Humanities.
- The Order of Merit for the Italian Republic (Al merito della Repubblica Italiana; 2003) is an outstanding contribution to the study and dissemination of the Italian language and culture.
- Knight's Order of the First Degree of the White Rose of Finland (Suomen Valkoisen Ruusun ritarikunta, SVR; 2005) for many years of teaching the Finnish language in Kyiv and scientific achievements in Finnish studies.
- Honored Worker of Education of Ukraine (2008).
- Order of Merit, Ukraine III degree (2010).
- Award "For special services to the Taras Shevchenko National University of Kyiv" (2017).

== Selected publications ==
Metatheory of linguistics

- Program in the basics of linguistics. - Kyiv, 1973
- Metatheory of linguistics. - Kyiv, Osnovy, 2000.

General linguistics

- Program of the course "Fundamentals of Scientific Research". - Kyiv, 1991.
- Languages of Europe. Atlas-calendar 2001. - Kyiv, Lviv: Kalvaria.

Romance studies

- Atlante linguistico mediterraneo. - Firenze: Olschi, 1978 (co-author; 23 editions published since 1978)
- Ukrainian-French dictionary. - Irpin: Perun, 1994 (co-author).

Italian studies

- Educational frequency dictionary-minimum for students studying Italian. - Kyiv, 1969
- Italy and Ukraine: Millennial Ethnolinguistic Contacts. - Kyiv, Aquilon-Plus, 2009.

Slavic studies

- Frequency Ukrainian grammar. Preprint. - Lviv, 1989.
- Foreign language history of Ukrainians - Kyiv; Brody: Prosvita, 2018. - 816 p.

German studies

- Ethnolinguistic history of ancient Ukraine. - Kyiv, Aquilon-Plus, 2008. - 480 p.
- Caliphate and the North: Toponymic trace in Ukraine. - K .: Aquilon-Plus, 2011. - 496 p.

Celthology

- Toponymic traces of Celtic Scythian neighbors // VII Oriental readings of A. Krymsky. Abstracts of reports. - K., 2003. - P. 136.
- Celtic names of settlements at the sources of rivers of Ukraine // Folk art and ethnography. - 2003.

Bascology

- Basque experience of language construction // Lesson of Ukrainian. - 2000. - № 8.
- The longest linguistic and cultural tradition in Europe: the Basques // Sights of Ukraine . - 2003. - № 4.

Finnish studies

- Early Finnish borrowings from Indo-European languages // Ethnic history of the peoples of Europe. - Vip. 5. - K .: KNU, 2000.
- Linguistic evidence of the Proto-Finnish presence in Western Europe // Ethnic History of the Peoples of Europe. - Vip. 9. - K .: KNU, 2001.

Iranian studies

- Optimal morphology of the Persian verb // Bulletin of the KSU. Inoz. philology. - Vip. 25. - Kyiv, 1995.
- Lectures on linguistics for orientalists. - Кyiv, 1998.

Arabic studies

- Arab layer of toponymy of Ukraine VII-XIII centuries. - K., 2008.
- Foreign toponyms of Ukraine: Etymological dictionary-manual. - Ternopil, 2010.

Altaic studies

- Sorokovi Balchyky: Altai toponyms of Sumy region // Sivershchyna in the history of Ukraine. - Vip. 2. - K. – Glukhiv, 2009.
- Eastern world in Ukrainian toponymy (III. Altai world) // Eastern world. - 2009. - № 4.

Toponymic studies

- Elamite verb bases in toponymy of Ukraine. - Kyiv-Lviv, 2011. - 24 p.
- Keys from Asturias from the past of Ukraine . - K.-Drohobych: Posvit ", 2015. - 528 p.
