= Flyr (airline) =

Low-cost airline of Norway (2020–2023)

Flyr AS
IATA	ICAO	Call sign
FS	FOX	GREENSTAR
- Founded: 14 August 2020
- Commenced operations: 30 June 2021
- Ceased operations: 31 January 2023
- Operating bases: Oslo Airport, Gardermoen
- Headquarters: Oslo, Norway
- Key people: Brede Huser (CEO & CFO); Erik G. Braathen (Chairman)

Flyr AS (OSE: FLYR) was a short-lived Norwegian low-cost airline. Headquartered in Oslo with an operational base at Oslo Airport, Gardermoen, the airline operated flights within Norway and between Norway and European leisure destinations. Flyr ceased operations on 31 January 2023.

== History ==
=== Foundation ===
Flyr was founded by Erik G. Braathen in 2020, the former CEO of the now-defunct Norwegian carrier Braathens. The name Flyr is Norwegian for flying. In June 2021, Flyr was issued an air operator's certificate by the Civil Aviation Authority of Norway. The airline originally planned to operate up to 30 aircraft to domestic and European destinations, while selling tickets to passengers solely via their own mobile app. The first flight from Oslo to Tromsø was operated by a Boeing 737-800.

=== Financial difficulties ===
In October 2022, Flyr announced they would cut their winter schedule by half to save nearly 40 Million Euros due to significantly decreased demand. As of November 2022, the airline was in the process to acquire additional funds from investors stating that it otherwise cannot guarantee to maintain its future operations, it however failed to reach the requested sum during the first try. Flyr also stated it would lease at least one of their aircraft to another airline.

On 30 January 2023, Flyr announced that their alternative financial plan failed. The board of directors were looking for a new alternative way to finance the airline. However, on 1 February 2023 the airline went into administration and ceased all flights.

== Destinations ==
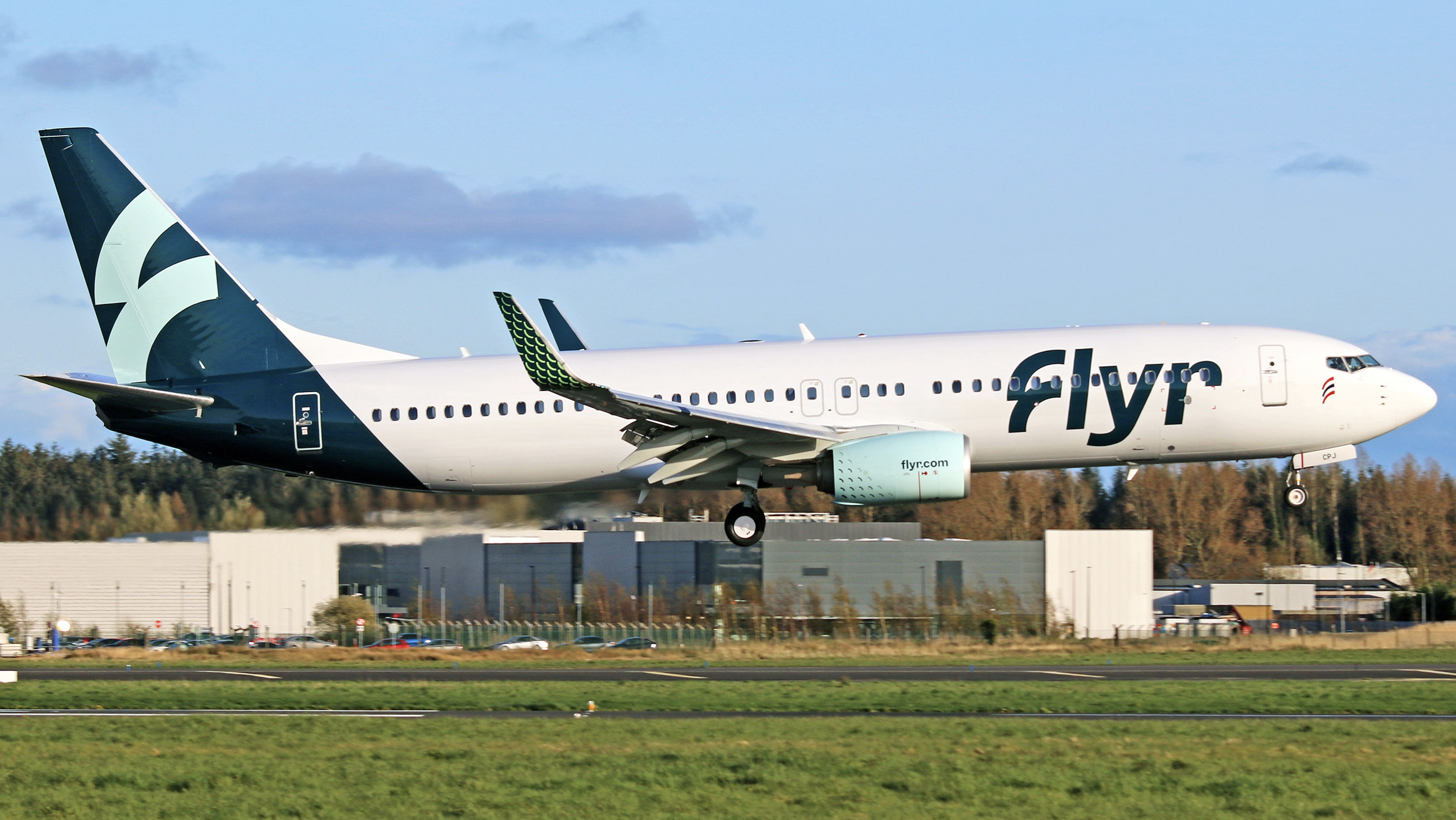
Flyr Boeing 737-800

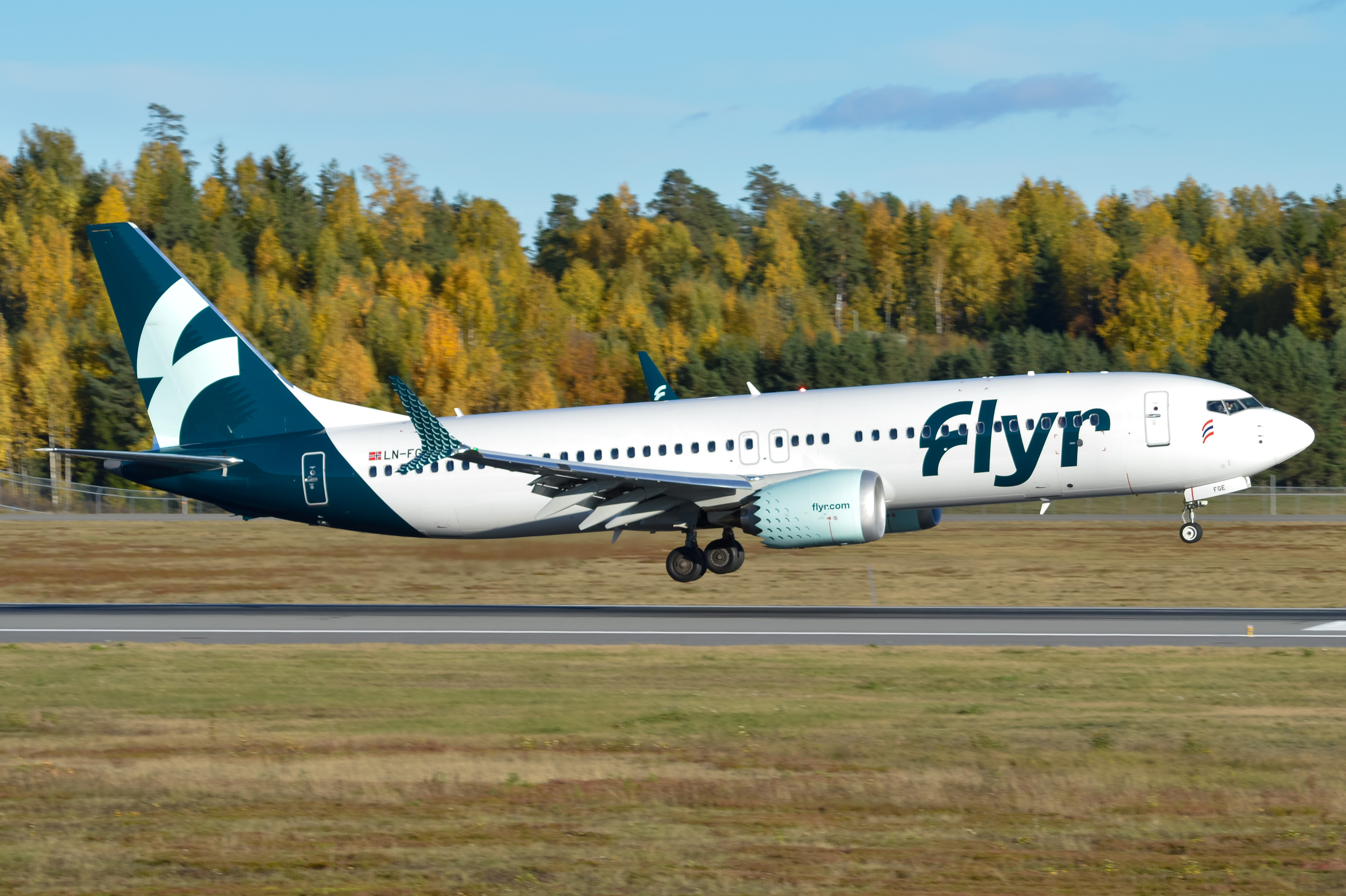
Flyr Boeing 737 MAX 8

As of January 2023, prior to the closure of operations, Flyr operated flights to the following destinations:

Country	City	Airport	Notes
Austria	Salzburg	Salzburg Airport	Seasonal
Belgium	Brussels	Brussels Airport	Terminated
Croatia	Zadar	Zadar Airport	Seasonal
Czech Republic	Prague	Václav Havel Airport Prague	Terminated
Denmark	Copenhagen	Copenhagen Airport	Terminated
Denmark	Billund	Billund Airport	Terminated
France	Grenoble	Alpes–Isère Airport	Terminated
France	Nice	Nice Côte d'Azur Airport	
France	Montpellier	Montpellier–Méditerranée Airport	Seasonal
France	Paris	Charles de Gaulle Airport	
Germany	Berlin	Berlin Brandenburg Airport	
Greece	Athens	Athens International Airport	Seasonal
Greece	Thessaloniki	Thessaloniki International Airport	Seasonal
Italy	Naples	Naples International Airport	Seasonal
Italy	Pisa	Pisa International Airport	Seasonal
Italy	Rome	Leonardo da Vinci–Fiumicino Airport	
Norway	Bergen	Bergen Airport	
Norway	Bodø	Bodø Airport	Terminated
Norway	Harstad/Narvik	Harstad/Narvik Airport, Evenes	Terminated
Norway	Oslo	Oslo Airport, Gardermoen	Base
Norway	Stavanger	Stavanger Airport	Terminated
Norway	Tromsø	Tromsø Airport	(First Flight)
Norway	Trondheim	Trondheim Airport	
Portugal	Faro	Faro Airport	Terminated
Portugal	Porto	Porto Airport	Seasonal
Spain	Alicante	Alicante–Elche Miguel Hernández Airport	Seasonal
Spain	Barcelona	Josep Tarradellas Barcelona–El Prat Airport	
Spain	Gran Canaria	Gran Canaria Airport	
Spain	Palma de Mallorca	Palma de Mallorca Airport	Seasonal
Spain	Málaga	Málaga-Costa del Sol Airport	
Sweden	Stockholm	Stockholm Arlanda Airport	
United Kingdom	Edinburgh	Edinburgh Airport	Terminated

== Fleet ==
As of December 2022, Flyr operated the following aircraft:

Aircraft	In service	Orders	Passengers	Notes
Boeing 737-800	6	—	189	
Boeing 737 MAX 8	6	—	189	Option held for 4 additional aircraft.
Total	12	—		
