= Committees of the Verkhovna Rada =

Parliamentary committee of Ukraine

Committees of the Verkhovna Rada (Ukrainian: Комітети Верховної Ради України, romanized: Komitety Verkhovnoi Rady Ukrainy) are the Verkhovna Rada (the parliament of Ukraine) legislative panels of experts that work for implementation of legislation in specialized fields, preparation and preliminary review of issues attributed to authority of as well as performing control functions.

The parliament of Ukraine adopts certain number of committees at each new convocation as well as their names and competence. It also establishes the maximum number of individuals that may be part of each individual committee. Until 1997 committees of the Supreme Council of Ukraine were known as permanent commissions.

Over the years the number of committees varied between 23 and 29. The biggest committees are the Committee on Taxation and Customs Policy, Budget Committee and the Committee of Agrarian Policy and Land Relations.

The Rada establishes parliamentary committees. On 4 December 2014, parliament formed 27 committees and 2 special control commissions. The previous parliament (2012–2014) had 29 committees and an ad hoc supervisory board. The sixth session of the Rada (2007–2012) had 28 committees, including the Budget Committee, the Special Control Commission of the Verkhovna Rada on Privatization, and the Committee on Transportation and Communications. There are no permanent or standing committees, though committees from previous convocations may be re-formed. Among the most important is the Budget Committee.

== Formation ==
The personal composition of committees is formed the Verkhovna Rada of new convocation (i.a.w. after an election) by electing chairmen, first deputies, chairmen deputies, secretaries and members of the committees. Election of the People's Deputy of Ukraine to a committee takes place based on propositions of parliamentary factions registered in compliance with quotas defined by the parliamentary regulations (Regulations of the Verkhovna Rada). If the number of parliamentary faction's members of Verkhovna Rada is equal to the number of committees or is bigger than the number of committees the parliamentary factions send no less than one representative to each committee of the Supreme Council of Ukraine.

Chairmen, first deputies, chairmen deputies and secretary of committees cannot be at same time leaders of parliamentary factions. Chairman, their first deputy and secretary of committees cannot be members of a single faction. The chairman of the parliament, their first deputy and deputy cannot be elected to the committees.
