= Bohdan Rebryk =

Ukrainian political prisoner and politician (1938–2023)

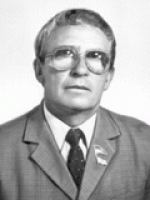

People's Deputy of Ukraine
- In office 15 May 1990 – 10 May 1994

Personal details
- Born: Bohdan Vasyliovych Rebryk; 30 July 1938 Pawełcze, Stanisławów Voivodeship, Poland
- Died: 1 January 2023 (aged 84) Ivano-Frankivsk, Ukraine
- Party: Ukrainian Republican Party

Bohdan Vasyliovych Rebryk (Ukrainian: Богдан Васильович Ребрик; 30 July 1938 – 1 January 2023) was a Ukrainian politician. A member of the Ukrainian Republican Party, he served in the Verkhovna Rada from 1990 to 1994.

Rebryk died in Ivano-Frankivsk on 1 January 2023, at the age of 84.
