= 2023 Brovary helicopter crash =

Transport disaster in Kyiv Oblast, Ukraine

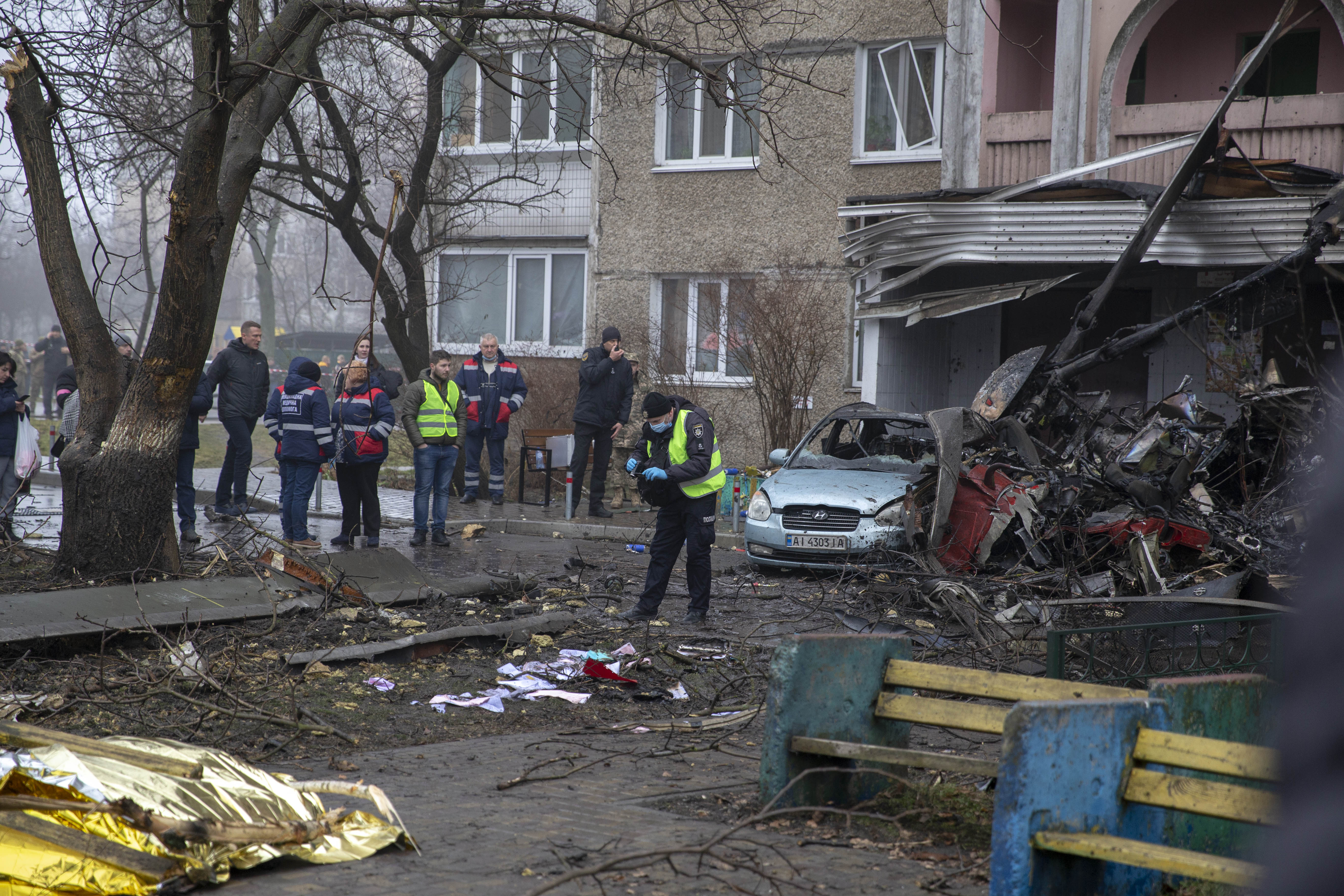
- Helicopter crash site

Accident
- Date: 18 January 2023
- Summary: Helicopter crash, under investigation
- Site: Brovary, Kyiv Oblast, Ukraine; 50°31′13″N 30°48′04″E
- Total fatalities: 14
- Total injuries: 25

Aircraft
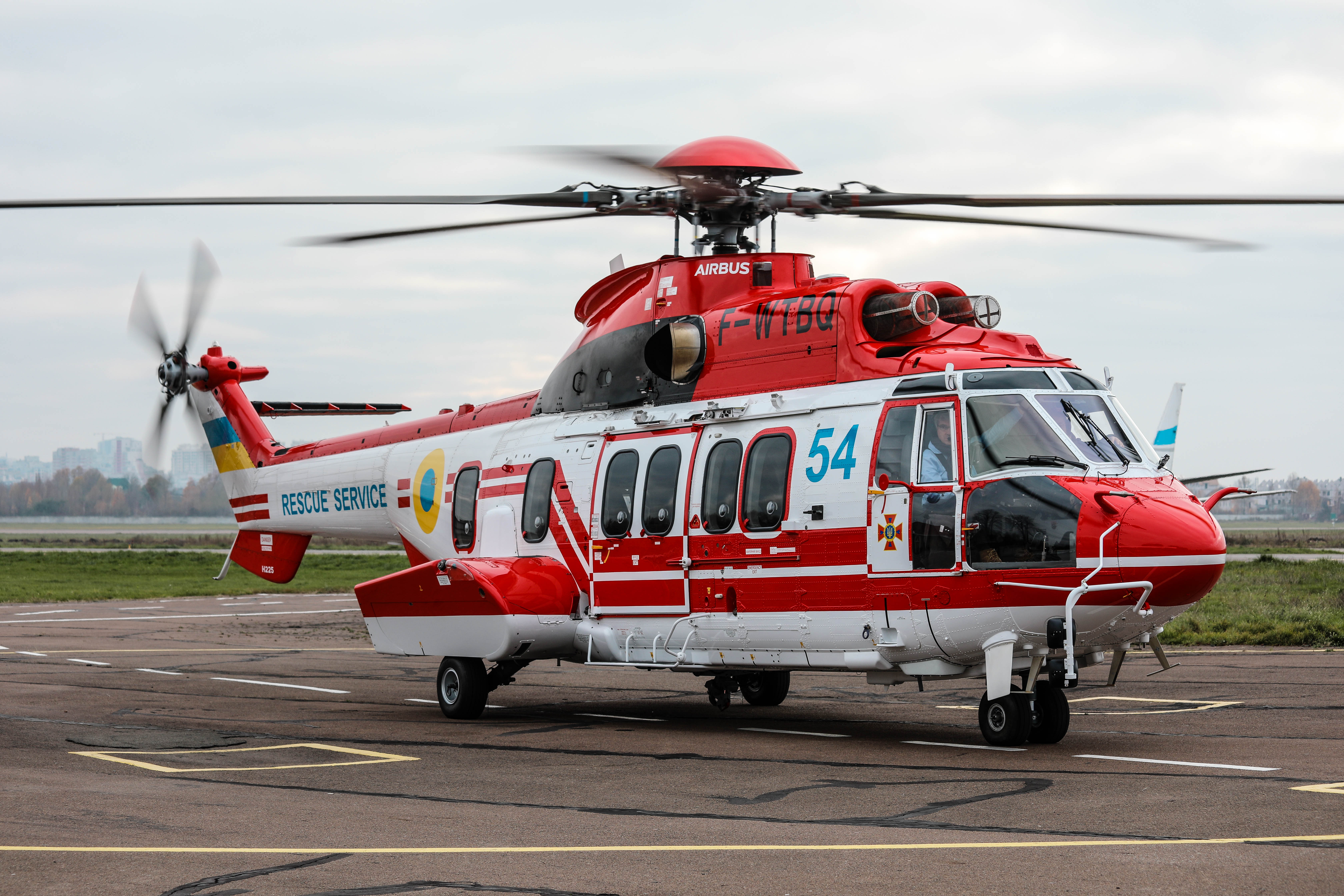
- The helicopter involved (November 2020)
- Aircraft type: Eurocopter EC225 Super Puma
- Operator: State Emergency Service of Ukraine
- Registration: F-WTBQ
- Occupants: 10
- Fatalities: 10
- Survivors: 0

Ground casualties
- Ground fatalities: 4
- Ground injuries: 25

On 18 January 2023, a Ukrainian Eurocopter EC225 Super Puma carrying ten people, including Ukrainian Minister of Internal Affairs Denys Monastyrsky, his deputy Yevhen Yenin, and State Secretary Yurii Lubkovych, crashed into a kindergarten in Brovary, a suburb of Kyiv, Ukraine. The crash killed fourteen people, including Monastyrsky, Yenin, and Lubkovych. Four of the victims were killed on the ground, including one child. Twenty-five other people were injured on the ground, including eleven children.

== Crash ==
Video taken at the crash scene

According to Kyrylo Tymoshenko, deputy head of the Office of the President of Ukraine, the officials onboard had been traveling to a combat zone when the helicopter plunged to the ground at 08:20 EET. Eyewitnesses described foggy conditions at the time of the crash, and some reported seeing the helicopter on fire, spinning with its pylon and tail rotor missing, and circling before it hit the ground. The helicopter came to rest against a local kindergarten, resulting in a fire that charred the side of the building. Search and rescue efforts ended later that day, after nearly nine hours.

Twenty-five people on the ground were taken to Brovary City Hospital, of whom eight were later transferred to a specialized burn unit in Kyiv. Though none were in critical condition, the Ministry of Health later announced that six of the patients would be sent abroad for further treatment.

== Aircraft ==
The helicopter involved in the crash was a Eurocopter EC225 Super Puma, also known as Airbus H225, with identification number 54. It belonged to the Ukrainian State Emergency Service and was one of the 21 model H225 helicopters delivered by France between 2018 and 2021, as part of a program to modernize Ukraine's aging Soviet aircraft fleet. Nearly half of the delivered aircraft were used, with some of the parts having a wear rate of 50%, but they were refurbished before being put into operation.

== Passengers and crew ==
Seven passengers and three crew members were aboard the helicopter when it crashed. All seven passengers were employees of the Interior Ministry, including Interior Minister Denys Monastyrsky, his deputy Yevhen Yenin, State Secretary Yurii Lubkovych, and Monastyrsky's security chief. The aircraft was commanded by Oleksandr Vasylenko, assisted by his co-pilot Kostiantyn Kovalenko and flight mechanic Ivan Kasianov. According to the State Emergency Service, the crew was trained to perform tasks under difficult conditions.

== Investigation ==
There was no indication that the crash was anything other than an accident, although officials gave no immediate account of the cause of the crash. In an address following the incident, President Zelenskyy said he had asked the SBU state security service to launch a criminal probe into the cause. Several possible causes are under investigation, including a breach of flight rules, technical malfunction, and intentional destruction or sabotage of the helicopter.

Yurii Ihnat, spokesperson of the Ukrainian Air Force, announced that the incident would also be investigated by a special state commission, a probe expected to take at least several weeks.

On 3 August, the State Bureau of Investigation of Ukraine announced that five State Emergency Service employees had been charged with safety violations and negligence regarding the crash, namely the head of the service's Department of Aviation and Air Search and Rescue, its acting commander, the commander of the aviation squadron, the deputy commander for flight training, and the head of the flight safety service of the Special aviation unit from Nizhyn, Chernihiv Oblast.

== Reactions ==
The government appointed Ihor Klymenko, chief of the National Police of Ukraine, as acting interior minister until a new interior minister is appointed, he was later retained as the permanent interior minister.

Many Ukrainian, European, and American officials paid tributes to the victims and expressed condolences, including Ukrainian president Volodymyr Zelenskyy, Ukrainian prime minister Denys Shmyhal, Ukrainian foreign minister Dmytro Kuleba, Ukrainian parliament chairman Ruslan Stefanchuk, European Council President Charles Michel, U.S. President Joe Biden, U.S. ambassador to Ukraine Bridget A. Brink, and UK ambassador to Ukraine Melinda Simmons.
