= Yevhen Yenin =

Ukrainian diplomat (1980–2023)

- Євген Єнін
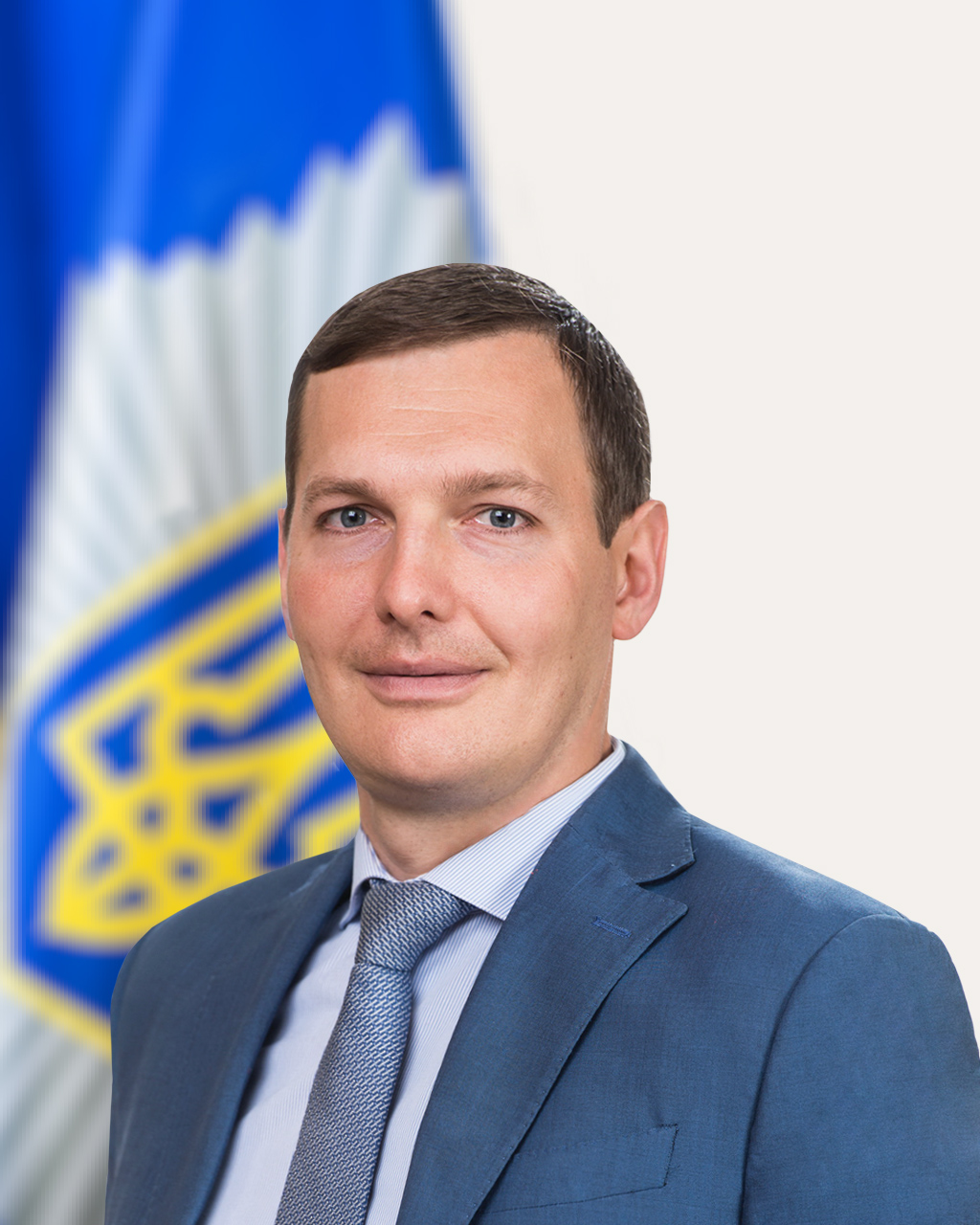
- Yenin in 2021
- Born: 19 November 1980; Dnipropetrovsk, Ukrainian SSR, Soviet Union
- Died: 18 January 2023 (aged 42); Brovary, Kyiv Oblast, Ukraine
- Cause of death: Helicopter crash
- Education: National Academy of the Security Service of Ukraine
- Occupations: Diplomat, Lawyer
- Awards: Order for Merit of the Third Rank

Yevhen Volodymyrovych Yenin (Ukrainian: Євген Володимирович Єнін, sometimes Yevheniy, Євгеній; 19 November 1980 – 18 January 2023) was a Ukrainian diplomat and lawyer who served as the Deputy Minister of Internal Affairs from 2021 until his death in a helicopter crash in 2023.

Yenin also served as Deputy Prosecutor General of Ukraine (international legal cooperation) 2016–2019 and as Deputy Minister of Foreign Affairs of Ukraine (2020–2021).

== Early life and education ==
Yenin was born on 19 November 1980 in Dnipro (then named Dnipropetrovsk), Ukrainian SSR, Soviet Union (now Ukraine). He graduated from the National Academy of the Security Service of Ukraine in 2002. In 2012 he also graduated from the State university of finance and international trade. He held a Ph.D. in political science on Transnistrian settlement. Besides his native Ukrainian and Russian, Yenin was also fluent in English, Romanian and Italian.

== Professional career ==
From 2002 until 2005, Yenin was an Operative in the Security Service of Ukraine and the Foreign Intelligence Service of Ukraine. From 2005 until 2009, he was responsible for Transnistrian settlement, the Embassy of Ukraine to Moldova. From 2010 until 2012, he was Head of unit for Romania, Moldova and the Balkans, the Ministry of Foreign Affairs of Ukraine. From 2012 until 2016, he worked as Deputy chief of mission, Counselor, Minister-Counselor, the Embassy of Ukraine to the Italian Republic.

From 2016 until 2019, Yenin served as Deputy Prosecutor General of Ukraine (international legal cooperation).

From July 2019 until April 2020, Yenin held the office of deputy executive director, Ukrainian Institute for the Future, Expert-Consultant to the Standing Committee of the Verhovna Rada (the parliament of Ukraine) on law enforcement activity.

On 21 May 2020, Yenin was appointed the Agent of Ukraine in Dispute Concerning the Detention of Ukrainian Naval Vessels and Servicemen (Ukraine v. the Russian Federation).

== Deputy Foreign Minister of Ukraine ==
Yenin was appointed Deputy Minister of Foreign Affairs of Ukraine on 15 April 2020. In the Foreign Ministry was in charge of Ukraine's policy in Asia. He represented Ukraine in international disputes against the Russian Federation and negotiations with Iran over the downing of the plane PS 752. Member of the Commission under the President of Ukraine on Citizenship.

On 31 August 2021, he was dismissed as Deputy Minister of Foreign Affairs, in anticipation of his appointment as First Deputy Interior Minister of Ukraine.

== First Deputy Interior Minister of Ukraine ==
On 6 September 2021, Yenin was appointed First Deputy Minister of Internal Affairs under Interior Minister Denys Monastyrsky.

== Death ==
Yevhen, along with the Minister of Interior, Denys Monastyrsky, and Secretary of State of the Ministry of Internal Affairs Yurii Lubkovych, were killed in a helicopter crash on 18 January 2023 in Brovary, an eastern suburb of the capital Kyiv. The helicopter hit a kindergarten as it crashed, and a child was among the 14 killed. At least 25 others were injured.

In April 2024 the city of Kharkiv renamed Bakulina Street in Yenin's honour.

== Recognition ==
- Order for Merit, third class (2017)
