= Yurii Lubkovych =

Ukrainian diplomat (1989–2023)

- Юрій Лубкович
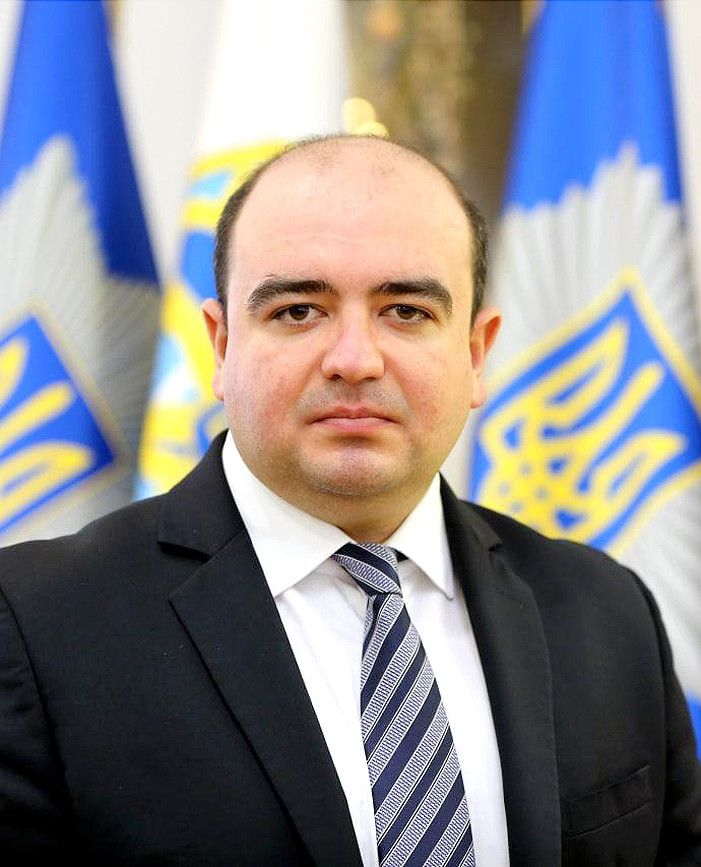
- Born: Yurii Olehovych Lubkovych; 31 May 1989; Ternopil, Ukrainian SSR, Soviet Union
- Died: 18 January 2023 (aged 33); Brovary, Kyiv Oblast, Ukraine
- Cause of death: Helicopter crash
- Education: Erasmus University Rotterdam; West Ukrainian National University
- Occupation: Diplomat
- Notable work: Served as the Secretary of State of the Ministry of Internal Affairs (2021–2023)

Yurii Olehovych Lubkovych (Ukrainian: Юрій Олегович Лубкович; 31 May 1989 – 18 January 2023) was a Ukrainian diplomat who served as the Secretary of State of the Ministry of Internal Affairs from 2021 until his death in 2023.

== Biography ==
Lubkovych graduated from the Erasmus University Rotterdam in the Netherlands in 2010 (majoring in business). He studied at West Ukrainian National University where he received his bachelor's degree in management in 2010, and his master's degree in management of foreign economic activities in 2011.

He held civil service positions for 10 years. He had experience in management positions in the Secretariat of the Cabinet of Ministers of Ukraine and the Apparatus of the Verkhovna Rada.

Lubkovych also attended special training courses for public managers at the Secretariat of the Government of Canada and Nanyang Technological University in Singapore.

== Death ==
Lubkovych, along with the Minister of Interior, Denys Monastyrsky and Deputy Minister of Internal Affairs Yevhen Yenin, was killed in a helicopter crash on 18 January 2023 in Brovary, an eastern suburb of the capital Kyiv. The helicopter hit a kindergarten as it crashed, and a child was among the 14 killed. 25 others were injured.
