= Etnodim =

Ukrainian Vyshyvanka company

Etnodim is a Ukrainian company specializing in the production and sale of vyshyvankas, shirts which feature traditional Ukrainian embroidery.

== History ==
The company was founded by Andriy Cherukha in 2009, while he was still a student of cultural studies at the National University of Ostroh Academy. While studying in his second year, he and a friend created an online store selling handmade embroidery from craftsmen from Western Ukraine. The initial budget of the project was 1,000 hryvnias, with 200 hryvnias spent on promoting the site. At first, the company had only two employees: a programmer and Andriy Cherukha himself, who worked as a manager and courier.

During the first week of the company’s operation, four embroidered shirts were sold. Two months after the website was launched, the programmer left the business, and Andriy was left to develop the business on his own. Six months later, the entrepreneur borrowed several thousand hryvnias from his parents to expand the range of embroidered shirts. The investment allowed the young businessman to increase his profits, which he reinvested in the product to increase the range. By the end of the first year of the website’s existence, customers were ordering up to ten shirts a week.

After graduating from university, Andriy Cherukha moved the company to Kyiv, which allowed him to double his profits. Within a year, Etnodim managed to open a showroom and increase the number of employees. After the company expanded in 2012, its own workshop was opened and Etnodim began producing its own clothing collections, and then embroidery and sewing workshops were opened. The company began to produce not only embroidered clothes, but also household goods, home textiles, and footwear.

In 2016, there was an attempt to open a store in Dnipro, which later had to be closed due to unprofitability.

On the eve of Ukraine's Independence Day in 2016, the company launched a campaign that offered a free embroidered shirt for a certain number of "likes" on a repost of their ETNODIM post on Facebook. The company did not expect such a huge stir, and within a few days it had to give away over 650 embroidered shirts. Etnodim fulfilled its promise and donated clothes to all participants who fulfilled the terms of the campaign. In order to process all requests from participants and contact the winners of the competition, the company hired an additional six people. Thus, the Etnodim brand donated goods worth more than a million hryvnias.

In 2016, Etnodim did a promotional photoshoot in New York City, starring African-American model Roxy Monroe.

By 2018, Etnodim had about 35 employees.

Since the first day of the 2022 Russian invasion, Etnodim has collectively raised over 1 million hryvnias to help the army. In 2023, Cherukha stated that sales had tripled that year compared with the last, driven in part by a rise in Ukrainian patriotism.

== Products ==
Etnodim is a manufacturer and seller of modern embroidered shirts with a national flavor. The company also produces hoodies, T-shirts, dresses, coats, bathrobes, pajamas, shoes and linen bed linen. In addition, the company's assortment includes handmade embroidered shirts from craftsmen from Western Ukraine.

Linen and plain satin fabric are used for bedding sets. Since Ukraine does not produce the necessary fabric for the work, the company purchases it from Belarus and European countries.

For Vyshyvanka Day, the brand developed an exclusive embroidered shirt with a trident for the President of Ukraine Volodymyr Zelenskyy.

Up to 90% of the company's sales are made through an online store. Foreign buyers account for 5-10% of all sales.
