= Constitution Day (Ukraine) =

Public holiday in Ukraine on 28 June

Constitution Day День Конституції
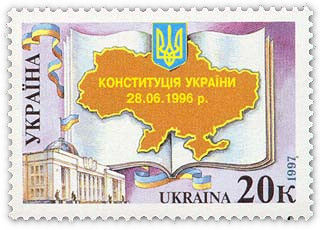
- Stamp of Ukraine commemorating the holiday
- Observed by: Ukraine
- Type: National
- Significance: The anniversary of the signing of the Ukrainian constitution of 1996
- Celebrations: Speeches by politicians
- Date: 28 June
- Next time: 28 June 2027
- Frequency: annual

Constitution Day (Ukrainian: День Конституції, romanized: Den Konstytutsii) is a Ukrainian public holiday celebrated on 28 June since 1996. It commemorates the anniversary of the approval by the Verkhovna Rada of the Constitution of Ukraine on 28 June 1996.

== History ==
51 hours after taking office as President of Ukraine, after winning the 1994 Ukrainian presidential election, Leonid Kuchma created the Constitutional Commission, which led to the adoption of a constitution of Ukraine in 1996. (At the time the 1978 Constitution of the Ukrainian Soviet Socialist Republic was in force in Ukraine.) The Constitution was adopted by the Verkhovna Rada at 9:20 am on 28 June 1996 after deputies had worked all day and all night on the project, remaining in the session hall without breaks. 315 people's deputies, out of a needed 300, voted for the adoption of the Basic Law. Constitution Day did become a public holiday in Ukraine because its foundation was enshrined in the constitution itself (it is the only public holiday that is mentioned in the constitution). Soviet Constitution day (7 October) was never observed in the Ukrainian SSR (the predecessor of modern Ukraine).

In the 2000s, most Ukrainians did not see Constitution Day as a holiday, but as an ordinary day off; about 10% believed it should be a working day (12% in 2008; this number had shrunk from 14% in 2003). Only in Western Ukraine was the holiday among the list of most respected holidays in Ukraine.

In the 2010s, the popularity of the holiday hovered around 5% according to research by the Kyiv International Institute of Sociology (KIIS).

The Russian invasion of Ukraine that started on 24 February 2022 led to a reappraisal of this and other public holidays in Ukraine. A March 2024 study by KIIS found that the popularity of Independence Day of Ukraine and Defenders Day had both almost more than doubled (from 37% to 64% and from 29% to 58%). Constitution Day did not nearly reach those figures: but it did became twice as popular, from 14% in 2021 to 29% in 2023 and in (an opinion poll held in February) 2024 28% of KIIS respondents labelled the holiday "most important or favorite".
