= Vita Kin =

Ukrainian fashion designer (born 1969)

- Віта Кін
- Born: Vita Kin; 25 November 1969 (age 56); Kyiv, Ukrainian SSR, Soviet Union
- Citizenship: Ukrainian
- Occupations: fashion designer, photographer
- Notable work: embroidered dresses
- Style: boho style
- Spouse: Roman Kindrachuk
- Awards: Best Fashion Awards; Elle Style Awards
- Website: www.vitakin.com

Vita Kin (Ukrainian: Віта Кін; born 25 November 1969) is a Ukrainian fashion designer. She is the founder of the Vita Kin brand.

== Biography ==
Kin was born in Kyiv, Ukraine. She has worked in advertising and fashion photography since 2010.

In 2008, Kin launched her own clothing brand Vita Kin for Kingdom, which specialized in dresses. In 2013, she created the Vyshyvanka by Vita Kin brand, which is based on outfits inspired by the Ukrainian national costume, vyshyvanka. The first collections were released under the motto "Chic Nationale".

During Paris Fashion Week 2015, her work was featured in Vogue magazine and in Harper's Bazaar.

Also in 2015, The Wall Street Journal named embroidered shirts from Vita Kin the most popular summer dresses of 2015. In September, Kin was named "Best Newcomer of 2015" at the Best Fashion Awards. In November 2015, Kin was named “Best Womenswear Designer in Ukraine” at the Elle Style Awards.

In February 2018, Kin was included in the Top 20 Ukrainian innovators according to Focus magazine.

In the spring of 2018, Vita Kin presented a joint collection with the Eres brand. In December 2019, Kin collaborated with Amanda Brooks, to create a collection of table linens.

After the Russian invasion of Ukraine in February 2022, the French fashion magazine L'Officiel quoted Kin as calling out:

“Dear friends, partners, followers from all around the world… We are bravely fighting for our freedom and for freedom in the entire world... Many are asking how they can help. I ask you: give us your attention and energy in social media. Ukrainians are fighting for all of you. Everyone who is posting fashion, travel, food, animals… Please be with us. Inspire us and goodwill triumph!" Your Vita Kin and 40 million Ukrainians.

=== Personal life ===
In 1999, Kin married Roman Kindrachuk, co-owner of Radioaktive Film production.
