= Navy Day =

Day to celebrate the naval forces in some countries

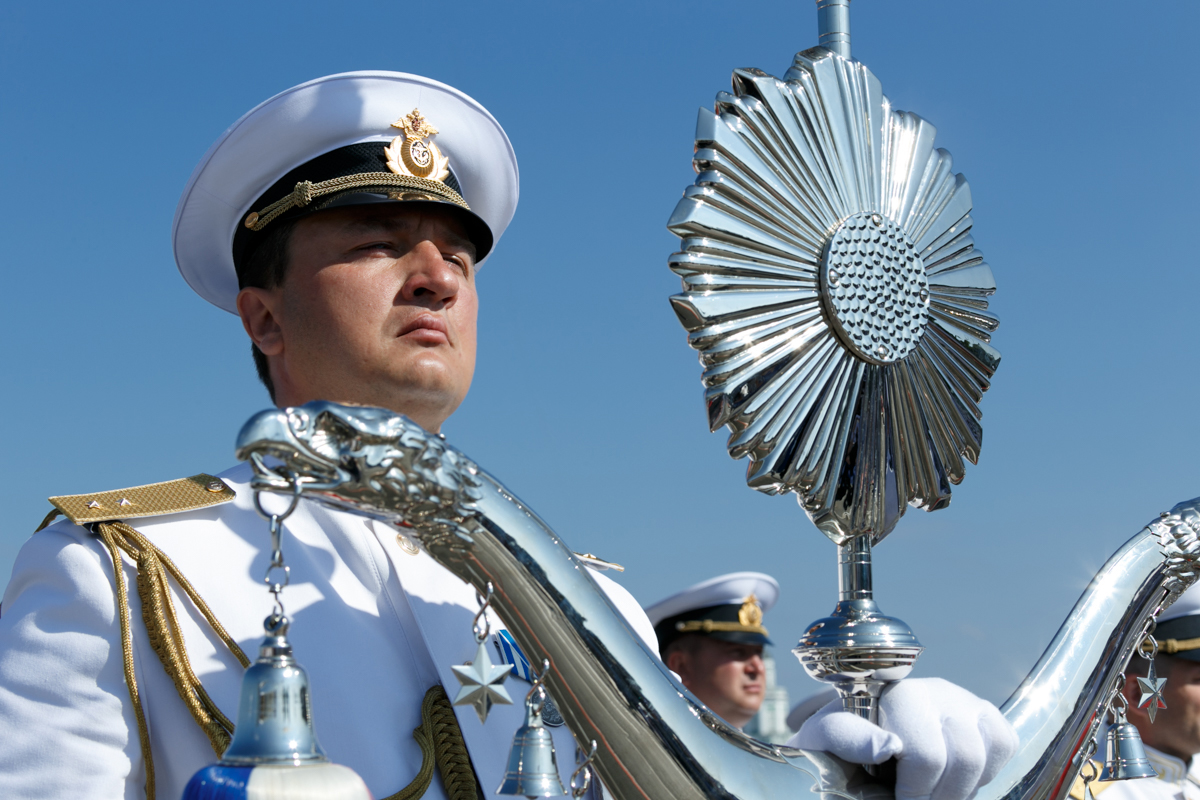
A Russian sailor on Navy Day in 2017.

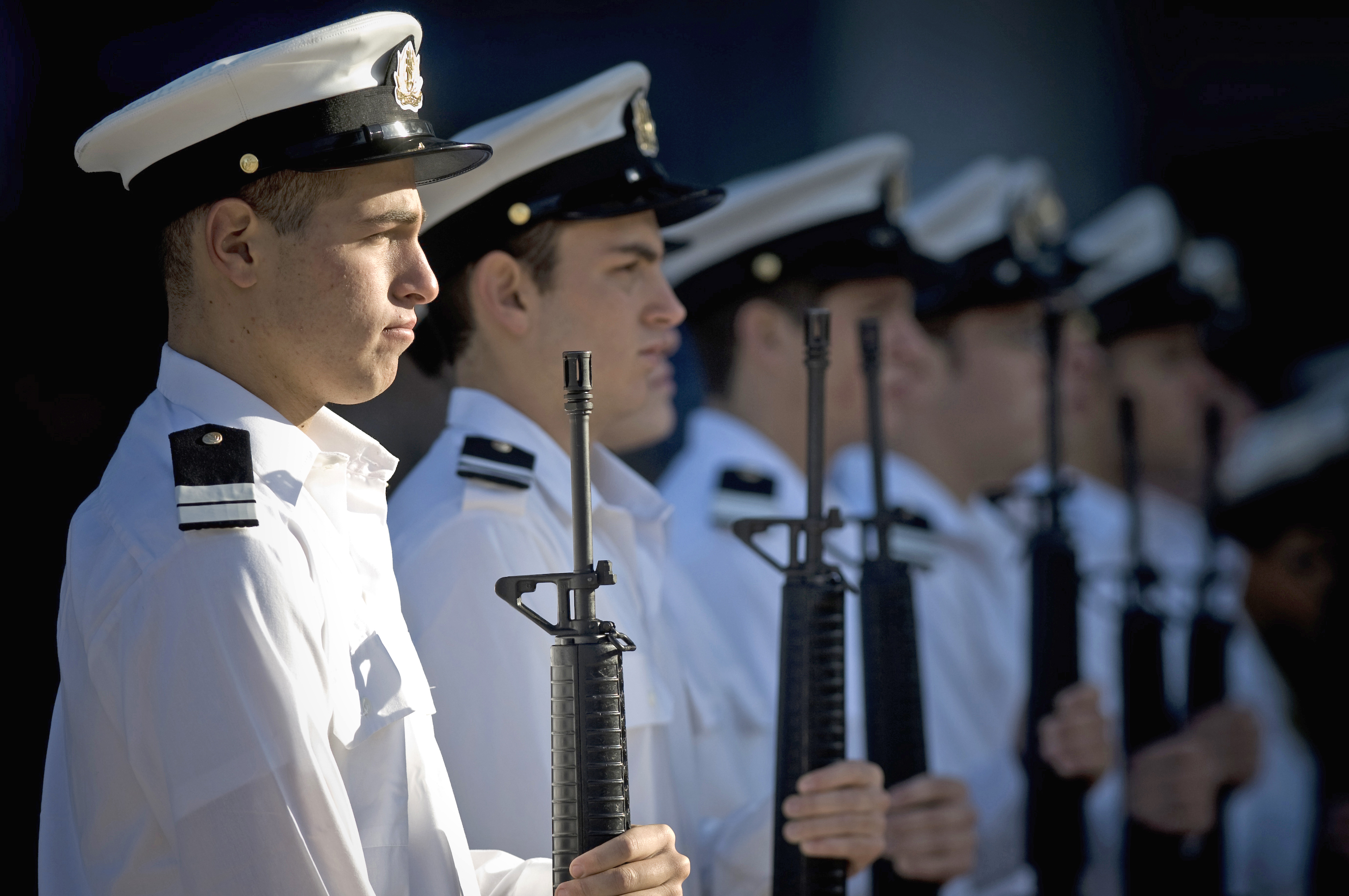
Israeli naval honor guards on Navy Day.

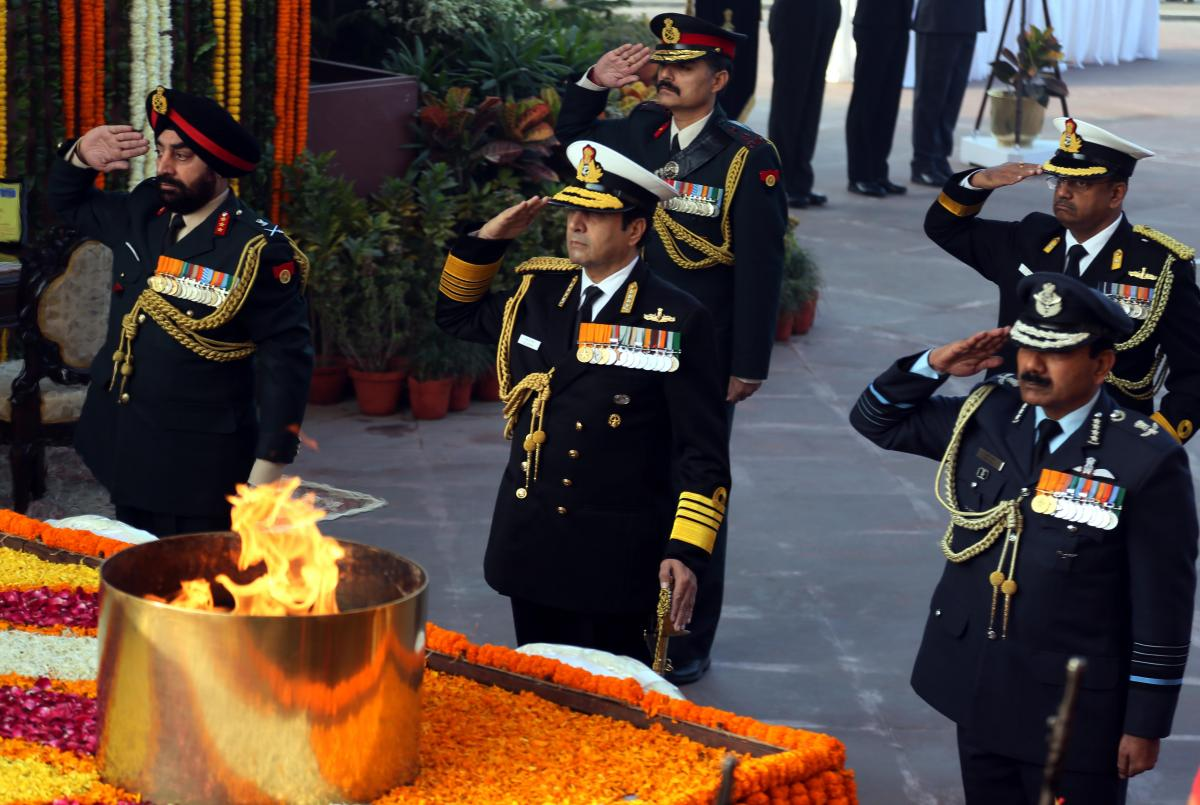
A homage ceremony at Amar Jawan Jyoti on during the Navy Day celebrations in New Delhi, 2015.

Several nations observe or have observed a Navy Day to recognize their navy.

== By country ==
=== Argentina ===
The Argentine Navy day is celebrated on May 17, anniversary of the victory achieved in 1814 against the Spanish fleet in the Battle of Montevideo.

=== Bahrain ===
The Royal Bahrain Naval Force Day is celebrated on February 18.

=== Bangladesh ===
The Bangladesh Navy Day is celebrated on March 26, in anniversary the Independence Day of Bangladesh, the day in which Bangladesh Navy first came into existence.

=== Bulgaria ===
Bulgaria's Navy Day is celebrated on the second Sunday in August.

=== Chile ===
The Día de las Glorias Navales is a public holiday in Chile on May 21. It commemorates the Battle of Iquique on May 21, 1879, in the War of the Pacific.

Until 2015 and since 2018, the day also marked the opening of the ordinary Parliamentary season (through September 18, Independence Day) and is the traditional day for the President's State of the Nation address.

Principal civic acts are performed in Santiago de Chile, Iquique and Valparaíso, where the Chilean Navy Headquarters are located, as well as in Punta Arenas, Puerto Montt, Arica and Talcahuano.

=== China ===
The People's Liberation Army of China celebrates the founding of its naval arm on "Navy Day", 23 April.

=== Croatia ===
The Day of the Croatian Navy is celebrated on September 18.

=== Ecuador ===
Navy Day (Día de la Armada Nacional) is celebrated on July 25, in commemoration of the Battle of Jambelí (July 25, 1941), part of the Ecuadorian–Peruvian War.

=== India ===
Navy day in India is celebrated on 4 December every year to celebrate the achievements and role of its naval force. It commemorates the day when Indian Naval Ships set Karachi ablaze and gave a successful completion of Operation Trident.

=== Iran ===
November 28 is a Navy Day in Iran. It commemorates Operation Morvarid of 1980, a major Iranian Navy victory during the Iran–Iraq War.

=== Israel ===
In Israel, Navy Day (יום חיל הים) is celebrated on June 30. At this time in 1948 the Port of Haifa was captured by Israel during the 1948 Arab–Israeli War. Traditionally, Navy Day is preceded by Memorial Evening.

In 1993 Admiral Ami Ayalon decided to hold the Israel Navy day in the last week of October, commemorating victories in several wars:

- The sinking of the Egyptian Navy flagship El Amir Farouq on 22 October 1948.
- Capture of the Egyptian frigate Ibrahim el Awal on 31 October 1956.
- The overwhelming successful actions of the Yom Kippur War, 6–24 October 1973.

Memorial Evening was rescheduled as well, marking the loss of destroyer INS Eilat on 21/10/1967. As of 2009 the celebrations have been elongated for a week, which for practical reasons, are held each year in August.

Another significance of June 30 Navy Day is a legacy of the Soviet Union that introduced this holiday in June 1939; the date was chosen in connection with the Battle of Gangut which took place on 27 July^{Jul.}/ 7 August 1714^{Greg.}. This date is celebrated by a number of Soviet Jews who immigrated to Israel in 1990s.

=== Italy ===
In Italy, Navy Day is June 10 and it is not a national holiday. It commemorates the sinking of the Austro-Hungarian dreadnought SMS Szent István by the Italian torpedo boat MAS-15 on June 10, 1918.

=== Japan ===
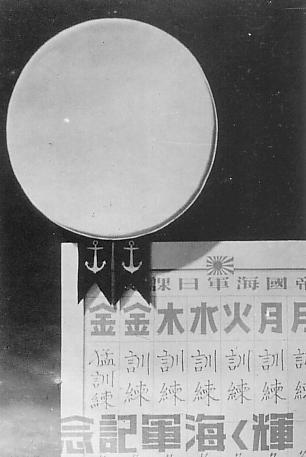
Japanese "Shining Navy Anniversary Day" official poster, 1942

In the Empire of Japan, Navy Anniversary Day (海軍記念日, Kaigun Kinen'bi) was May 27 from 1906 until 1945. It was in commemoration of the Battle of Tsushima.

=== Mexico ===
In Mexico, the Mexican Navy celebrates Navy Day on November 23, in honor of the 1825 Spanish surrender to naval ships stationed at San Juan de Ulúa. June 1 is National Maritime (Merchant Marine) Day, in honor of the Tabasco, the first ship crewed exclusively by Mexican-born sailors (1917) and the Potrero del Llano and Faja de Oro, Mexican oil tankers sunk on May 13 and 20, 1942, during World War II.

=== Netherlands ===
In The Netherlands the navy days ("vlootdagen") are held on the first weekend of July, with major events organized by the Royal Netherlands Navy.

=== Peru ===
In Peru, Navy Day is a national holiday celebrated on 8 October in commemoration of the Battle of Angamos in 1879 and the anniversary of Peruvian Navy creation in 1821.

=== Pakistan ===
In Pakistan, Navy Day (Urdu: یوم بحریہ), is celebrated on September 8 in commemoration of the Indo-Pakistan war of 1965. September 8, 1965 was the day when Pakistan Navy launched its merely successful strategic operation against India, codename Operation Dwarka, by the 25th Destroyer Squadron.

=== Portugal ===
In Portugal, since 1998, Navy Day is celebrated on May 20, in remembrance of Vasco da Gama's first arrival in India.

=== Romania ===
In Romania, Navy Day takes place on August 15, day of the Dormition of Saint Mary, the patron saint of the Romanian Navy. It was established on 15 August 1902 as a national celebration. Between 1949 and 1953, the USSR Navy Day (the last Sunday of July) was celebrated instead, and between 1954 and 1990, the event took place on the first Sunday of August. Since 1990, the Romanian Navy Day is celebrated on the original date of August 15.

=== Russia ===
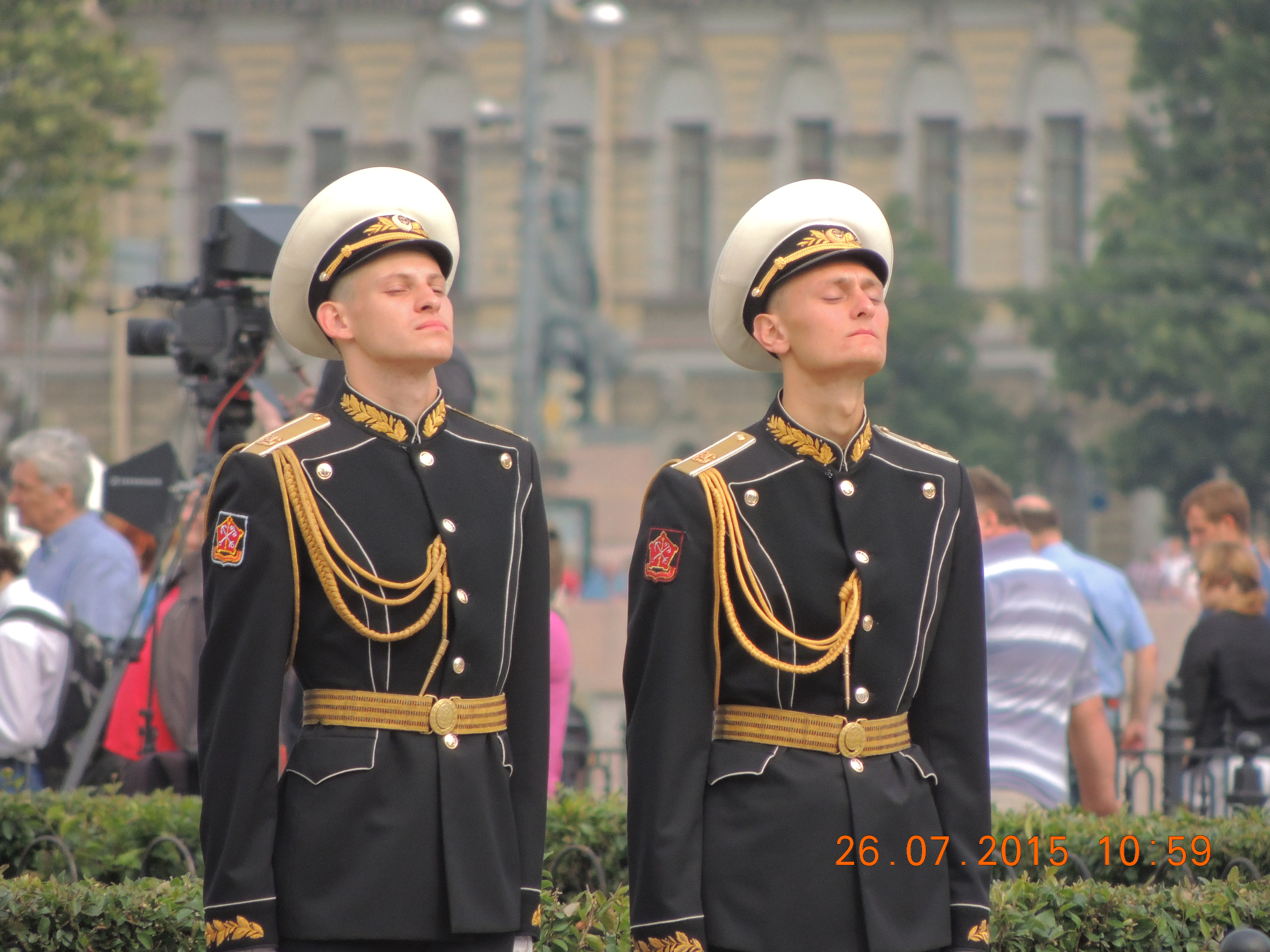
Russian honour guards during a Navy Day event.

In Russia Navy Day is a national holiday that normally takes place on the last Sunday of July. It is a legacy of the Soviet Union that introduced this holiday in June 1939; the date was chosen in connection with the Battle of Gangut.

=== Taiwan (ROC) ===
In Taiwan, Navy Day is celebrated on September 2. It commemorates the September 2 Naval Battle in 1958 during the Second Taiwan Strait Crisis.

=== Thailand ===
In Thailand, Royal Thai Navy Day is celebrated on November 20. The day commemorates the day in 1906 that King Chulalongkorn opened the Royal Thai Naval Academy.

=== Turkey ===
In Turkey, Navy Day is celebrated on September 27. It commemorates the Battle of Preveza on 27 September 1538 near Preveza in northwestern Greece between an Ottoman fleet and that of a Christian alliance assembled by Pope Paul III in which the Ottoman fleet defeated the allies. It is not a national holiday.

=== Turkmenistan ===
In Turkmenistan, Navy Day is celebrated on October 9 and celebrates the founding of the Turkmen Naval Forces in 1992.

=== Ukraine ===
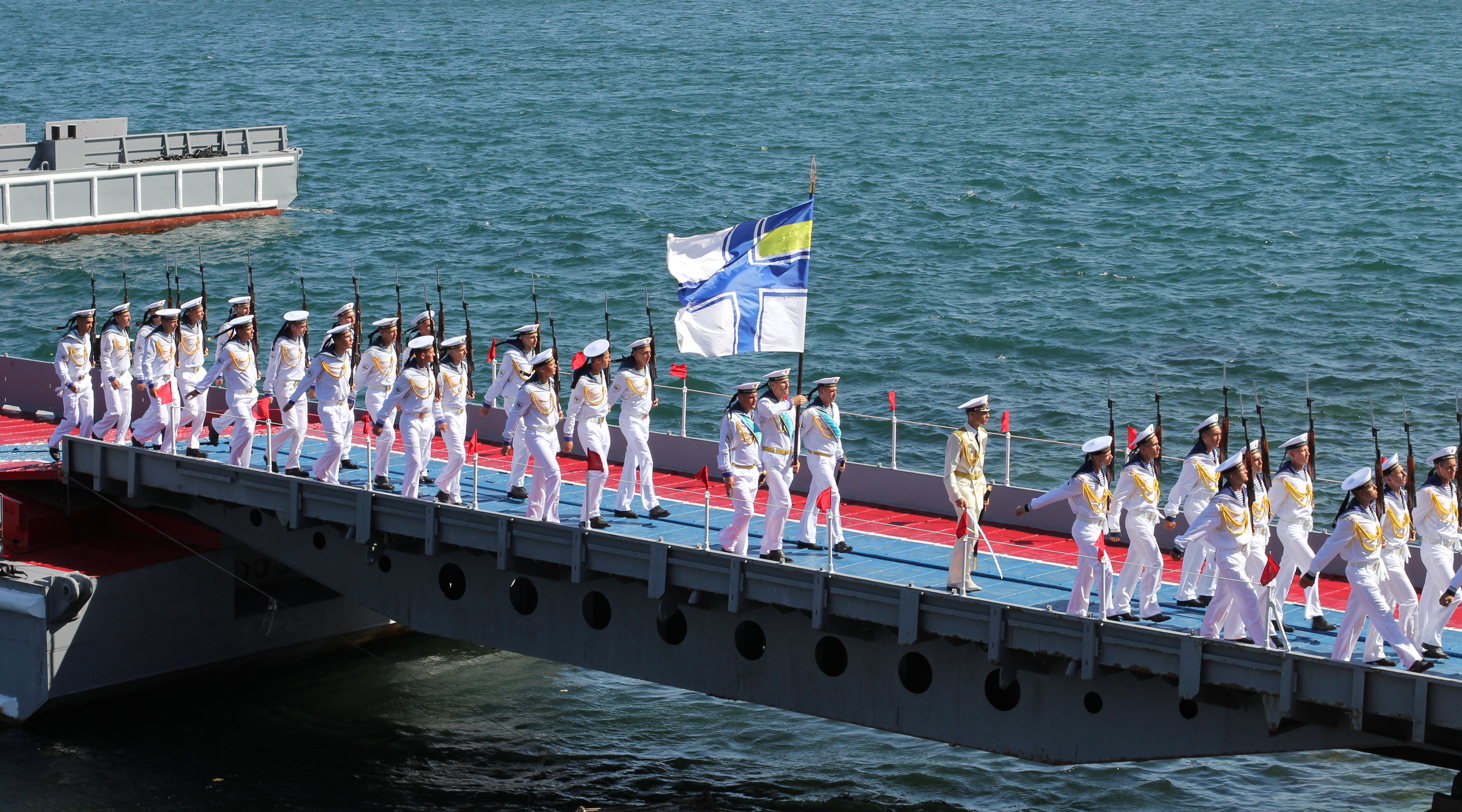
Joint celebration of The Navy Day in Russia and Ukraine. Ukrainian Naval Standard-bearers, the Bay of Sevastopol (26 July 2012)

In Ukraine, Navy Day is a professional holiday that is celebrated on the first Sunday of July. The commemoration was established in 1996 (then to be celebrated August 1). Till 2012 the day was celebrated on August 1. From 2012 till 2015 Ukraine had the same date for its Navy Day as Russia and the Soviet Union (like Russia, Ukraine is a former Soviet republic); the Soviet Union introduced its Navy Day in June 1939; the date was chosen because of a connection with the day the Battle of Gangut took place. On 24 August 2014 Ukrainian President Petro Poroshenko declared that Ukraine should not celebrate the holidays of the "military-historical calendar of Russia" but "We will honor the defenders of our homeland, not someone else's". On 12 June 2015 a Presidential decree by Poroshenko moved Ukraine's Navy Day to the first Sunday of July.

The Day of Naval Forces/Marines of Ukraine is celebrated in Ukraine on the 23rd of May annually. On 23 May 1918 Hetman of the Ukrainian State Pavlo Skoropadskyi ordered the creation of a brigade of naval infantry consisting of three regiments.

=== United Kingdom ===
The term is also used in Britain to mean an open day at a dockyard such as HMNB Portsmouth, when the public can visit military ships and see air displays, roughly along the lines of an American Fleet Week. The Royal Navy's equivalent of "Navy Day" is Trafalgar Day, which is celebrated on 21 October.

=== United States ===
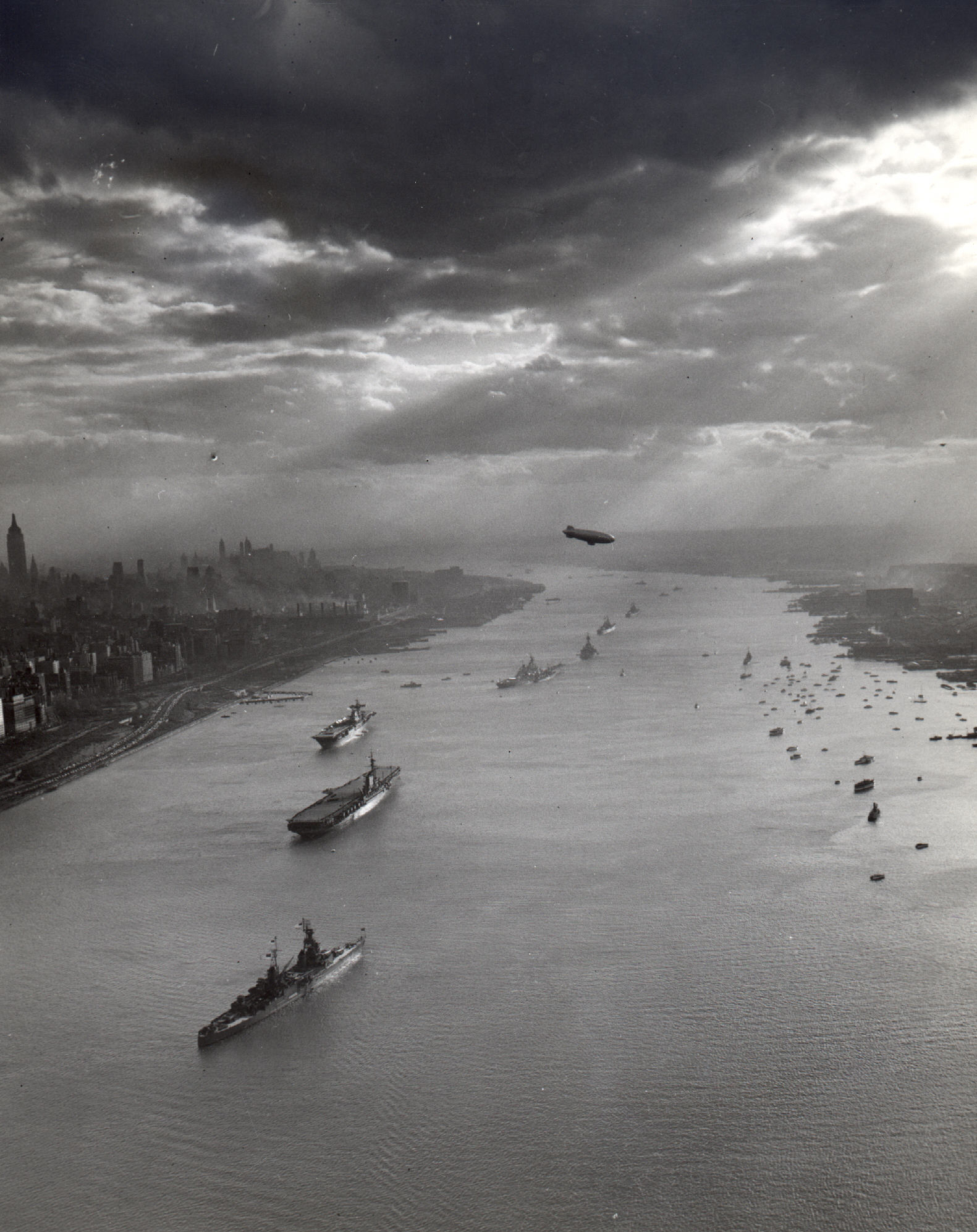
Ships anchored on the Hudson River north above New York City for the 1945 Navy Day at the victorious end of World War II.

In the United States, the Navy League of the United States organized the first Navy Day in 1922, holding it on October 27 because it was the birthday of 26th President Theodore Roosevelt (1858–1919, served 1901–1909), who was a naval enthusiast/promoter of sea power and former assistant Secretary of the Navy just before the Spanish–American War of 1898. Although meeting with mixed reviews the first year, in 1923 over 50 major cities participated, and the United States Navy sent a number of its ships to various port cities for the occasion. The 1945 Navy Day was an especially large celebration, with 33rd President Harry S. Truman (1884–1972, served 1945–1953), reviewing the returning home American fleet in New York Harbor after victory in World War II.

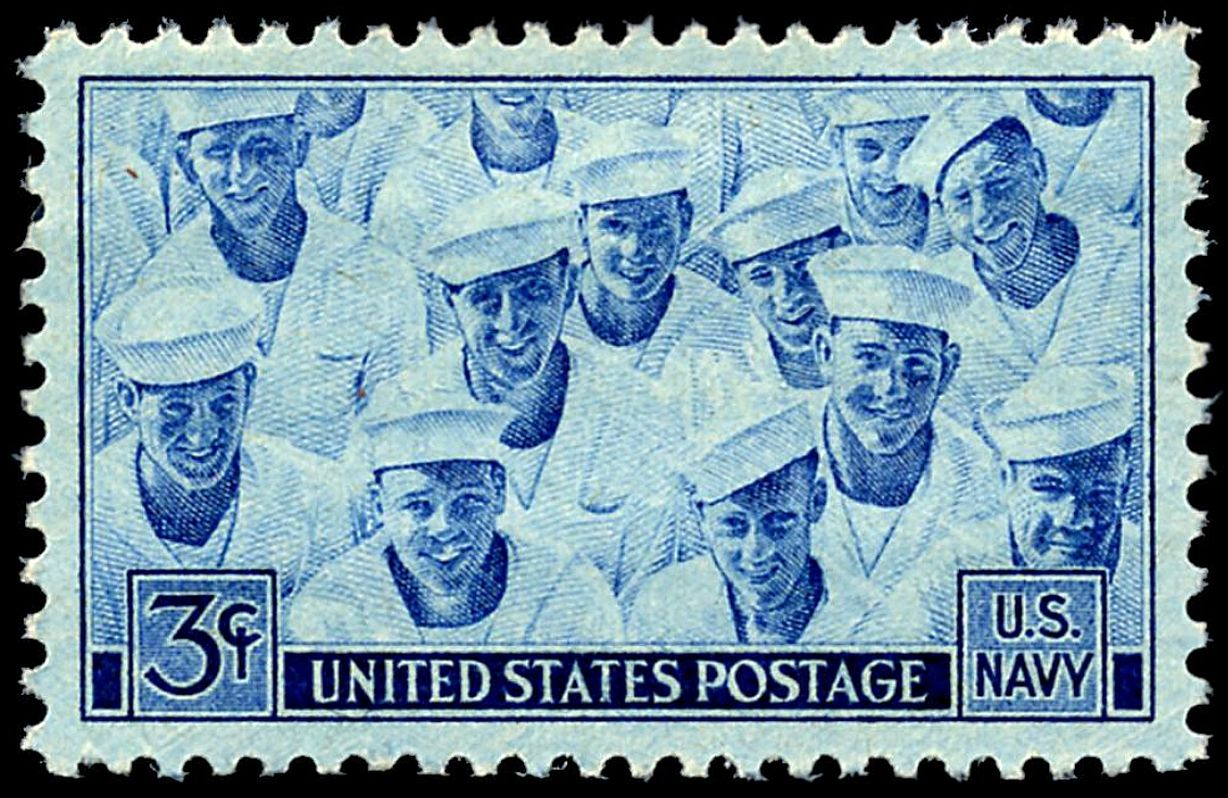
On Navy Day, October 27, 1945, the U.S. Post Office issued a commemorative stamp in honor of the Navy and the end of WW2

In 1949, Louis A. Johnson, (1891–1966, served 1949–1950), second Secretary of the newly merged and created Department of Defense, directed that the U.S. Navy's participation occur on newly established Armed Forces Day for the unified/coordinated uniformed services in May, although as a private civilian organization, the Navy League was not affected by this directive, and continued to organize separate Navy Day celebrations as before. In the 1970s, historical research found that the "birthday" of the earlier Continental Navy during the American Revolutionary War (1775–1783), was determined to be October 13, 1775, and so Chief of Naval Operations Admiral Elmo R. Zumwalt worked with the Navy League to define October 13 as the new date of Navy Day. However, Navy Day in the United States is still largely recognized as October 27, while October 13 is marked as the Navy Birthday. The period between these two dates constitute a festive period of celebrations of the birth of the Navy.

=== Venezuela and Colombia ===
July 24, the birthday of Simon Bolivar and the anniversary of the 1823 Patriot victory in the Battle of Lake Maracaibo, is marked as Navy Day in both Venezuela and Colombia. Both the Bolivarian Navy of Venezuela and the Colombian Navy hold major events to mark the holiday.

== See also ==
- Maritime Day
- Fleet Week
- Armed Forces Day
