= Unity Day (Ukraine) =

Ukrainian holiday

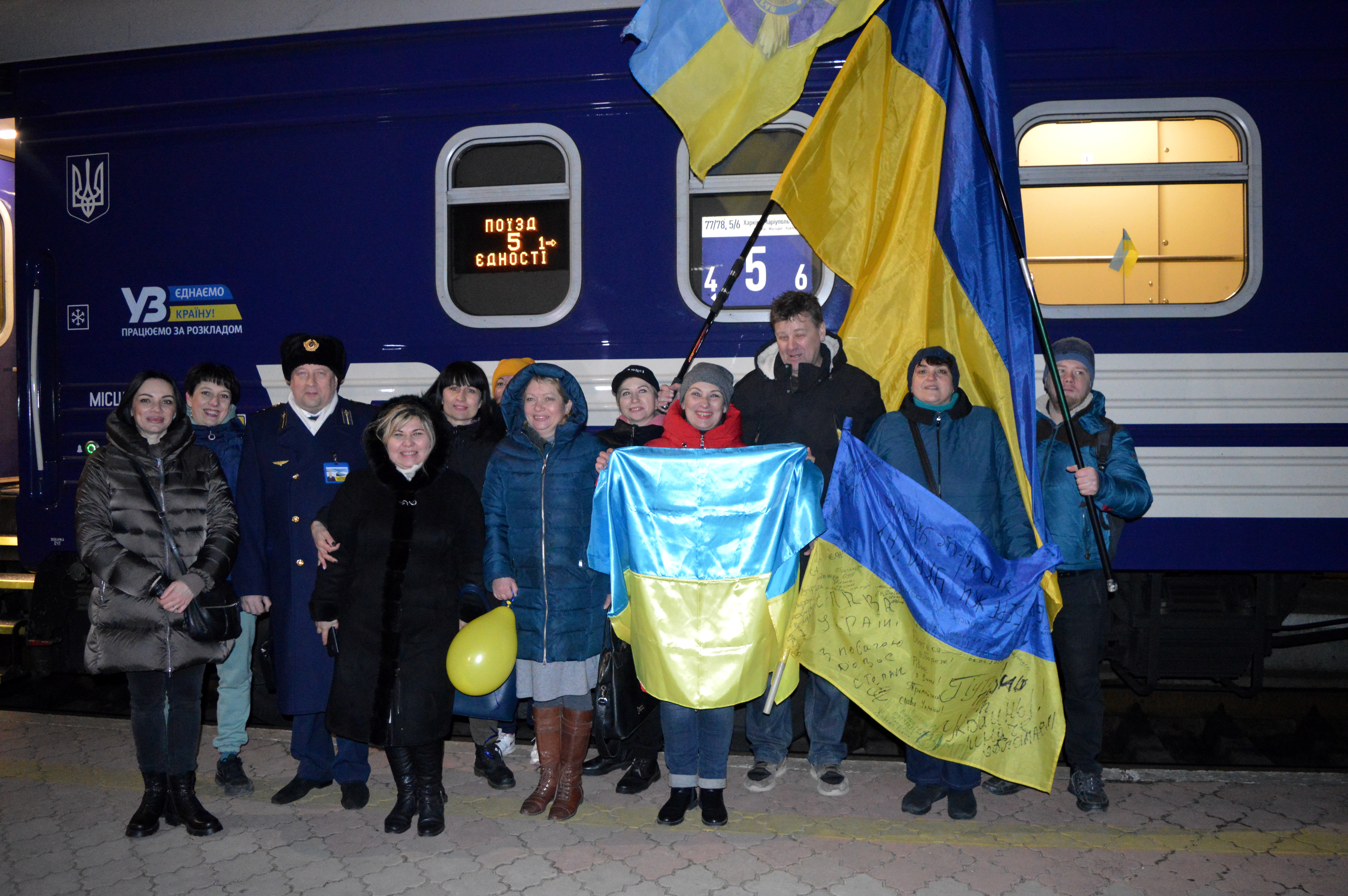
The "Unity train" running from Rakhiv to Mariupol on 17 February 2022

The Unity Day (Ukrainian: День єднання України, romanized: Den yednannia Ukrainy) is a state holiday in Ukraine held annually on 16 February 2022, per the Decree of President of Ukraine Volodymyr Zelenskyy.

== History ==
In the months prior to the 24 February 2022 Russian invasion of Ukraine 16 February 2022 was predicted in Western media as the day Russia would invade Ukraine. As a skeptically response to these foreign media reports Ukrainian president Volodymyr Zelenskyy called on people to fly flags and sing the national anthem of Ukraine on this 16 February. Zelenskyy's presidential decree that established the holiday stated that the holiday was established "To strengthen the consolidation of Ukrainian society, strengthen its stability in the conditions of the growth of hybrid threats, information, and propaganda, moral and psychological pressure on public consciousness...", (Note: Ukrainian: «З метою посилення консолідації українського суспільства, зміцнення його стійкості в умовах зростання гібридних загроз, інформаційно-пропагандистського, морально-психологічного тиску на суспільну свідомість…») according to the Decree of the President of Ukraine "On urgent measures to consolidate Ukrainian society" dated 14 February 2022 No. 53/2022. Meanwhile United States officials stated they were not predicting an assault ordered by Russian president Vladimir Putin on a specific day, but repeated warnings that this order could come at any time. According to a report by CNN on 16 February 2022 celebrations of the holiday were muted, with some events around the country only attended by a handful of people, flags large and small were flying on many street corners.

On the morning of 24 February 2022, Putin announced Russia's invasion of Ukraine (calling it a "special military operation"), Russian troops moved into Ukraine and Zelenskyy declared martial law. Russia apparently intended to rapidly seize the (capital of Ukraine) Kyiv quickly, with Spetsnaz infiltrating the city, supported by airborne operations and a rapid mechanised advance from the north. Russian Airborne Forces attempted to seize two key airfields near Kyiv, launching an airborne assault on Antonov Airport, This Russian Kyiv offensive failed and by April 2022 Kyiv Oblast was liberated from Russian troops while the war continued.

The 'Unity Day'-holiday continues to exist. Although no specific traditions were formed over the years, Ukrainian cities and towns raise the national flag and perform the national anthem.
