= Rufina Bazlova =

Belarusian artist

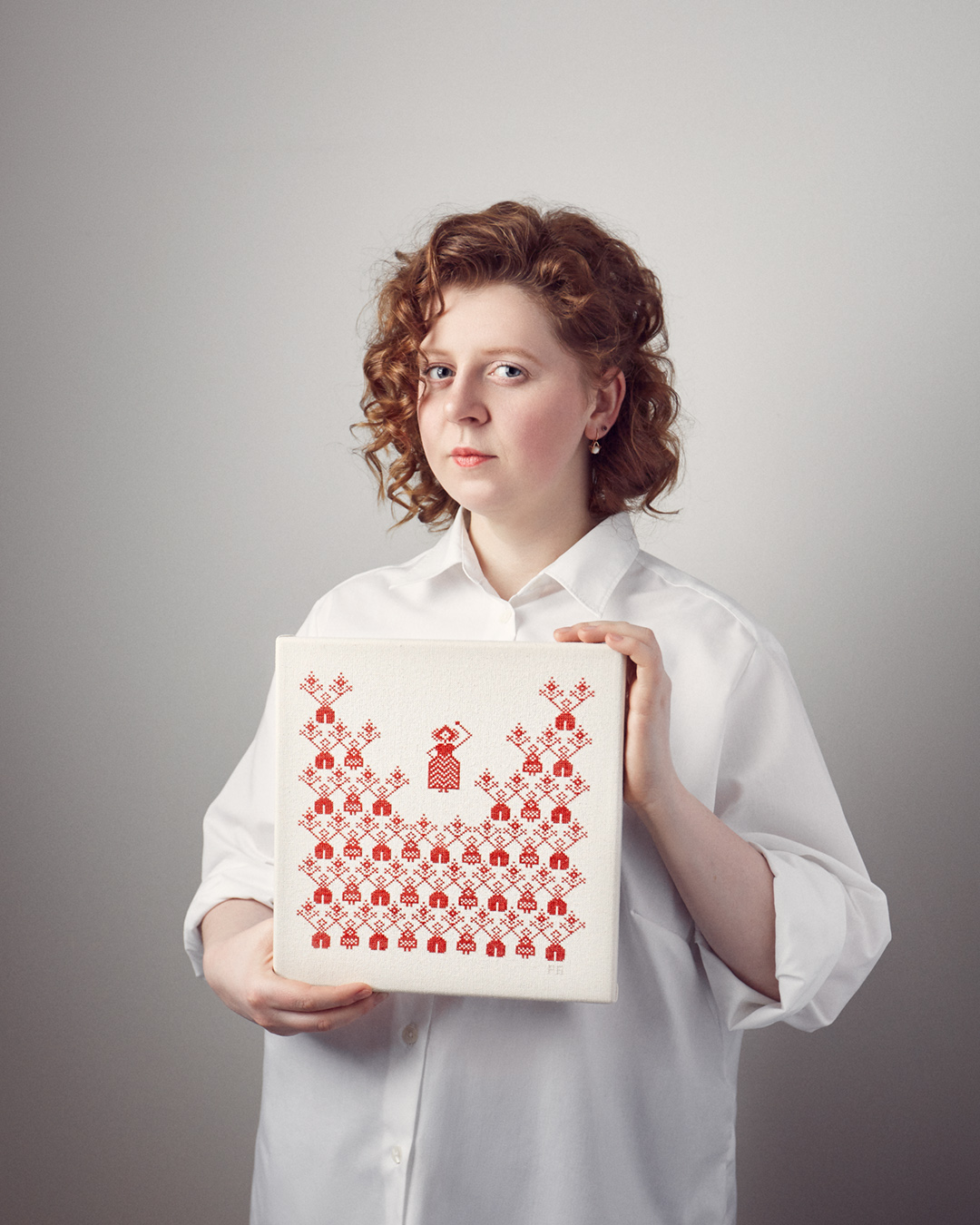
- Bazlova in 2022
- Born: 1990 (age 35–36); Grodno, Byelorussian SSR, Soviet Union
- Known for: Illustration
- Notable work: The History of Belarusian Vyzhyvanka, Framed in Belarus
- Awards: Young Package Award
- Website: vyzyvanka.com

Rufina Bazlova (Belarusian: Руфіна Базлова; born 1990) is a Belarusian artist based in Prague. She gained international renown for her 2020 series The History of Belarusian Vyzhyvanka, which uses the traditional embroidery craft of vyshyvanka to depict the protests in Belarus.

== Biography ==
Bazlova comes from the large city of Grodno in western Belarus. She studied in Plzeň and later worked in Prague as a set designer and performance artist. She received her master's diploma in illustration and graphic design from the University of West Bohemia in Plzeň in 2015. Bazlova moved to Prague and completed a bachelor's degree in scenography at the Academy of Performing Arts in 2020.

== Work ==
In August 2020, thousands of people joined the protests against Alexander Lukashenko's disputed re-election, including many artists. In response to the disputed results of the Belarusian presidential election, Bazlova designed her first protest embroideries and posted them on Instagram. Bazlova uses traditional Belarusian embroidery to create critical art. The figures, which look like pictograms, are in the national colors of white and red of the Belarusian opposition. The technique of applying red thread to white fabric with cross stitching evokes the vyshyvanka technique, a local folk tradition. The embroideries, which at first seem harmless, become digital narratives and thus a testament to the Belarusian mass protests.

Since the early Middle Ages, vyshyvanka, the East Slavic patterns in Russia, Ukraine and Belarus, have been embroidered on clothing. Motifs of that time were about love, the sun, or protection against evil spirits. Bazlova's depictions include tanks, helicopters, fleeing people, swastikas, cockroaches, and dump trucks. Among protesters in Belarus, the cockroach symbol is code for President Alexander Lukashenko, who has brutally quelled mass protests since the allegedly rigged presidential election in August 2020. Bazlova's art provides insight into the female-driven democratic resistance in Belarus.

Bazlova creates her designs digitally; very few motifs are actually produced, as production would be too time-consuming. The digitally processed vyshyvanka designs documented the history of the Belarusian uprising. According to Bazlova, each tableau is associated with an actual event from 2020. Her series ''The History of Belarusian Vyzhyvanka'' has become internationally known; Vyzhyvanka is a play on words from the Belarusian words "embroidery" and "survival." Vyshyvanka means "embroidered shirt." Vyzhyvats means "to survive". In the embroidered comic Zhenokol (Feminnature) Rufina Bazlova presented themes on feminism in the folk tradition.

The original background was that women who made traditional Belarusian ornaments could neither read nor write. Embroidery was the only way to represent their life, their surroundings. They created special geometric signs and used mainly red color as a symbol of blood and life on the pure linen background, which symbolized freedom and purity. Belarusian ornaments are in a way a code for our national history, which could be read as a text.

— Rufina Bazlova

Together with Sofia Tokar, Bazlova founded Framed in Belarus, a social art project that addresses the situation of political prisoners. On the occasion of the Charlemagne Prize award in 2022, Rufina Bazlova exhibited current works in Aachen.

In August 2022, Ukrainian President Volodymyr Zelenskyy wore a shirt designed by Bazlova at the opening of Independence Week. Bazlova also designed the New Year's card for the German Federal Foreign Office in 2022.

== Awards ==
- 2021: The second prize on III Biennale of Artistic Textiles in Poznan

== Exhibitions (selection) ==
Solo exhibitions

- 2023: Such a Minsk flag installation Das Minsk Potsdam
- 2022: Outpost Kunstverein Dresden
- 2022: Vyžyvanka pro.story Zlín
- 2022: Ein Roter Faden Suermondt-Ludwig Museum Aachen
- 2021: Nici z demokracji Galeria Browarna Łowicz
- 2021: The History of Belarusian Vyzhyvanka UCLA Library, Los Angeles

Group exhibitions

- 2023: Appunti su Questo Tempo CasermArcheologica, Sansepolcro
- 2022/23: Politics Museum of Contemporary Art in Kraków, Kraków
- 2022/23: What is the Proper Way to Display a Flag? Weserburg Museum für Moderne Kunst (Modern art museum) Bremen
- 2022/23: Manifest yourself Künstlerhaus Bethanien, Berlin
- 2022: The Medium is the Message: Flags and Banners The Wende Museum at The Armory, Culver City, USA
- 2021: Demo Mode Society Galerie ASPN in Leipzig
- 2021: Patchwork Le Radar, Bayeux
