= Public holidays in Ukraine =

The following are the eleven public holidays in Ukraine.

== Holidays established by law ==
Date	English name	Ukrainian name	Remarks
1 January	New Year's Day	Новий рік (Novyi Rik)	
8 March	International Women's Day	Міжнародний жіночий день (Mizhnarodnyi zhinochyi den)	
moveable	(Revised Julian) Easter	Великдень (Velykden)	Christian holiday
moveable	(Revised Julian) Pentecost	Трійця (Triitsia)	Christian holiday
1 May	International Workers' Day	День праці (Den pratsi)	Until 2018, 2 May was also a public holiday
8 May	Day of Remembrance and Victory over Nazism in World War II, 1939–1945	День пам'яті та перемоги над нацизмом у Другій світовій війні 1939–1945 років (Den pamiati ta peremohy nad natsyzmom u Druhii svitovii viini 1939–1945 rokiv)	To commemorate the end of World War II and the Allied victory over Nazi Germany
28 June	Constitution Day	День Конституції України (Den Konstytutsii Ukrainy)	To commemorate Ukraine's Constitution of 1996
15 July	Statehood Day	День Української Державності (Den Ukrainskoi Derzhavnosti)	To commemorate the Christianization of Kievan Rus' (28 July until 2023)
24 August	Independence Day	День Незалежності України (Den Nezalezhnosti Ukrainy)	From the USSR in 1991
1 October	Defenders of Ukraine Day	День захисників і захисниць України (Den zakhysnykiv i zakhysnyts Ukrainy)	Public holiday since 2015 (14 October until 2022)
25 December	Christmas	Різдво Христове (Rizdvo Khrystove)	Christian holiday since 2017, previously celebrated on 7 January (from 2017 to 2022 celebrated on 7 January and 25 December)

During martial law a public holiday is not a non-working day.

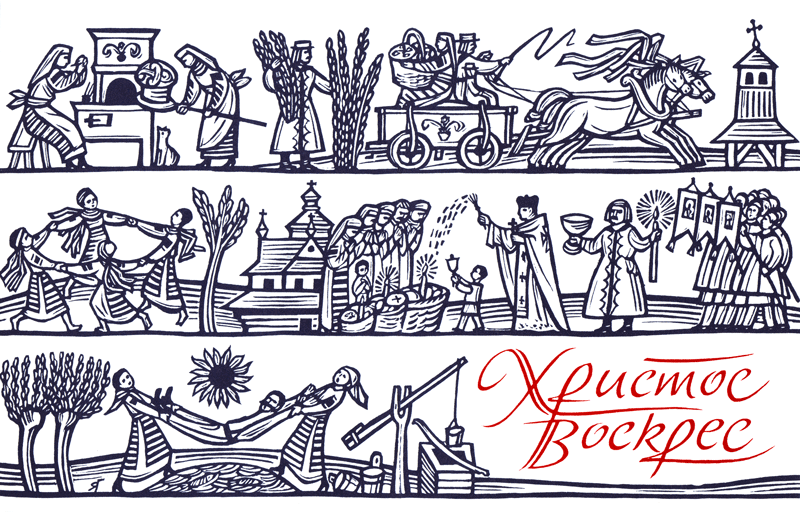
Easter postcard (by Jacques Hnizdovsky)

Before the Orthodox Church of Ukraine and the Ukrainian Greek Catholic Church switched to the Revised Julian calendar in September 2023 all Christian holidays were observed according to the Julian calendar, since then Christmas is officially celebrated on 25 December. From 2017 to 2022 Christmas was celebrated in Ukraine on 2 different days, 7 January (the date of the holiday according to the Julian calendar) and 25 December (the date of the holiday according to the Gregorian and Revised Julian calendars). From 2023 Christmas is only officially celebrated in Ukraine on 25 December.

When a public holiday falls on a weekend (e.g. Saturday or Sunday), the following working day (e.g. Monday) turns into an official day off too.

If only one or only two working days are between a public holiday and another day off then the Cabinet of Ministers of Ukraine usually releases a recommendation to avoid this gap by moving these working days onto a certain Saturday (that is to have uninterrupted vacations, but to compensate this by work on another day which would be a day off). Usually such recommendations only concern those employees whose weekly days off are Saturday and Sunday.

The Russian invasion of Ukraine that started on 24 February 2022 led to a reappraisal of the popularity of the public holidays in Ukraine. A March 2024 study by the Kyiv International Institute of Sociology found that the popularity of Independence Day of Ukraine and Defenders Day had both almost more than doubled (from 37% to 64% and from 29% to 58%) while the popularity of International Women's Day had fallen from being labelled "most beloved" by 49% of respondents in 2017 to 21% in March 2024.

== Holidays celebrated by the uniformed organizations ==
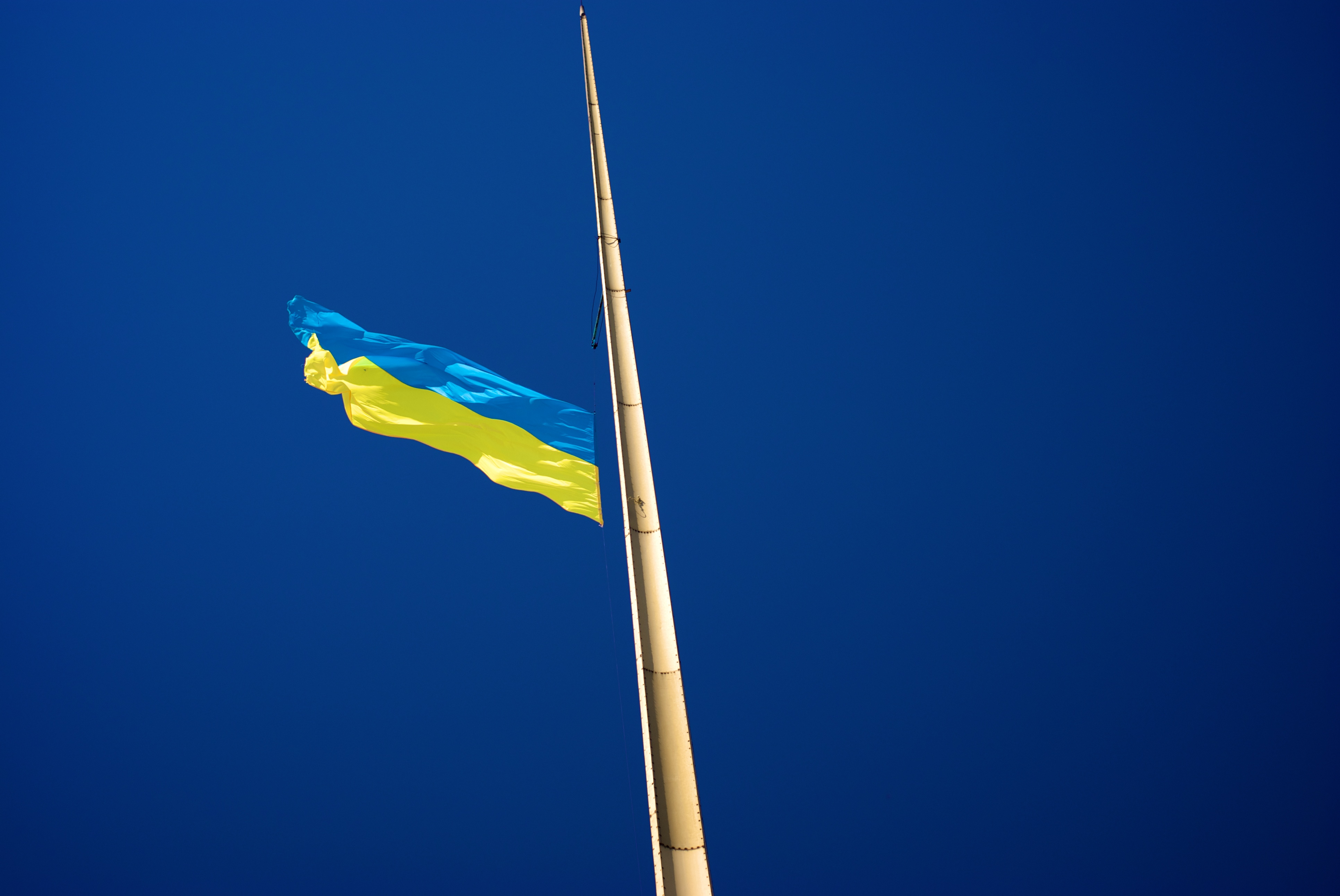
Flag of Ukraine

- 26 March – National Guard Day
- 30 April – Border Guards Day
- 6 May – Day of the Mechanized Infantry
- 18 May – Reservists' Day
- 23 May – Marine Corps Birthday, Heroes of Ukraine Day
- 27 May – Special Operations Forces Day
- 4 July – Police Day
- First Sunday in July – Navy Day; From 1997 till 2011 this day was celebrated on 1 August
- First Sunday in August – Air Defence Forces Day
- 8 August – Signal Corps Day
- 7 September – Military Intelligence Forces Day
- 9 September – Armoured Forces Day
- 12 September - Electronic Warfare Troops Day
- 14 September – Mobilized Servicemen Day
- First Sunday in October – Territorial Defence Forces Day
- 29 October – Finance Officers Day
- 3 November – Corps of Engineers Day
- 8 November – Air Assault Forces Day
- 4 December – Rocket Forces and Artillery Day
- 6 December – Armed Forces Day; festive fireworks and salutes take place in various cities in Ukraine; The holiday was established in 1993 by the Verkhovna Rada (Ukraine's national parliament).
- 12 December – Ground Forces Day
- 18 December - Military Counterintelligence Day
- 23 December – Operational Servicemen Day

== Other national holidays ==
=== Fixed date ===
- 5 January – Anniversary of the Autocephaly of the Orthodox Church of Ukraine
- 5 January – Epiphany Eve (Second Holy Evening)
- 6 January – Epiphany
- 7 January – Synaxis of the Holy Prophet and Forerunner of Christ, Saint John the Baptist
- 20 January – Day of Remembrance of the Ukrainian Defenders of the Second Battle of Donetsk Airport (2014–2015)
- 22 January – Ukrainian Unity Day, marking both the 1918 Fourth Universal of the Ukrainian Central Council and the 1919 Unification Act
- 24 January - International Day of Education
- 29 January - Battle of Kruty Memorial Day
- 2 February – Candlemas
- 14 February - Valentine's Day
- 16 February – Unity Day
- 20 February – World Day of Social Justice and Day of Remembrance of the Fallen Martyrs of Euromaidan, the Heavenly Hundred Heroes
- 21 February – Day of Dignity and Freedom, anniversary of the 2014 victory of the Revolution of Dignity
- 24 February – Mourning Day of the Beginning of the Russian invasion of Ukraine (beginning 2022)
- 26 February – Day of Resistance to Occupation of Crimea and Sevastopol
- 9-10 March – Shevchenko Days
- 19 March – Saint Joseph's Day
- 25 March – Feast of the Annunciation and the Day of the Security Service of Ukraine
- 26 March - Synaxis of the Archangel Saint Gabriel
- 6 April - International Day of Sport for Development and Peace
- 20 April – Earth Day
- 26 April - Memorial Day of the 1986 Chernobyl nuclear disaster
- 7 May – Beginning of the Time of Remembrance and Reconciliation for Those Who Lost Their Lives during the Second World War and Second World War Remembrance Day (Observance) (beginning 2023–24)
- 9 May – Europe Day and Anniversary of the 1920 Kyiv Polish-Ukrainian Victory Parade
- 14 May – Memorial Day of the Ukrainian Fallen of the Second World War
- 15 May – International Family Day
- 24 May – Saints Cyril and Methodius' Day (also Slavonic Literature and Culture Day)
- 28 May - All-Ukrainian Local History Day
- 29 May – International Day of United Nations Peacekeepers
- 4 June - International Day of Innocent Children Victims of Aggression
- 5 June - World Environment Day
- 19 June - Ukrainian Farmers' Day
- 22 June – Day of Remembrance and Sorrow (Anniversary of the Beginning of the Second World War in Ukraine and territories of the former Soviet Union)
- 23 June – Olympic Day and Day of the Ukrainian Civil Service
- 24 June – Kupala Night and the Nativity of John the Baptist
- 29 June – Feast of Saints Peter and Paul
- 1 July - Ukrainian Architects' Day
- 15 July – Day of Christianization of Kievan Rus'–Ukraine
- 16 July – Anniversary of the Declaration of State Sovereignty of Ukraine and Ukrainian Bank Employees and Auditors Day
- 1 August – Honey Feast of the Saviour
- 6 August – Feast of the Transfiguration / Apple Feast of the Saviour
- 12 August – International Youth Day and International Day For Monuments and Sites
- 15 August – Feast of the Assumption and Dormition of the Mother of God
- 16 August – Nut Feast of the Saviour
- 23 August – Black Ribbon Day and National Flag Day
- 28 August - Synaxis of the Venerable Fathers of the Kyiv Pechersk Lavra Far Caves
- 29 August – Day of Remembrance of the Defenders of Ukraine (remembrance day of the great Ukrainian casualties during the Battle of Ilovaisk on 29 August 2014) and Beheading of John the Baptist
- 31 August – Feast of the Cincture and Holy Belt of the Mother of God, Romanian Language Day
- 1 September – Knowledge Day and Eastern Rite Ecclesiastical New Year
- 8 September – Feast of the Nativity of Mary
- 12 September - Feast of the Most Holy Name of the Blessed Virgin Mary (Catholic Feast)
- 14 September – Feast of the Cross
- 15 September - International Day of Democracy
- 17 September – Adoption Day
- 28 September Synaxis of the Venerable Fathers of the Kyiv Pechersk Lavra Near Caves
- 30 September – All-Ukrainian Day of Libraries
- 1 October – Intercession of Mary Most Holy the Mother of God, Day of Ukrainian Cossacks, Ukrainian Veterans' Day
- 2 October - Synaxis and Feast of St. Andrew of Constantinople/Istanbul, Fool-for-Christ
- 14 October – Anniversary of the Formation of the Ukrainian Insurgent Army
- 24 October - United Nations Day
- 27 October – Day of Ukrainian Literature and Language
- 28 October – Liberation from Fascism Day
- 31 October – Reformation Day (most Protestant Christian denominations in Ukraine)
- 2 November - All Souls' Day (Latin Rite Catholics)
- 5 November - International Day for Preventing the Exploitation of the Environment in War and Armed Conflict
- 9 November – Day of Ukrainian cultural workers and masters of folk and traditional arts
- 13 November – Reformation Day (Ukrainian Lutheran Church, Julian calendar observance)
- 20 November – Proclamation Day of the Ukrainian People's Republic and World Children's Day (since 2025) (Note: till 2025 observance only, most celebrations were held on 1 June as International Children's Day)
- 21 November – Feast of the Presentation of the Most Holy Mother of God into the Temple and Dignity and Freedom Day (the anniversaries of both the first Euromaidan protest day in 2013 and the victory of the 2004 Orange Revolution)
- 6 December – Saint Nicholas Day
- 8 December – Feast of the Immaculate Conception
- 9 December – Feast of the Conception of the Virgin Mary
- 24 December – Christmas Eve (First Holy Evening), also marked as Day of the State Emergency Service of Ukraine
- 26 December – Boxing Day (Synaxis of Mary the Mother of God and Feast of Saint Stephen)
- 31 December – New Year's Eve and Malanka (Bounteous Evening)

=== Movable ===
- Synaxis of the Venerable Fathers of the Kyiv Pechersk Lavra Caves – second Sunday of Orthodox Great Lent
- Earth Hour – last Saturday of March (observance)
- Maundy Thursday – marked three days before Western Christian and Orthodox Easter
- Good Friday – marked two days before Western Christian and Orthodox Easter
- Holy Saturday – marked on the Saturday before Western Christian and Orthodox Easter
- Bright Monday – Monday after Orthodox Easter Sunday
- Feast of the Ascension – Thursday ten days before Pentecost
- Pentecost Sunday in the Gregorian Calendar – 7th Sunday after Easter/Pascha as marked by Catholics and most Protestants
- Whit Monday – Monday after Pentecost
- Trinity Sunday – first Sunday after Pentecost
- Feast of Corpus Christi (Catholic Feast) – Thursday after Trinity Sunday
- Vyshyvanka Day – third Thursday of May
- Solemnity of the Sacred Heart of Jesus (Catholic Feast) - Friday after Corpus Christi
- Memorial of the Immaculate Heart of the Mother of God (Catholic Feast) - Saturday after Corpus Christi
- Day of the Ukrainian Cinema - 2nd Saturday of September
- Teachers' Day - First Sunday of October nearest 5 October, World Teachers' Day, or 5 October if falling on Sunday
- Day of the State Health Services - Second Sunday of October
- Christ the King Sunday (Catholic Feast) - Sunday before the 1st Sunday of Advent
- Holodomor Memorial Day – fourth Saturday of November

== See also ==
- Christmas in Ukraine
