= Statehood Day (Ukraine) =

National holiday

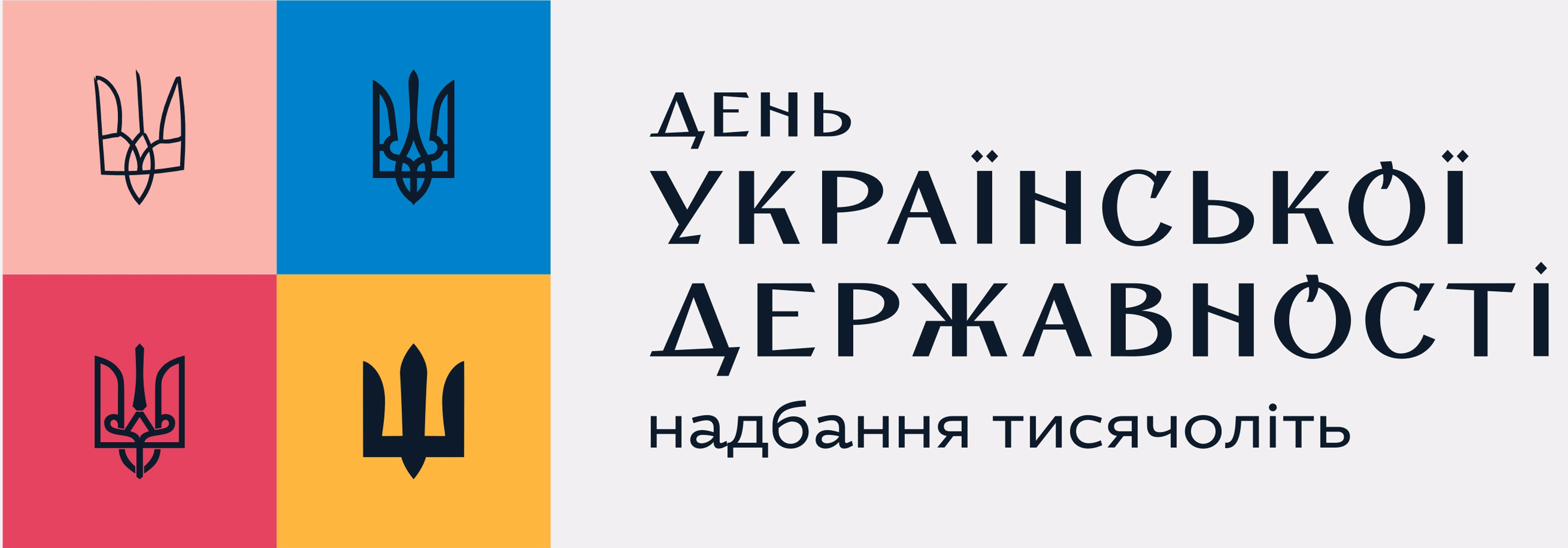
- "Day of Ukrainian Statehood: A Millennia of Heritage" (2022)
- Official name: День Української Державності
- Date: 15 July
- Next time: 15 July 2027
- Frequency: Annual
- First time: 2022

Statehood Day or the Day of Ukrainian Statehood (Ukrainian: День Української Державності, romanized: Denʹ Ukrayinsʹkoyi Derzhavnosti) is a national holiday in Ukraine, celebrated annually on 15 July, in commemoration of the Christianization of Kievan Rus'. It was previously celebrated on 28 July in 2022 and 2023.

== History ==
On 16 February 2018 three former Presidents of Ukraine, Leonid Kravchuk, Leonid Kuchma, and Viktor Yushchenko, in an address to the Verkhovna Rada (Ukraine's parliament) pleaded for the implementation of a Day of Ukrainian Statehood.

The Day of Ukrainian Statehood (Ukrainian: День Української Державності, romanized: Den Ukrainskoi Derzhavnosti) was established by decree of President Volodymyr Zelenskyy in 2021 during the celebration of the 30th anniversary of Ukrainian independence and was adopted by the Verkhovna Rada on 31 May 2022. It was celebrated for the first time on 28 July 2022. It was selected on the day commemorating the Christianization of Kievan Rus', which occurred under the rule of Prince Vladimir (Volodymyr) in 988, which is viewed in Ukraine as the continuation of the more than thousand-year history of Ukraine.

Ukrainian expectation of the law is that it will help assert the continuity of Ukrainian statehood, protect Ukraine's national interests, preserve historical justice and eliminate fake narratives by Russia regarding the historical aspects of the formation of the Ukrainian state.

After the Bishops' Council was held on 24 May 2023, it became known that the Orthodox Church of Ukraine (OCU) would ask the authorities to postpone Statehood Day, as well as Defenders Day, due to a the adoption of the Revised Julian Calendar by the church (the dates are similar to that of the more recognised Gregorian calendar), because the holiday of Vladimir the Great in the OCU and Ukrainian Greek Catholic Church (UGCC) would be celebrated on 15 July from 2024. On 28 June, President Zelenskyy submitted to the Verkhovna Rada a draft law that moves Statehood Day from 28 to 15 July. The parliament approved this law on 14 July, with 241 deputies supporting the law. The adoption of the law came too late to be signed into law by President Zelenskyy before 15 July, so 2023 became the last year in which the holiday was celebrated on 28 July.

The event is symbolized by the Ukrainian trident, that is stated to represent struggle, independence, history and identity.
