= Navy Day (Ukraine) =

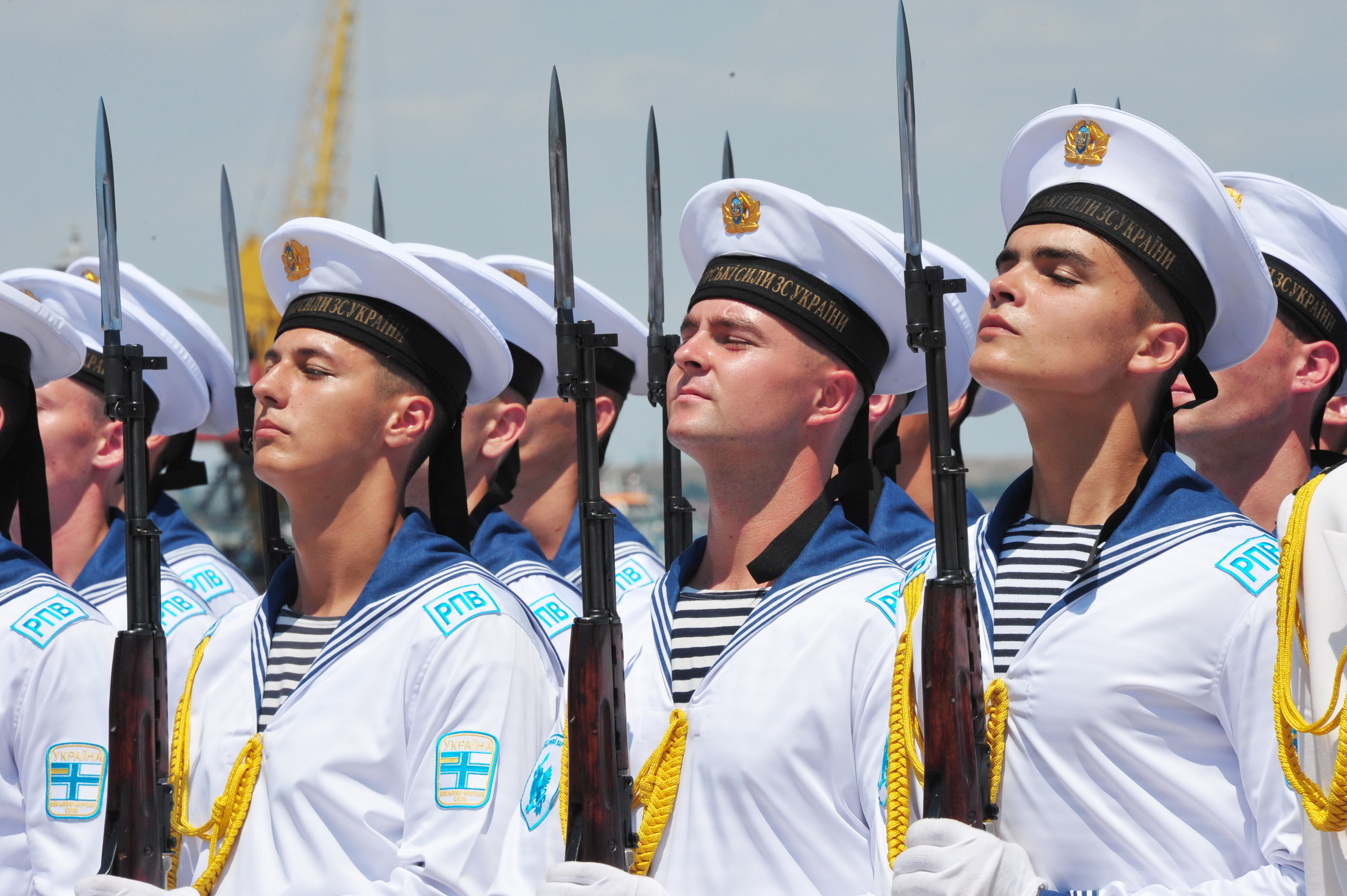
- Navy Day 2016 in Odesa.
- Official name: День працівників морського та річкового флоту України
- Observed by: Ukraine
- Type: National
- Celebrations: Ceremonies at naval bases around Ukraine.
- Date: First Sunday of July
- 2024 date: July 7
- 2025 date: July 6
- 2026 date: July 5
- 2027 date: July 4
- Frequency: annual

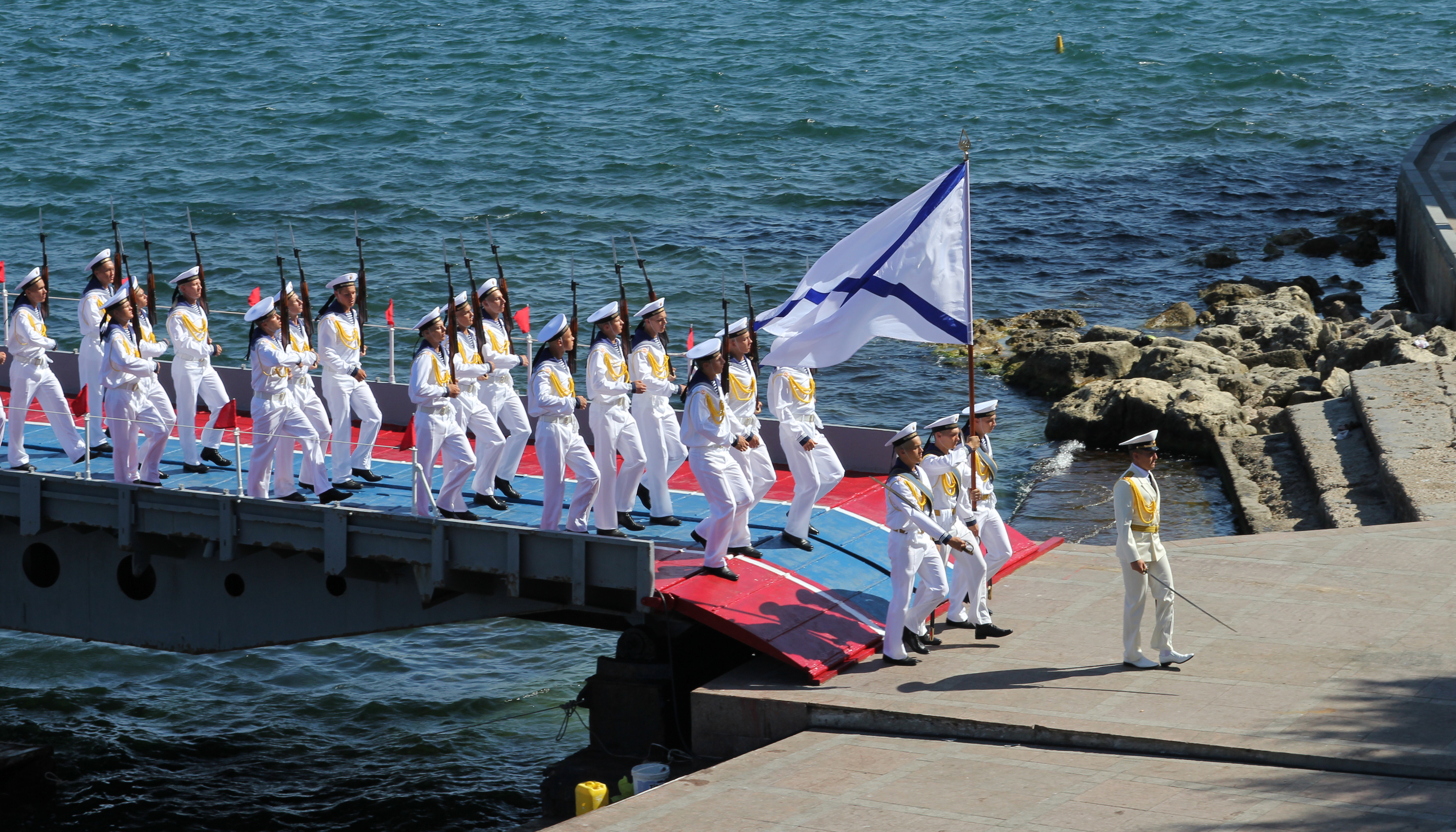
Navy Day in Sevastopol in 2012. Due to the annexation of Crimea by the Russian Federation (Note: Since the annexation of Crimea by the Russian Federation, the status of the Crimea and of the city of Sevastopol is under dispute between Russia and Ukraine; Ukraine and the majority of the international community considers the Crimea and Sevastopol an integral part of Ukraine, while Russia, on the other hand, considers the Crimea and Sevastopol an integral part of Russia, with Sevastopol functioning as a federal city (Russian authorities are in control of both).) the Ukrainian Navy no longer has any presence in Sevastopol.

The Day of the Workers of the Ukrainian Navy (Ukrainian: День працівників морського та річкового флоту України, romanized: Den pratsivnykiv morskoho ta richkovoho flotu Ukrainy), also known as Navy Day, is a holiday in Ukraine. The holiday celebrates the founding of the Ukrainian Navy. Navy Day is a professional holiday that is celebrated on every first Sunday of July.

== History ==
The commemoration was established in 1996 (then to be celebrated August 1). Till 2012 the day was celebrated on August 1. From 2012 till 2015 Ukraine had the same date for its Navy Day as Russia (the last Sunday of July) and the Soviet Union (like Russia, Ukraine is a former Soviet republic); the Soviet Union introduced its Navy Day in June 1939; the date was chosen because of a connection with the day the Battle of Gangut took place. On 24 August 2014 Ukrainian President Petro Poroshenko declared that Ukraine should not celebrate the holidays of the "military-historical calendar of Russia" but "We will honor the defenders of our homeland, not someone else's". On 12 June 2015 a Presidential decree by Poroshenko moved Ukraine's Navy Day to every first Sunday of July.

== Commemorations ==
The national leadership and the ranks of the Ukrainian Navy usually congratulate sailors on this professional holiday. Many distinguished employees are awarded with state awards, military ranks, commemorative gifts, government diplomas and official words of gratitude from their command. A naval parade is usually held at the port of Odesa. The parade inspection is done from the Ukrainian frigate Hetman Sahaydachniy.

== See also ==
- Public holidays in Ukraine
- Navy Day
