= Vyshyvanka =

Ukrainian and Belarusian folk costume

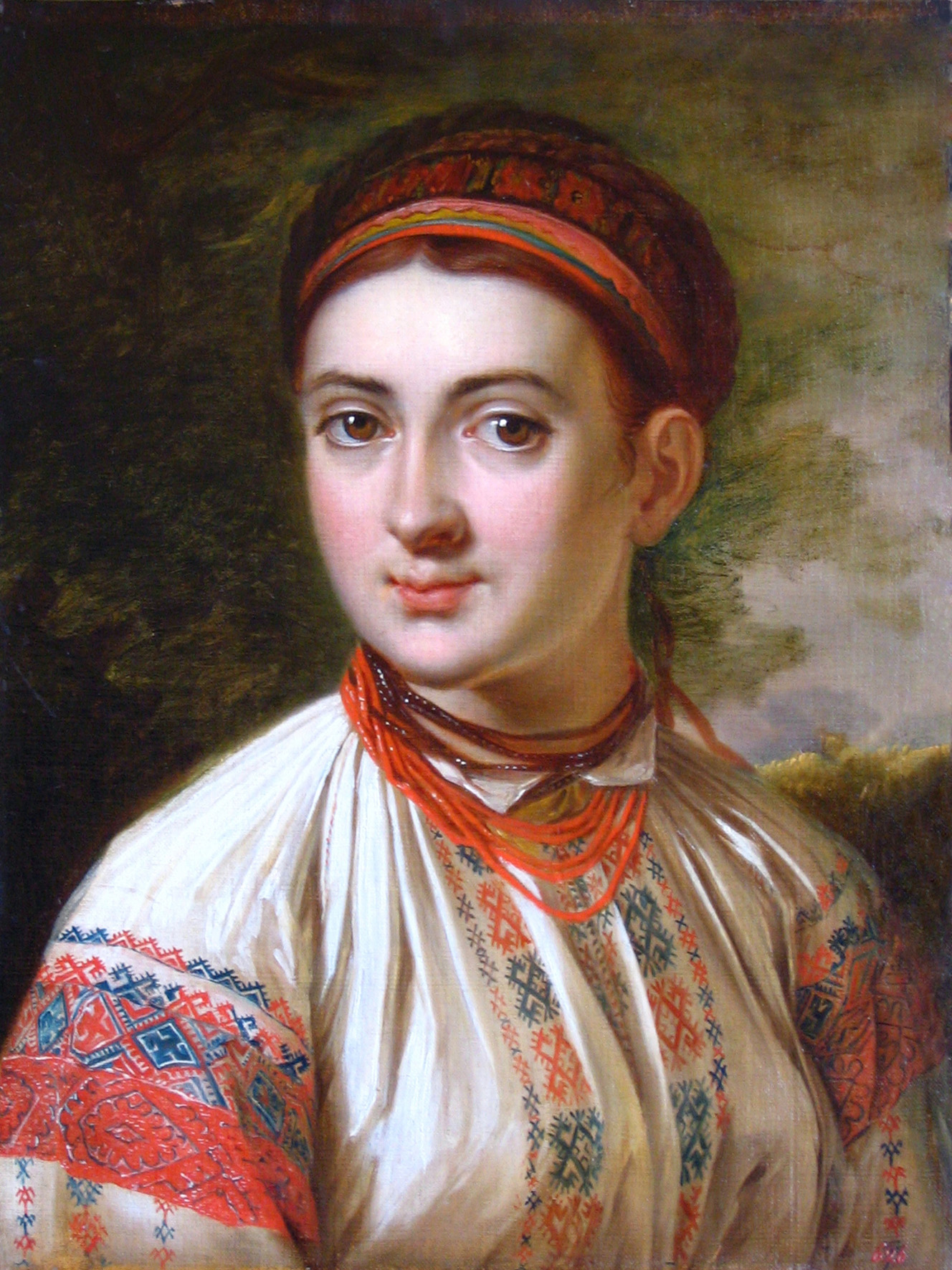
Vasily Tropinin, Lady from Podolia, before 1821. A woman in vyshyvanka

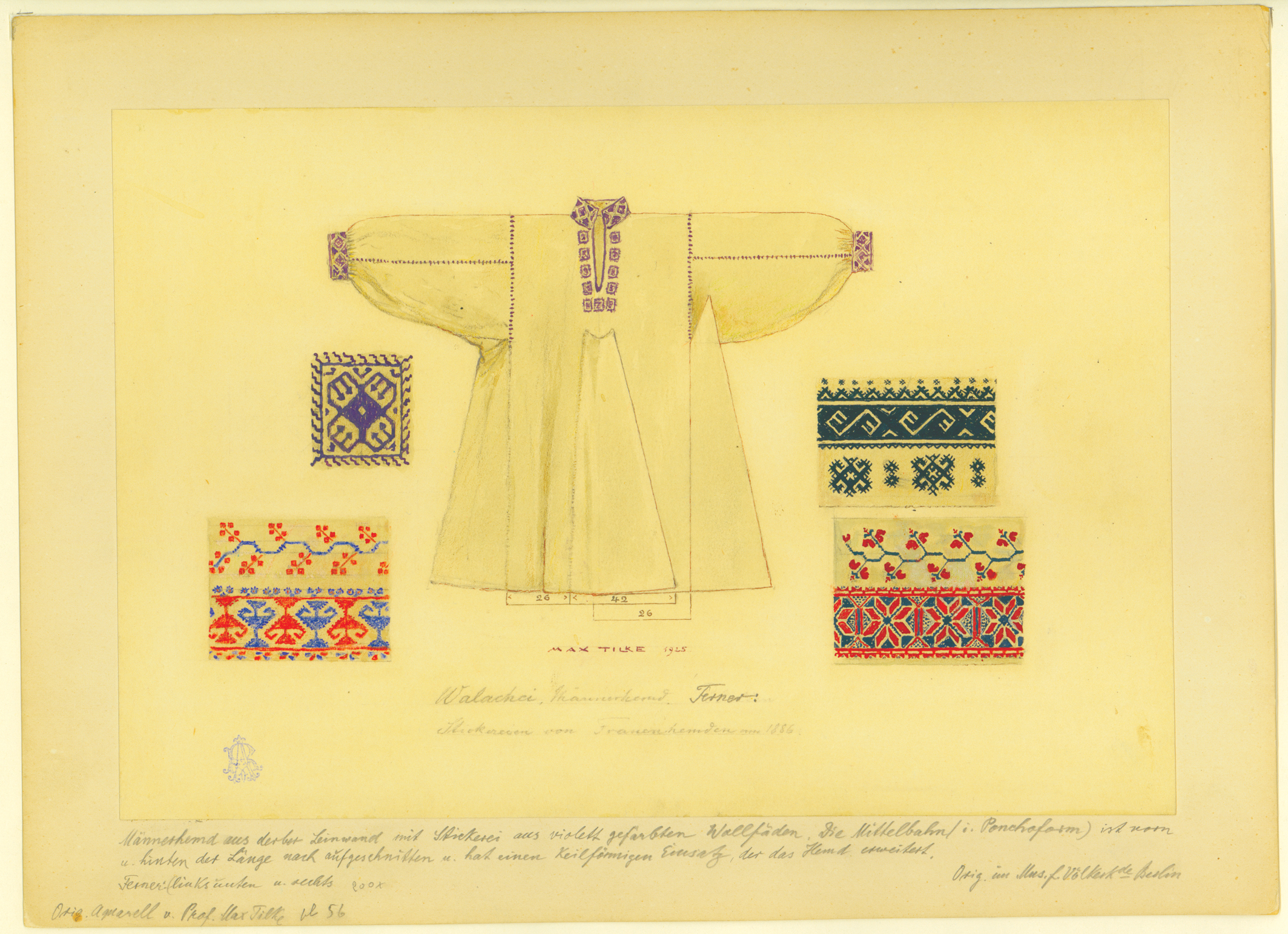
Basic structure of garment

Vyshyvanka (Ukrainian: вишиванка [wɪʃɪˈwɑnkɐ]; Belarusian: вышыванка, romanized: vyšyvanka [vɨʂɨˈvanka]) is a casual name for the embroidered shirt in Ukrainian and Belarusian national costumes. Ukrainian vyshyvankas are distinguished by embroidery features specific to Ukrainian embroidery.

== Etymology ==
"Vyshyvanka" in the meaning of Ukrainian vyshyvanka is a loanword from Ukrainian. The word is from the verb вишива́ти (vyshyvaty), 'to embroider', and -нка (-nka), a noun-forming suffix.

== Ukrainian vyshyvankas ==
=== Embroidery ===
The embroidery is a fundamental element of the Ukrainian folk costume in both sexes.The Ukrainian vyshyvanka is distinguished by local embroidery features specific to Ukrainian embroidery:

The vyshyvanka not only speaks of its Ukrainian origin but also of the particular region in which it was made. The knowing eye could detect where a person hailed from by the clothes on their back. Embroidery is thus an important craft within Ukraine and different techniques exist to suit local styles with their own particular patterns and colours. Traditionally, the thread was coloured according to local formulas using bark, leaves, flowers, berries and so on. In this way, the local environment is literally reflected in the colour of the embroidery.

— JJ Gurga, Echoes of the Past: Ukrainian Poetic Cinema and the Experiential Ethnographic Mode

In Ukrainian embroidery, black, red, and white colours are basic, and yellow, blue, and green are supplementary.

In the area which now constitutes the modern nation of Ukraine, embroidery existed already in the 5th century B.C in Scythian art. Ukraine is famous throughout the world for its highly artistic embroidery. It is important for the embroiderer today to use folk art as a source without altering stitches or colours because every change devalues a piece of embroidery and distorts it.

=== Artistic influence ===
==== Other national dresses ====
The costume of Ukrainian settlers since the 17th century had most certainly influenced southern Russian dress, with the sleeves of the chemises of girls and young women decorated with geometric embroidery in black or red.

==== High fashion ====
During Paris Fashion Week 2015, Ukrainian fashion designer Vita Kin was featured in Vogue magazine and Harper's Bazaar for introducing vyshyvanky as modern Bohemian style designs that attracted fashion icons like Anna Dello Russo, Miroslava Duma, and Leandra Medine. The designer transformed the vyshyvanka shirt into a more modern version. She kept the traditional form, but changed the embroidery borrowing some elements from Ukrainian rushnyk and home textile.

In its US May issue Vogue wrote that the vyshyvanka has "made waves far past the Eastern European country". The Times of London declared it "this summer's [2016] most sought-after item of clothing", soon following was the New York Times who advised readers to stock up on this "top of summer" fashion. French actress Melanie Thierry wore a vyshyvanka at the 2016 Cannes Film Festival. Queen Máxima of the Netherlands wore a vyshyvanka dress when visiting the 2016 Summer Olympics.

=== Meaning ===
==== Traditional beliefs ====
The vyshyvanka is used as a talisman to protect the person wearing it and to tell a story. The person who created and manufactured it is also protected by evil intentions. A geometric pattern woven in the past by adding red or black threads into the light thread was later imitated by embroidery and believed to have the power to protect a person from all harm. There is a saying in Ukrainian "Народився у вишиванці" which is translated as somebody was born wearing a vyshyvanka, so that is guarded, shielded, and defended by whoever made it. The geometrical figures represented in the Vyshyvanka originate from a single letter, word or story; intentions while embroidering a Vyshyvanka are also very important because it is used to emphasize someone's luck and ability to survive in any situation.

==== Patriotism ====
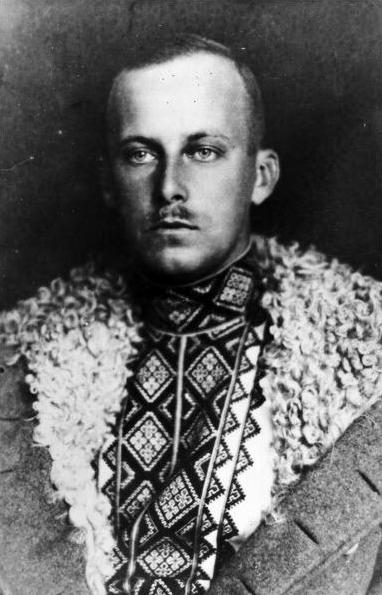
Archduke Wilhelm wearing a vyshyvanka

Archduke Wilhelm of Austria was a Ukrainian nationalist who preferred wearing the vyshyvanka and was therefore known in Ukrainian as Vasyl Vyshyvanyi (Basil the Embroidered). The Vyshyvanoho Square was named in his honor in the city of Lviv.

The vyshyvanka is not present in the traditional Russian women's costume with the sarafan consisting of a long full skirt hanging just below the arms with straps or an extremely abbreviated bodice that secures it over the shoulders.

==== Celebration ====
Vyshyvanka Day originated in 2006 at Chernivtsi National University by its student Lesia Voroniuk and gradually became international as the International Day of the Vyshyvanka. It is celebrated on the third Thursday of May. It is intended to unite all Ukrainians over the world, regardless of religion, language they speak or their place of residence. It is a flash mob holiday, which is not attached to any public holiday or feast day. On this day, many Ukrainians wear a vyshyvanky to demonstrate commitment to the idea of national identity and unity and to show their patriotism. State officials, including municipal, court, and the government officials and the head of the state, may take part in celebration.

In 2018, the Appeal Instance of the Ministry of Economic Development and Trade of Ukraine conducted a research and came to the following conclusions:

[T]he word combination "Vyshyvanka Day" means the holiday dedicated to Ukrainian ethnic embroidered cloth and entered to Ukrainian culture as the name of a national holiday of Ukrainian consciousness, patriotism, and the spirit of unity of the people symbolized by Ukrainian vyshyvanka.

The word combination "Vyshyvanka Day" invokes in minds of the citizens the only association – the holiday dedicated to vyshyvanka, which is celebrated in Ukraine, and now also abroad, yearly in a certain day of May. The Vyshyvanka holiday gained a symbolical meaning and is already an international event which spreads the idea of Ukrainian identity in the world, popularises Ukrainian culture and traditions, aids in the formation of Ukrainian national consciousness, nurturing patriotism and the unity of Ukrainian people. […]

The celebration of Vyshyvanka Day occurs yearly with participation of citizens, non-governmental organisations, state authorities, and is widely celebrated by the society by wearing vyshyvankas and arranging various events […]

== Belarusian vyshyvanka ==
The vyshyvanka is regarded as a national symbol by members of the government and opposition alike, with Minister of Foreign Affairs Vladimir Makei saying in 2017, "The patterns used to embroider these shirts have never promoted violence or evil. Quite the contrary, they promote goodness and peacefulness. They reflect the mentality of the Belarusian people, our spirit." Unlike in Ukraine, where the embroidery's features are primarily determined by region, the Belarusian vyshyvanka is embroidered according to national and personal history, and is also often used to record information. It is also commonly claimed that vyshyvanky help to ward off evil spirits.

During the 2020–2021 Belarusian protests, the vyshyvanka became a symbol of the Belarusian opposition, as well as the Belarusian national identity in general. The online website Vyzhyvanka (from vyshyvanka and Belarusian: Выжываць, romanized: Vyžyvać, lit. 'to survive') by Belarusian-Czech artist Rufina Bazlova was noted as a significant symbol of the protest movement.

== Mathematical modeling ==
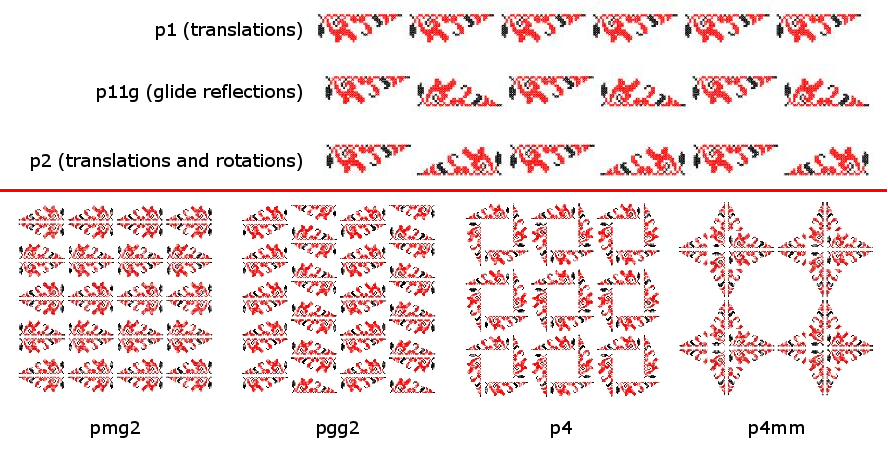
Computer-generated models of frieze groups (top three) and wallpaper groups (bottom four) that use vyshyvanka designs, adapted from a dissertation by I.O. Zasornova.

A number of researchers have developed methods for studying and formalizing mathematics of vyshyvanka embroidery. These methods include a formal language for describing embroidery patterns and algorithms for generating them, using reflection symmetry and theory of reflection groups, rotational symmetry, frieze groups that describe border patterns repeating in one direction, and wallpaper groups that describe patterns covering the entire plane.

== Gallery ==
=== Ukrainian vyshyvanka ===
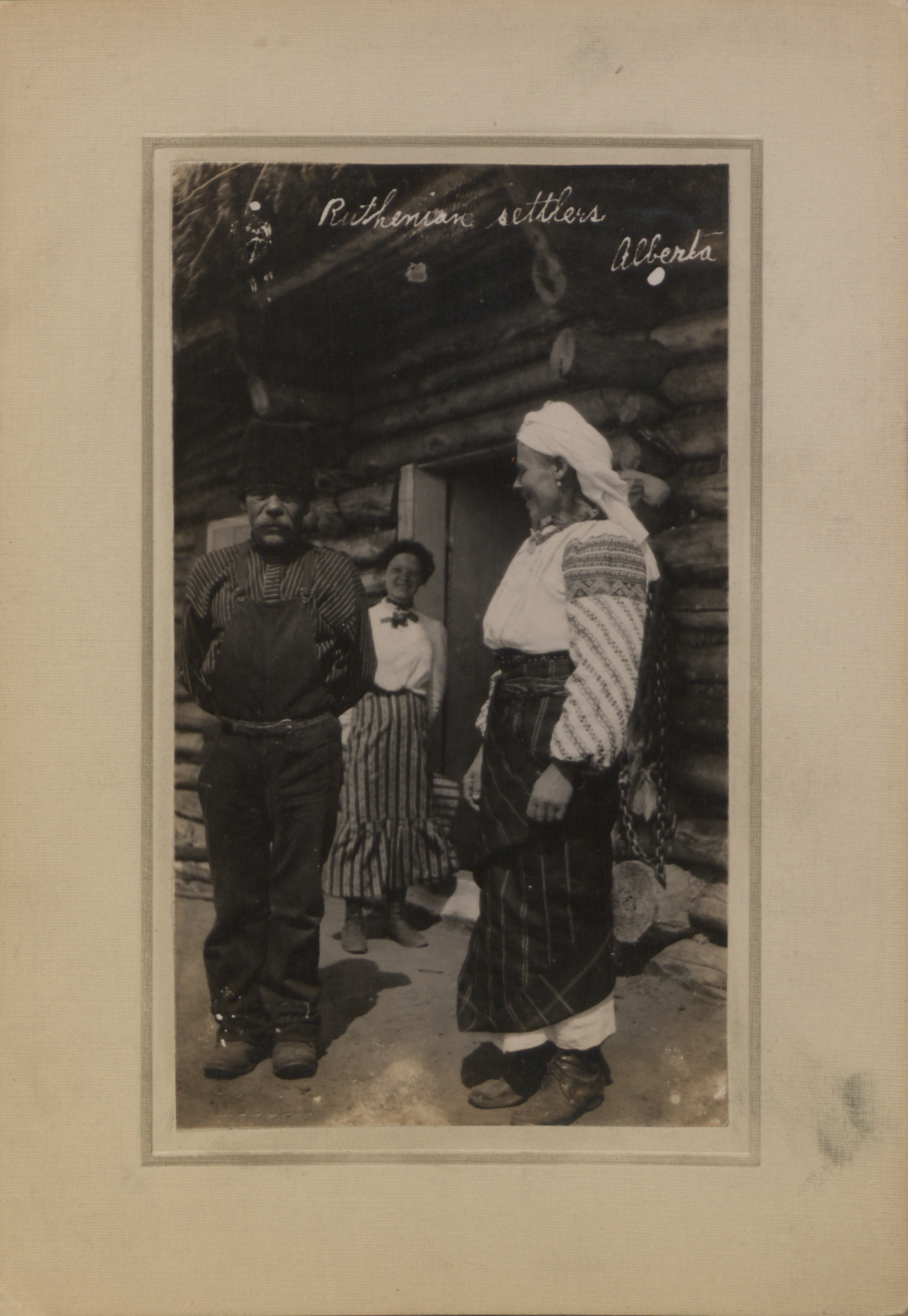
Ruthenian immigrants to Canada in 1911 in traditional garment.

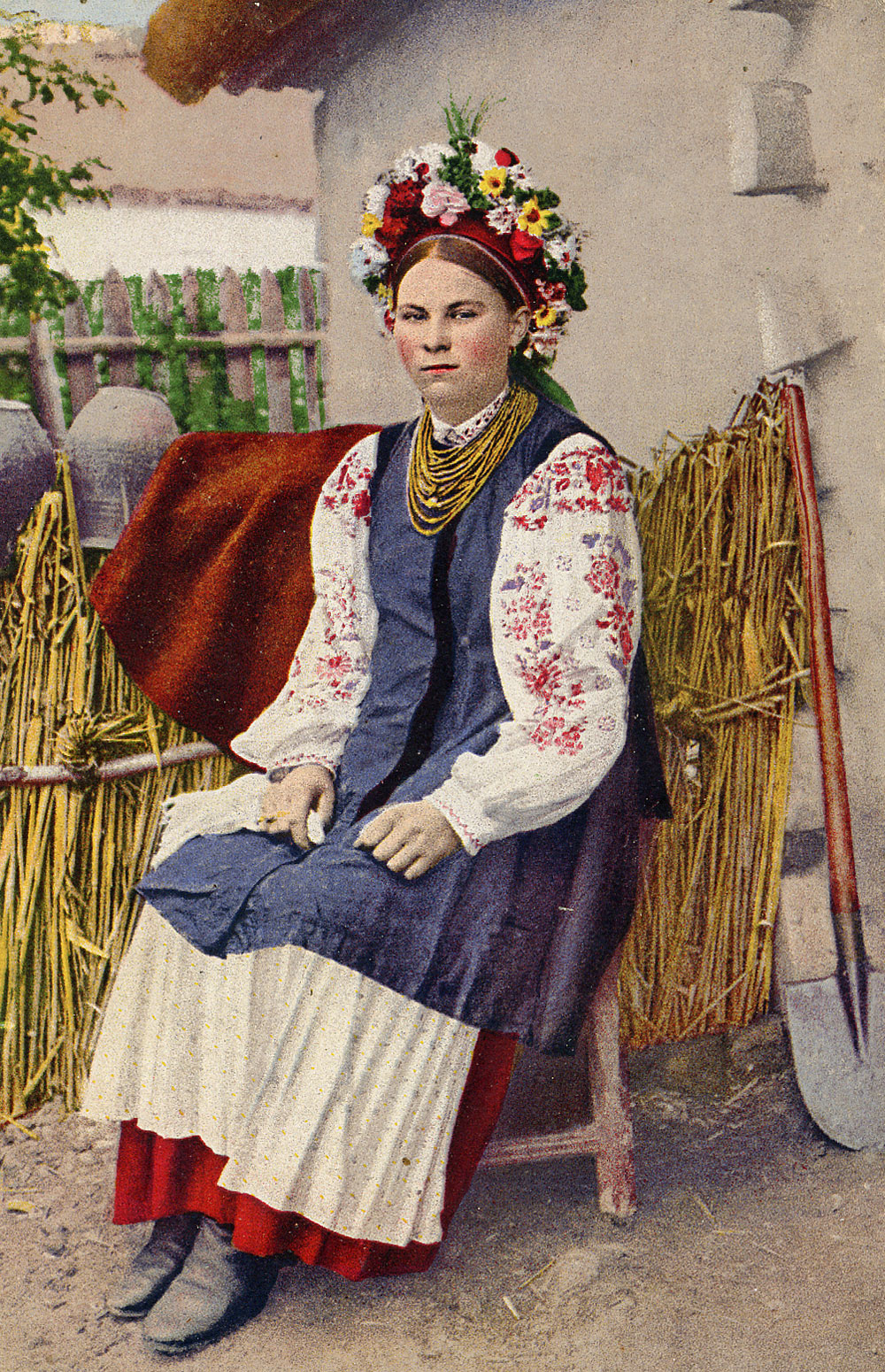
A postcard printed in 1916 featuring a Ukrainian peasant lady in vyshyvanka and traditional wreath.

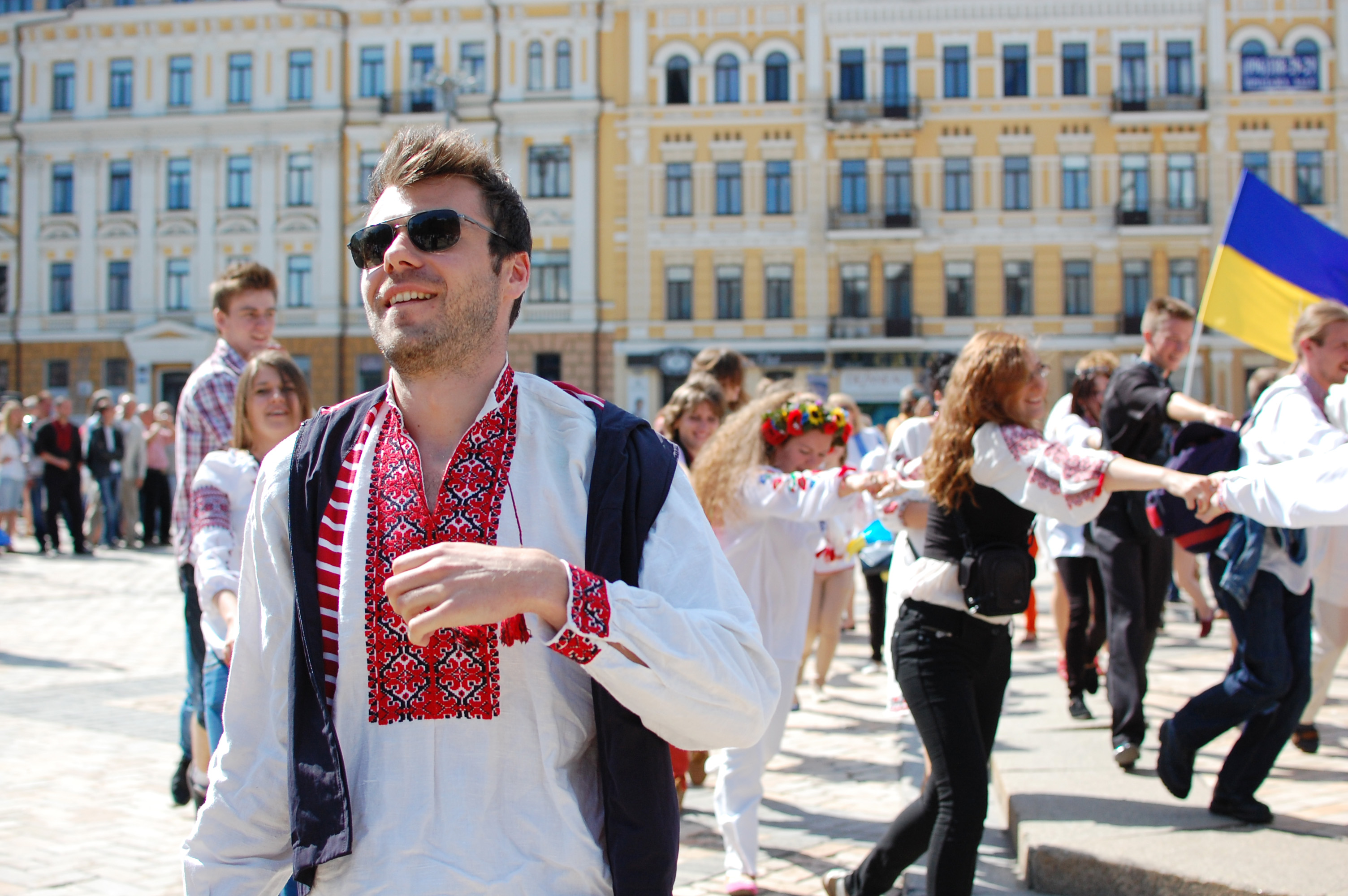
At vyshyvanka parade – a popular event in modern Ukraine.

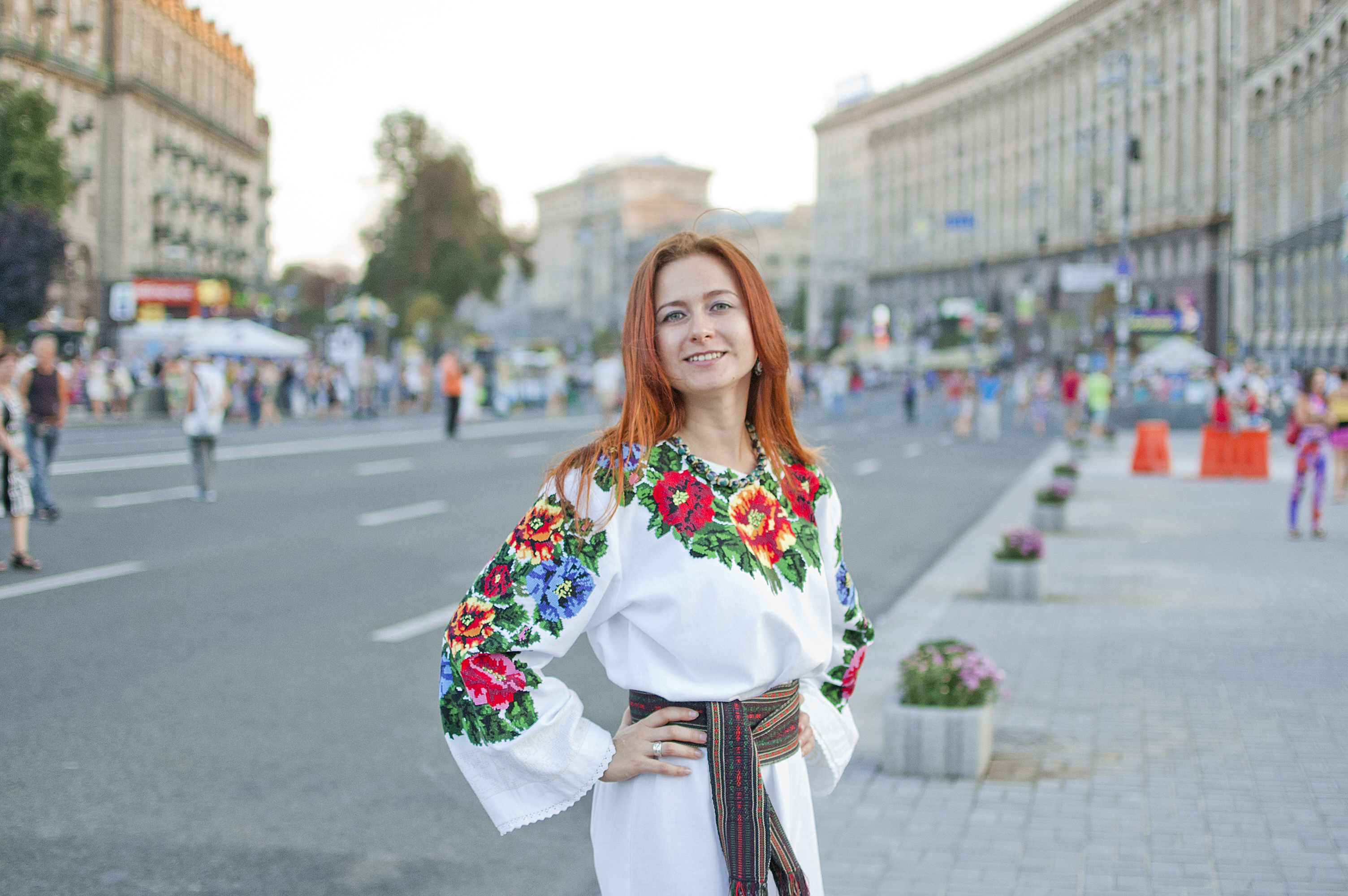
Bukovina-style vyshyvanka.

== See also ==
- Kosovorotka—Equivalent Russian men's shirt
- Romanian ie
- Ukrainian culture
- Ukrainian wreath
- Nudie Cohn
- Vyshyvanka Day
