= Defenders Day (Ukraine) =

State holiday in Ukraine

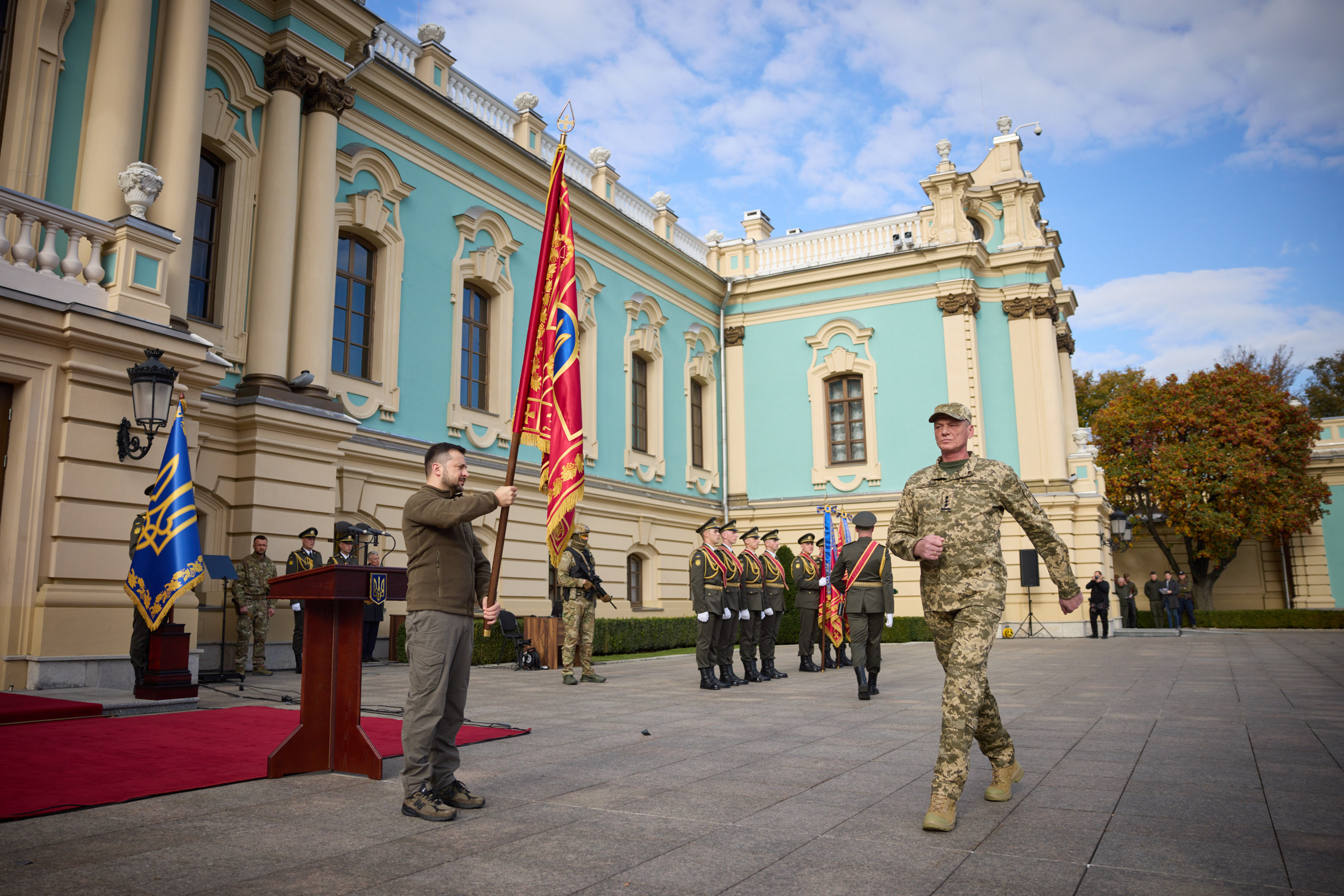
- President Volodymyr Zelenskyy participating in the Day of Defenders awards ceremony in 2022
- Official name: День захисників та захисниць України
- Observed by: Ukraine
- Significance: Celebrating the armed forces during Intercession of the Theotokos; 1 October is also the date of the founding of the Ukrainian Insurgent Army and the Day of Ukrainian Cossacks
- Celebrations: Concerts, expos, military parades, marches and festivals
- Date: 1 October
- Next time: 1 October 2027
- Frequency: Annual
- First time: 2015

Defenders Day (Ukrainian: День захисників та захисниць України, romanized: Den zakhysnykiv ta zakhysnyts Ukrainy) is a public holiday in Ukraine celebrated annually on 1 October. The holiday honors veterans and fallen members of the Ukrainian armed forces. Its first celebration was in 2015.

== History ==
On 14 October 2014, a decree by Ukrainian President Petro Poroshenko decreed the new holiday "Defender of Ukraine Day" (Ukrainian: День захисника України, romanized: Den zakhysnyka Ukrainy) due to the Russo-Ukrainian War and decommunization in Ukraine. October 14 was picked to mark the date of establishment of the Ukrainian Insurgent Army (УПА) (October 14, 1942). This decree was approved by the Ukrainian parliament (the Verkhovna Rada) on 5 March 2015. The holiday replaced the former 23 February's holiday called "Defender of the Fatherland Day", which had its origin in the Soviet Union. As the Ukrainian SSR, Ukraine was part of the Soviet Union from 1922 until Ukraine declared its independence from the Soviet Union on 24 August 1991. On 24 August 2014 (Independence Day of Ukraine) President Poroshenko had proclaimed that Ukraine should not celebrate the holidays of the "military-historical calendar of Russia" but "We will honor the defenders of our homeland, not someone else's".

According to the Kyiv International Institute of Sociology (KIIS) in 2017 only 10% of the Ukrainian population celebrated the holiday. In 2021 KIIS opinion polls showed that the holiday was popular among 29% of respondents.

On 14 July 2021 parliament officially altered the name to (Ukrainian: День захи́сникі́в і захи́сни́ць Украї́ни, romanized: Den zakhysnykiv i zakhysnyts Ukrainy), explicitly to include the female defenders of Ukraine (in Ukrainian grammar захисників is the masculine form of the word defender and захисниць the feminine form).

After the Bishops' Council was held on May 24, 2023, it became known that the Orthodox Church of Ukraine would ask the authorities to shift the Day of Defenders of Ukraine, as well as the Day of Ukrainian Statehood, due to a calendar reform, because the Protection of Our Most Holy Lady Theotokos and Ever-Virgin Mary in the OCU and UGCC will be celebrated on October 1 from 2023. On 28 June 2023 President Volodymyr Zelenskyy submitted to the Verkhovna Rada a draft law that moves the Day of Defenders of Ukraine from October 14 to October 1. Parliament approved this law on 14 July 2023 by 241 deputies supported the law. On July 28, 2023, Zelenskyy signed the draft law and Presidential Decree No. 455/2023 "On Amendments to Certain Decrees of the President of Ukraine", so the date of the holiday was finally shifted.

The Russian invasion of Ukraine that started on 24 February 2022 led to a reappraisal of the popularity of Defenders Day in Ukraine. A March 2024 study by KIIS found that the popularity of Independence Day of Ukraine and Defenders Day had both almost more than doubled (from 37% to 64% and from 29% to 58%).

== Intercession of the Theotokos in Ukrainian history ==
The chairman of the Ukrainian Institute of National Remembrance, Volodymyr Viatrovych, motivated the choice of the date for 14 October on the Ukrainian historical tradition of honouring the Ukrainian army on the day of the Intercession of the Theotokos. This holiday has been celebrated by Ukrainians since the 12th century. The holiday was especially popular among Ukrainian Cossacks, who celebrated it since at least the 17th century as they believed the Mother of God (also known as "Theotokos") to be their patroness. The fourteenth of October is also the Day of the Ukrainian Cossacks.

During the Ukrainian War of Independence (1917–1920) the military symbolism of the holiday was adopted by the soldiers of the Ukrainian People's Army.

In an effort to adopt some Cossack traditions, the Ukrainian Insurgent Army (1942–1956) chose the day of the Intercession of the Theotokos to be the official day of their establishment.

== In culture ==
Postage stamps

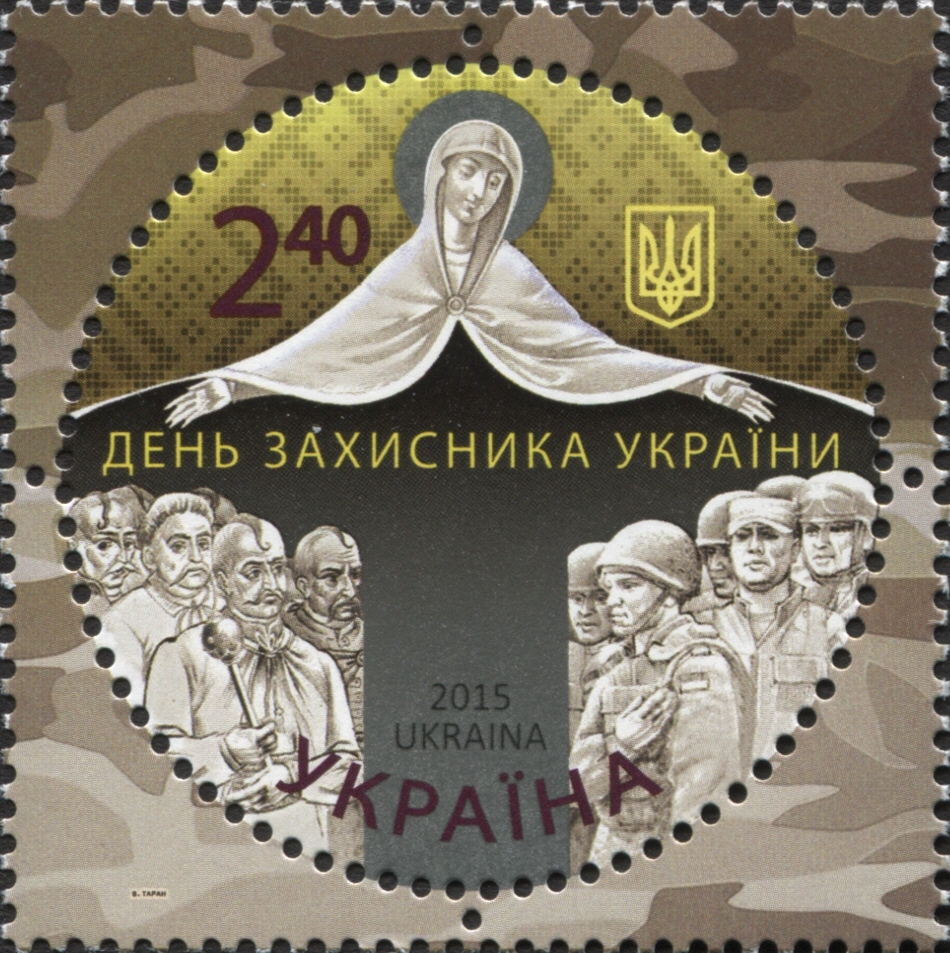
2015

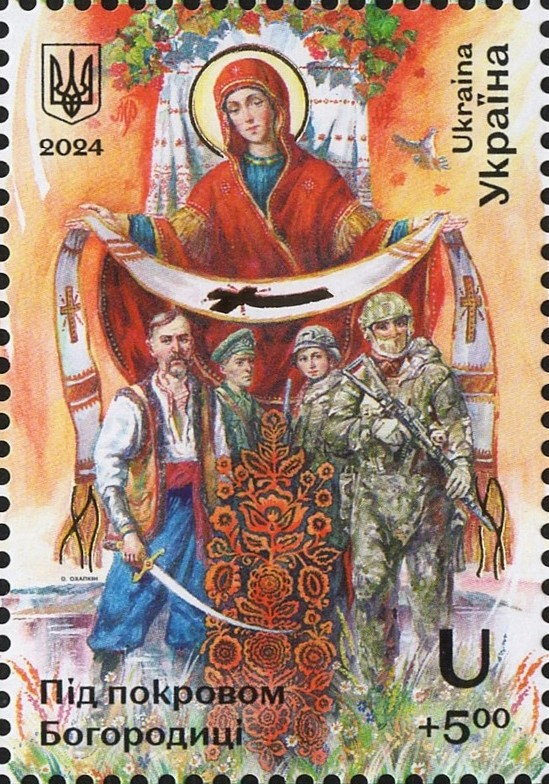
2024

- On October 12, 2015, Ukrposhta issued a stamp "Day of the Defender of Ukraine."
- For the Day of Defenders of Ukraine on October 1, 2024, Ukrposhta issued a stamp "Under the Protection of the Theotokos."

Commemorative coins

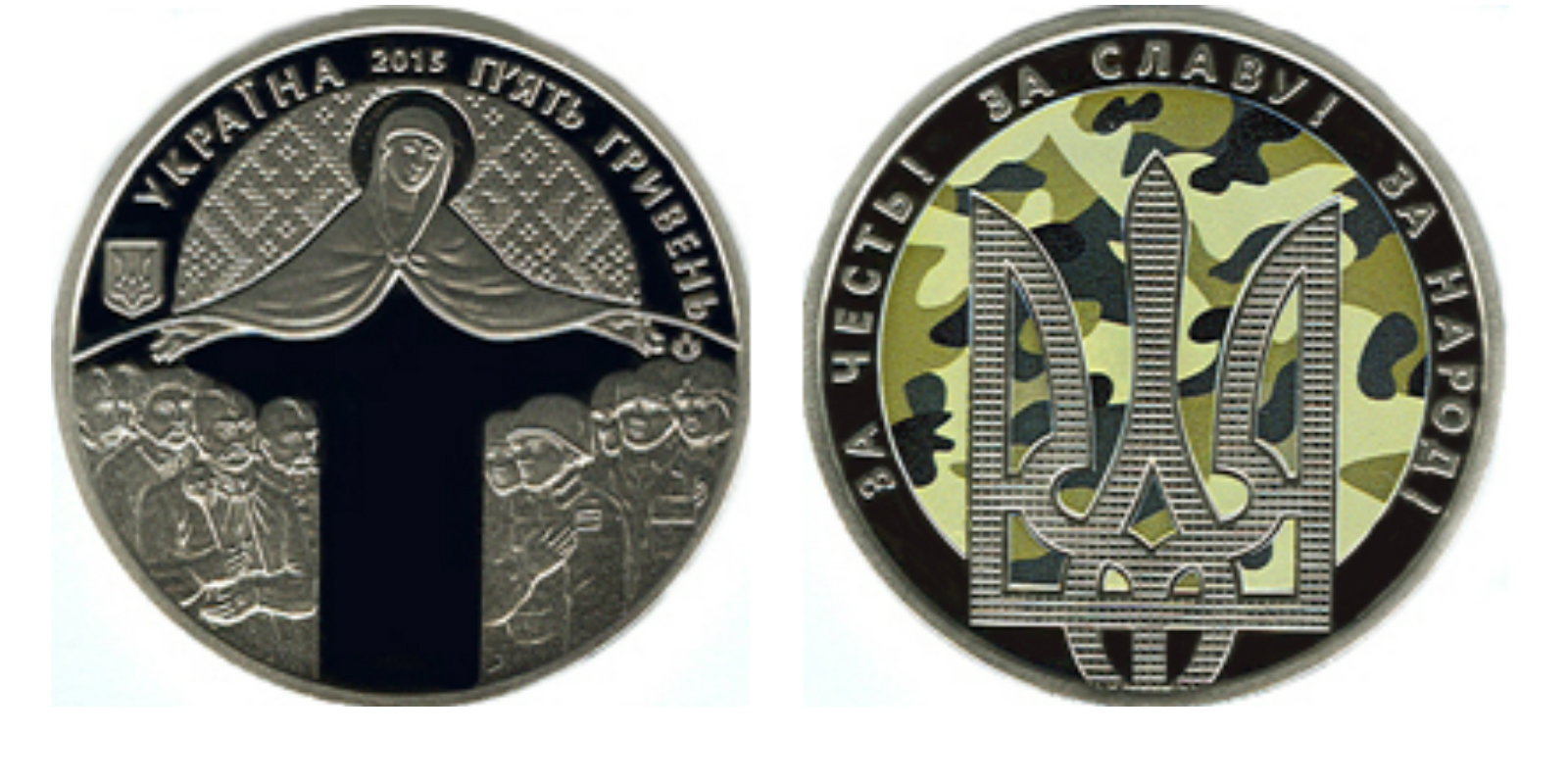

- On October 12, 2015, the National Bank of Ukraine issued 50,000 copies of a 5-hryvnia coin "Day of the Defender of Ukraine", which began the series "Armed Forces of Ukraine."

== See also ==
- Public holidays in Ukraine
- History of Ukraine
