= Vyshyvanka Day =

Holiday celebrating vyshyvanka clothing

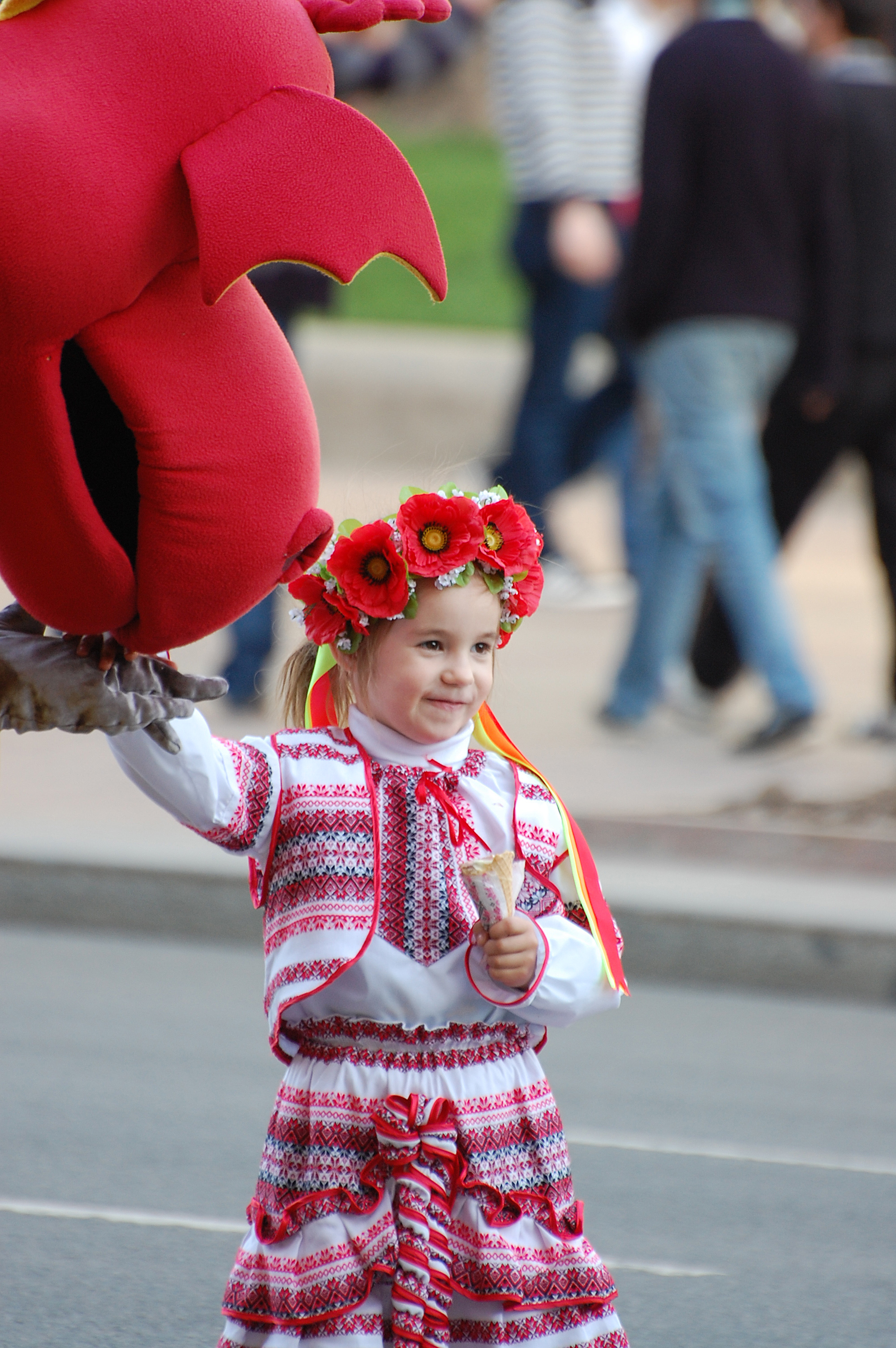
- Young girl wearing a vyshyvanka dress
- Official name: World Vyshyvanka Day
- Observed by: Ukrainians worldwide
- Type: Cultural
- Celebrations: wearing vyshyvankas
- Date: 3rd Thursday of May
- 2025 date: May 15
- 2026 date: May 21
- 2027 date: May 20
- 2028 date: May 18
- Frequency: Annual
- First time: 2006
- Started by: Lesia Voroniuk

Vyshyvanka Day is an international holiday that aims to preserve the Ukrainian folk traditions of creating and wearing ethnic embroidered clothes called vyshyvankas. It is celebrated the third Thursday of May. Vyshyvankas are, along with pysankas (traditional Ukrainian Easter eggs), one of the best known symbols of Ukrainian culture.

The holiday is not tied to any state, ethnicity or religion. It is not a public holiday.

== History ==
The idea of Vyshyvanka Day was suggested in 2006 by Lesia Voroniuk, then a student of Chernivtsi University. Voroniuk suggested that her classmates and students choose one day and wear vyshyvanka shirts all together. Initially, several dozen students and several faculty members wore embroidered shirts. But in the following years, the holiday grew to an all-Ukrainian level. Later it attracted the Ukrainian diaspora around the world, as well as supporters of Ukraine. The day of celebration was intentionally set on a weekday and not in the weekend to emphasise that the vyshyvanka is "a component of the life and culture of Ukrainians, and not an ancient artifact".

The fifth anniversary of the holiday in 2011 was marked by setting the Guinness World Records for the largest number of people dressed in embroidered shirts and gathered in one place. More than 4,000 people in vyshyvanka shirts gathered on Chernivtsi's Central Square. The same year, a huge embroidered shirt (4 by 10 metres or 13 by 33 feet) was sewn for the central building of Chernivtsi University.

Vyshyvanka Day in 2015 was celebrated under the slogan "Give the vyshyvanka to a defender". It was a campaign launched to raise the fighting spirit of Ukrainian soldiers in the Russo-Ukrainian War. The holiday was marked on a global scale, about 50 countries of the world joined the action.

The popularity of the holiday is promoted by the idea of an embroidered shirt as a talisman and the popularization of information about regional embroidery traditions in Ukraine. It has contributed to the use of ancient traditional embroidery elements in modern clothing. Embroidered Shirt Day serves as an occasion for scientific and popular materials that tell about the history and traditions of ancient and modern embroidered clothing.

== Chronicle of celebrations ==
2006: establishment of the holiday.

2007: the holiday was celebrated by students of the Faculty of History, Political Science and International Relations of Yuriy Fedkovych Chernivtsi National University. Dozens of students took part.

2008–2009: the celebration spread to all faculties of Yuriy Fedkovych Chernivtsi National University. Students and teachers were supported by colleagues from other universities, as well as libraries, schools, and kindergartens.

2010: civil servants, the mayor of Chernivtsi, university professors, and even taxi drivers joined the action this year. The initiators of the action asked President Viktor Yanukovych to join the Day of Embroidered Shirt. They wrote him an open letter. The holiday was supported in Zaporizhia, Simferopol, Lviv, Rivne.

2011: the fifth anniversary of the holiday was marked by setting a Guinness record for the number of people in embroidered shirts in one place. Over 4,000 people in embroidered shirts gathered on the Central Square of Chernivtsi. That same year, a huge embroidered shirt (4 by 10 meters) was sewn by a sewing enterprise for the central building of Yuriy Fedkovych Chernivtsi National University. Large-scale celebrations of the Day of Embroidered Shirt began precisely in 2011.

2012: on 13 December, on the holiday of Andriy, an action "Day of Embroidered Shirt at the Geographic Faculty" was held at Ivan Franko Lviv National University. On this day, students, postgraduates, teachers and staff of the faculty came to classes and work in embroidered shirts.

The tradition of giving embroidered shirts to babies born on this day in Chernivtsi was initiated. It is from this event that the events of each subsequent year begin.

2013: the holiday was marked by a university charity sweet fair, which raised almost 16 thousand hryvnias and was donated to children with cancer who are being treated at the regional children's hospital. The action continued into the night and ended with Alexander Tkachuk's author's luminescent photo exhibition "Ornaments that Shine".

2014: this year, as part of the holiday, a competition was announced for the best family photo in embroidered shirts. Among the most interesting events were the results of the all-Ukrainian photo contest "My Family in Embroidered Shirt" and the simultaneous performance by students in embroidered shirts of the national anthem throughout Ukraine. The holiday was picked up by 8 countries of the world: Canada, USA, Italy, Germany, France, Russia, Romania, Portugal.

2015: 21 May. The organizers called on all of Ukraine to wear embroidered shirts on this day as a sign of unity. The initiated action "Give an Embroidered Shirt to a Defender" aims to raise the fighting and moral spirit of Ukrainian soldiers in the ATO zone. Embroidered shirts were handed over to the military at the forefront by volunteers so that they would serve as a talisman. The holiday was marked on a global scale, with about 50 countries around the world joining the action.

2016: 19 May. On this day and on the following weekends, events were planned in various cities of Ukraine and the world.

2017: 18 May. Members of the Verkhovna Rada of Ukraine came to the session hall in embroidered shirts. In addition, a collection of embroidered shirts by designer Olesya Telyzhenko was presented within the walls of the Ukrainian parliament.

2018: 17 May. An informational campaign "Embroidered Shirt Travels" was held in Ukrainian airports.

2019: 16 May. At least half of the members of the Ukrainian parliament came to the session hall in embroidered shirts. The hosts of the vast majority of TV programs went on air in Ukrainian national attire. In various cities, people in embroidered shirts formed figures. The celebration was accompanied by the action "Embroidered Shirt — Clothing of the Free" with a demand from public activists for the release of Ukrainian political prisoners.

2020: 21 May. Mass events were not held due to the COVID-19 pandemic. The organizing committee dedicated the holiday to the Ukrainian family and genealogy.

2021: 20 May. Took place in the format of Street Ethno Music Day.

2022: 19 May. The celebration took place without mass events due to martial law.

2023: 18 May. Part of the mass events (concerts, exhibitions) started in cities of Ukraine on the eve, 17 May. Another part of the events on 18 May was dedicated to Mother's Day.
