= 2026 in Ukraine =

- Decades: 2000s; 2010s; 2020s
- See also: History of Ukraine; List of years in Ukraine

Events in the year 2026 in Ukraine.

== Incumbents ==
- President: Volodymyr Zelenskyy
- Prime Minister: Yulia Svyrydenko (until 14 July); Serhii Koretskyi (since 16 July)

=== Governors ===
- Cherkasy Oblast: Ihor Taburets (Independent)
- Chernihiv Oblast: Vyacheslav Chaus (Independent)
- Chernivtsi Oblast: Ruslan Zaparanyuk (Independent)
- Dnipropetrovsk Oblast: Vladyslav Haivanenko (until 8 January), Oleksandr Hanzha (Independent) (starting 8 January)
- Donetsk Oblast: Vadym Filashkin (Independent)
- Ivano-Frankivsk Oblast: Svitlana Onyshchuk (Independent)
- Kharkiv Oblast: Oleh Syniehubov (Independent)
- Kherson Oblast: Oleksandr Prokudin (Independent)
- Khmelnytskyi Oblast: Serhiy Tyurin (Independent)
- Kirovohrad Oblast: Andriy Raikovych (Independent)
- Kyiv Oblast: Ruslan Kravchenko (Independent)
- Luhansk Oblast: Oleksii Kharchenko (Independent)
- Lviv Oblast: Maksym Kozytskyi (Independent)
- Mykolaiv Oblast: Vitaliy Kim (Independent)
- Odesa Oblast: Oleh Kiper (Independent)
- Poltava Oblast: Vitaliy Dyakivnych (Independent)
- Rivne Oblast: Oleksandr Koval (Independent)
- Sumy Oblast: Oleh Hryhorov (Independent)
- Ternopil Oblast: Vyacheslav Nehoda (Independent) (until January 12), Taras Pastukh (Independent) (starting January 12)
- Vinnytsia Oblast: Nataliia Zabolotna (Acting, Independent)
- Volyn Oblast: Ivan Rudnytskyi (Independent)
- Zakarpattia Oblast: Myroslav Biletskyi (Independent)
- Zaporizhzhia Oblast: Ivan Fedorov (Independent)
- Zhytomyr Oblast: Vitaliy Bunechko (Independent)

== Ongoing ==
- Russo-Ukrainian War (2014–present)
  - Russian invasion of Ukraine (2022–present)

== Events ==
=== January ===
- 5 January –
  - Vasyl Malyuk resigns as head of the Security Service of Ukraine.
  - President Zelenskyy appoints former Canadian deputy prime minister Chrystia Freeland as an economic development adviser.
- 9 January – Defense Minister Denys Shmyhal and Deputy Prime Minister and Digital Transformation Minister Mykhailo Fedorov resign.
- 12 January – 2026 Kyiv school stabbing: 14-year-old Nikita Solovyov stabs and injures two people at a school in Kyiv.
- 14 January – President Zelenskyy declares a state of emergency in the Ukrainian energy sector due to Russian attacks and adverse winter conditions.
- 31 January – A technical malfunction affecting power lines running between Ukraine, Romania and Moldova causes extensive power outages in western and central Ukraine, including Kyiv.

=== February ===
- 1 February – SpaceX imposes a shutdown of Starlink satellite internet terminals across Ukraine, with exceptions for preapproved terminals by the Ukrainian defense ministry amid evidence that Russian forces were using the service in military operations.
- 2 February – Ukraine designates the Iranian Islamic Revolutionary Guard Corps as a terrorist organization for its role in crackdown of the 2025–2026 Iranian protests and support for Russia in the Russian invasion of Ukraine.
- 6–22 February – Ukraine at the 2026 Winter Olympics
- 15 February – Former energy minister German Galushchenko is arrested while attempting to flee Ukraine aboard a train amid corruption charges against him.
- 18 February – Hungary and Slovakia suspend exports of diesel fuel to Ukraine, citing attacks on the Druzhba pipeline.
- 23 February – Slovakia halts exports of emergency electricity supplies to Ukraine, citing attacks on the Druzhba pipeline.
- 25 February – A suspect in the 2025 murder of politician Andriy Portnov is arrested in Heinsberg, Germany.

=== March ===
- 5 March –
  - President Zelenskyy says he would prefer not to repair the Druzhba oil pipeline.
  - Ukraine accuses Hungary of hostage-taking and theft following the detention of two vans and seven staff of the Ukrainian bank Oschadbank by Hungarian authorities while transiting cash through to Austria.
- 6 March –
  - The European Commission rebukes President Zelenskyy over remarks that Hungary interpreted as a threat against Hungarian Prime Minister Viktor Orbán.
  - Ukraine boycotts the opening ceremony of the 2026 Winter Paralympics in Italy in protest over Russian athletes being allowed to compete under the Russian flag after the lifting of sanctions imposed over the Russian invasion in 2022.
- 9 March – President Zelenskyy confirms the deployment of interceptor drones and specialists to help protect U.S. military bases in Jordan amid the 2026 Iran war.
- 12 March – Ukraine and Romania sign a strategic partnership agreement in the defense and energy sectors.
- 15 March – Ukraine boycotts the closing ceremony of the 2026 Winter Paralympics in Italy in protest over Russian athletes being allowed to compete under the Russian flag after the lifting of sanctions imposed over the Russian invasion in 2022.
- 19 March – Former MP Lyudmila Marchenko is sentenced to two years' imprisonment by the High Anti-Corruption Court of Ukraine for bribery.
- 21 March – Archbishop Nykodym of Sumy and Okhtyrka (formerly Volodymyr Kobzar) is elected as head of the Ukrainian Orthodox Church – Kyiv Patriarchate following the death of Filaret Denysenko on 20 March.
- 25 March – Ihor Polishchuk resigns as mayor of Lutsk amid a corruption investigation against him.

=== April ===
- 18 April – Six people, including the gunman, are killed in a mass shooting and hostage crisis at a supermarket in Kyiv.
- 23 April – The European Union approves a €90 billion loan package for Ukraine.

=== May ===
- 15 May – Thirty-six countries and the European Union join the Special Tribunal for the Crime of Aggression against Ukraine.
- 16 May – Ukraine's Viktoria Leléka finishes ninth at Eurovision 2026 in Austria with the single "Ridnym".
- 18 May – A law simplifying the legalization of foreign personnel serving in the Armed Forces of Ukraine and the National Guard comes into effect.
- 19 May –
  - A suspected Ukrainian drone is shot down by a Romanian fighter jet belonging to a NATO contingent over central Estonia, prompting an apology from Ukraine.
  - Ukraine repatriates the remains of nationalist leader Andriy Melnyk and his wife Sofia from Luxembourg for an official reburial in Kyiv, which is held on 25 May.
- 24 May – A Russian air attack destroys the Ukrainian National Chernobyl Museum in Kyiv and damages the National Art Museum of Ukraine.

=== June ===
- 5 June – One person is killed in an explosion at a sorting depot of Nova Poshta in Obolonskyi District, Kyiv.
- 8 June – Former Supreme Court president Vsevolod Kniaziev is sentenced to five years' imprisonment following a plea-bargain agreement for bribery.
- 9 June – Bulgaria announces that it would stop supplying weapons to Ukraine.
- 19 June – Polish president Karol Nawrocki strips president Zelenskyy of the Order of the White Eagle, Poland's highest state honour, after Zelenskyy honored a special operations forces unit with the name "Heroes of the Ukrainian Insurgent Army", a Nazi-collaborating organization that conducted massacres against Poles in Volhynia and Eastern Galicia.

=== July ===
- 14 July – Yulia Svyrydenko resigns as prime minister as part of a cabinet reshuffle by president Zelenskyy.
- 15 July – Dismissal of Mykhailo Fedorov: President Zelenskyy dismisses defence minister Mykhailo Fedorov, sparking nationwide protests.
- 16 July – President Zelenskyy appoints Serhii Koretskyi as prime minister.
- 21 July – President Zelenskyy dismisses Oleksandr Syrskyi as Commander-in-Chief of the Armed Forces of Ukraine, replacing him with Mykhailo Drapatyi amidst protests demanding Syrskyi’s removal.
- 26 July – A Chabad center in Hadiach is damaged by fire, causing millions of dollars in losses.

=== August ===
- 3 August – A Russian soldier carries out a mass shooting in Khmelnytske, Crimea, killing four people including another soldier before being arrested.
- 13 August – Ukraine repatriates the remains of nationalist leader Yevhen Konovalets from the Netherlands for an official reburial in Kyiv.
- 19 August – The Verkhovna Rada approves the appointment of Yevhenii Khmara as defense minister.

=== September ===
- 2 September – A shootout between units of the SBU and HUR in Kyiv injures three HUR agents.
- 8 September – Ruslan Kravchenko resigns as Prosecutor General amid allegations of money-laundering involving call centers engaged in financial scams.
- 18 September – Russia holds legislative elections in occupied areas of Ukraine that it seized in 2022 for the first time.
- 19 September – The US approves a $2.68 billion sale of air defense equipment to Ukraine, to be financed using a combination of European contributions and US foreign military financing.
- 23 September – President Zelenskyy announces that two North Korean soldiers that had been captured in Ukraine while fighting for Russia had been transferred to South Korea.

=== October ===
- 8 October – South Korea recalls its ambassador to Ukraine, citing the latter's decision to reveal the transfer of North Korean POWs the previous month.
- 23 October – The White House announces that President Zelenskyy and Russian President Vladimir Putin agreed to a ceasefire negotiated by US First Lady Melania Trump in Russian-occupied Oleshky.

=== November ===
- 1 November – A cyberattack is carried out on the official Ukrainian air alert app, resulting in false warnings of a nuclear attack.
- 4 November – President Zelenskyy awards US first lady Melania Trump with the Order of Princess Olga for her personal contribution to humanitarian relief efforts in Ukraine.

== Holidays ==
- 1 January – New Year's Day
- 8 March – International Women's Day
- 9 March – International Women's Day Holiday
- 12 April – Easter Sunday
- 13 April – Easter Monday
- 1 May – Labour Day
- 8 May – Day of Remembrance and Victory over Nazism in World War II 1939 – 1945
- 31 May – Whitsun
- 1 June – Whit Monday
- 28 June – Constitution Day
- 29 June – Constitution Day Holiday
- 15 July – Statehood Day
- 24 August – Independence Day
- 25 August – Independence Day Holiday
- 1 October – Defenders Day
- 25 December – Christmas Day

== Deaths ==
- 1 January –
  - Volodymyr Marchenko, 103, mathematician.
  - Lana Chornohorska, 26, soldier.
- 7 January – Ihor Blazhkov, 89, conductor.
- 14 January – Oleksandr Kabanov, 52, MP (since 2019).
- 16 January – Olena Hrechanina, 90, geneticist.
- 25 January – Orest Salamakha, 34, MP (since 2019).
- 11 February – Viktor Zaporozhets, 78, Olympic boxer (1968).
- 14 February – Serhiy Petrov, 28, soldier and footballer (Volyn Lutsk, Ahrobiznes Volochysk, Zirka Kropyvnytskyi).
- 16 February – Semen Gluzman, 79, psychiatrist and human rights activist.
- 25 February – Roman Kofman, 89, conductor.
- 1 March – Vyacheslav Klepikov, 76, nuclear physicist.
- 3 March – Valentyna Yeshchenko, 79, political activist, MP (1990–1994).
- 7 March – Rostyslav Chapiuk, 88, politician, MP (1994–1998).
- 9 March – Oleksandr Dovhach, military pilot, Hero of Ukraine (2025).
- 15 March – Andriy Serdyuk, 87, medical scientist, minister of healthcare (1996–1999).
- 20 March –
  - Filaret Denysenko, 97, Eastern Orthodox leader, patriarch of the Ukrainian Orthodox Church – Kyiv Patriarchate (since 1995).
  - Leonid Radvinsky, 43, Ukrainian-American businessman (OnlyFans, MyFreeCams).
- 29 March –
  - Volodymyr Komarov, 62, actor, comedian, and musician.
  - Villen Novak, 88, film director.
- 2 April –
  - Oleh Avdieiev, 52, Olympic luger (1998, 2002).
  - Mykola Pinchuk, 79, footballer (Armavir, Zorya Luhansk, Soviet Union national team).
- 7 April – Ihor Mityukov, 73, minister of finance (1997–2001), ambassador to the UK (2002–2005) and the EU (1995–1997).
- 19 April – Oleksandr Polovkov, 46, footballer (Stal Alchevsk, Andijon, Zorya Luhansk).
- 21 April – Viktor Liashko, 90, MP (1990–1994).
- 5 May –
  - Viktor Kuzmenko, rescuer and civil defense officer, Hero of Ukraine (2025).
  - Yevhen Syvokin, 88, film director.
- 18 May – Stepan Kubiv, 64, first deputy prime minister (2016–2019) and chairman of the national bank (2014).
- 9 June – Yulen Uralov, 101, Olympic fencer (1952).
- 10 June – Viacheslav Bielskyi, 72, MP (1994–1998).
- 15 June – Serhiy Osyka, 71, MP (2002–2012).
- 21 June – Oleksandr Riabeka, 66, MP (2006–2012).
- 27 June – Mykola Frolov, 67, MP (2014–2019) and rector of Zaporizhzhia National University (2012–2024).
- 8 July –
  - Ihor Zvarych, 73, MP (2006–2007, 2011–2012).
  - Oleksandr Kolesnikov, 76, governor of Poltava Oblast (1998–1999).
- 15 July – Vladyslav Duyun, 49, Ukrainian-Russian footballer (Rostselmash, Baltika, FC Vityaz Podolsk).
- 23 July – Hanna Drul, 65, ceramics artist.
- 25 July – Vitaliy Dakhivnyk, 53, sculptor and art teacher.
- 18 August – Vereslav Eingorn, 69, chess grandmaster, coach and author.
- 28 August – Mykola Dzyuba, 79, MP (1990–1994).
- 30 August – Oleksandr Kasyan, 37, footballer (Fakel Voronezh, Baltika Kaliningrad, AGMK).
- 18 September – Vissarion Stretovych, 72, Orthodox prelate.
- 19 September – Mykola Karpyuk, 62, political activist (UNA-UNSO).
- 22 September – Ivan Khlanta, 85, folklorist.
- 23 October – Fedir Stryhun, 86, actor (The Lost Letter, Such Late, Such Warm Autumn, The Guide) and director.
- 29 October – Liudmyla Radchenko, 94, Olympic athlete (1960).
- 6 November – Platon Udovenko, 85, Russian Orthodox prelate.
- 7 November – Oleh Bilorus, 87, ambassador to the United States (1992–1994).
- 12 November – Vyacheslav Briukhovetskyi, 79, literary scholar and pedagogue, rector of the National University of Kyiv-Mohyla Academy (1991–2007).
