= 2024 in Ukraine =

- Decades: 2000s; 2010s; 2020s
- See also: History of Ukraine; List of years in Ukraine

Events in the year 2024 in Ukraine.

== Incumbents ==
- President: Volodymyr Zelenskyy
- Prime Minister: Denys Shmyhal

=== Governors ===
- Cherkasy Oblast: Ihor Taburets (Independent / SN ally)
- Chernihiv Oblast: Vyacheslav Chaus (Independent / SN ally)
- Chernivtsi Oblast: Ruslan Zaparanyuk (Independent / SN ally)
- Dnipropetrovsk Oblast: Serhiy Lysak (Independent / SN ally)
- Donetsk Oblast: Vadym Filashkin (Independent / SN ally)
- Ivano-Frankivsk Oblast: Svitlana Onyshchuk (Independent / SN ally)
- Kharkiv Oblast: Oleh Syniehubov (SN)
- Kherson Oblast: Oleksandr Prokudin (Independent / SN ally)
- Khmelnytskyi Oblast: Serhiy Tyurin (Acting until May 2, starting May 2 permanently, Independent / SN ally)
- Kirovohrad Oblast: Andriy Raikovych (Independent / SN ally)
- Kyiv Oblast: Ruslan Kravchenko (Independent / SN ally)
- Luhansk Oblast: Artem Lysohor (Independent / SN ally)
- Lviv Oblast: Maksym Kozytskyi (SN)
- Mykolaiv Oblast: Vitaliy Kim (SN)
- Odesa Oblast: Oleh Kiper (Independent / SN ally)
- Poltava Oblast: Philip Pronin (Independent / SN ally)
- Rivne Oblast: Oleksandr Koval (Independent / SN ally)
- Sumy Oblast: Volodymyr Artyukh (Independent / SN ally)
- Ternopil Oblast: Volodymyr Vashchyshyn (Acting, January 1–August 24, Independent), Vyacheslav Negoda (starting August 24, Independent / SN ally)
- Vinnytsia Oblast: Serhiy Borzov (until June 25, SN), Nataliia Zabolotna (Acting, starting June 25, Independent)
- Volyn Oblast: Yuriy Pohulyayko (until November 8, Independent), Ivan Rudnytskyi (starting November 8, Independent / SN ally)
- Zakarpattia Oblast: Viktor Mykyta (until September 8, Independent), Myroslav Biletskyi (Acting September 8–November 8, starting November 8 permanently, Independent / SN ally)
- Zaporizhzhia Oblast: Yuriy Malashko (until February 2, Independent), Ivan Fedorov (starting February 2, SN)
- Zhytomyr Oblast: Vitaliy Bunechko (Independent / SN ally)

== Ongoing ==
- Russo-Ukrainian War
  - Russian invasion of Ukraine (2022–present)
  - Timeline of the Russian invasion of Ukraine (1 December 2023 – 31 March 2024)
  - Timeline of the Russian invasion of Ukraine (1 April 2024 – 31 July 2024)
  - Timeline of the Russian invasion of Ukraine (1 August 2024 – present)

== Events ==
=== January ===
- 3 January – Ukraine and Russia complete their first prisoner exchange in nearly five months, releasing over 200 people on each side, facilitated by mediation from the United Arab Emirates.
- 12 January – British prime minister Rishi Sunak visits Kyiv to reiterate his support for Ukraine.
- 22 January – President Volodymyr Zelenskyy signs a decree recognizing some Russian territories, including parts of Bryansk Oblast and Krasnodar Krai, as historically inhabited by Ukrainians.
- 24 January – Korochansky Il-76 crash: A Russian Ilyushin IL-76 military transport plane carrying 65 Ukrainian prisoners of war, six crew members and three guards, crashes in Russia's Korochansky District, near the Ukrainian border, killing everybody on board.
- 30 January – Lviv Oblast becomes the first oblast to remove all Soviet-era monuments.
- 31 January – Russia and Ukraine conduct a prisoner exchange on the border with 195 soldiers being returned to Russia, and 207 military personnel and civilians being returned to Ukraine, respectively. The deal is facilitated by the United Arab Emirates.

=== February ===
- 1 February – The European Union formally approves a €50 billion financial support package for Ukraine after Hungary withdraws its veto. The package is expected to help the Ukrainian government pay pensions, salaries and other costs over the next four years with the first funds being released in March.
- 8 February – President Zelenskyy announces the dismissal of commander-in-chief of the Ukrainian Armed Forces Valerii Zaluzhnyi, replacing him with Oleksandr Syrskyi.

=== March ===
- 7 March – Former military Chief of Staff Valerii Zaluzhnyi is appointed ambassador to the United Kingdom by President Zelenskyy.
- 10 March – 20 Days in Mariupol, a documentary directed by filmmaker Mstyslav Chernov focusing on the siege of Mariupol during the Russian invasion of Ukraine, wins an Oscar for Best Documentary.
- 13 March – The European Union agrees to provide a €5 billion boost to their Ukrainian military aid fund.
- 14 March – Zaporizhzhia Nuclear Power Plant crisis: Russian-installed officials at the Zaporizhzhia Nuclear Power Plant in Enerhodar say that shelling hit critical infrastructure at the plant.

=== April ===
- 3 April – Ukraine lowers the age of conscription from 27 years to 25.
- 11 April – Russian strikes destroy the Trypilska thermal power plant located in Kyiv Oblast, permanently disabling it.
- 16 April – President Zelenskyy signs a new army draft law.
- 22 April – Russia attacks Kharkiv TV Tower using a Kh-59 cruise missile, causing the portion of the tower to fall down and disrupting the broadcasting signal in Kharkiv.
- 24 April – The United States announces a $1 billion aid package for Ukraine as part of a bill that was stalled in the US Congress for months and was recently approved. The package includes ammunition for artillery and air defense systems, along with armoured fighting vehicles.
- 26 April – A court orders the arrest of agriculture minister Mykola Solskyi on a charge of illegal acquisition of land worth $7 million.

=== May ===
- 7 May – Assassination attempts on Volodymyr Zelenskyy: The Security Service of Ukraine (SBU) says that it detained two Ukrainian government protection unit colonels recruited by Russia's Federal Security Service who were plotting an assassination of President Zelenskyy and other top Ukrainian officials.
- 10 May – 2024 Kharkiv offensive: Russia launches an offensive in Kharkiv Oblast, pushing Ukrainian forces back one kilometer from the international border.
- 10 May – Scope Ratings – the European rating agency – downgrades Ukraine’s long-term issuer rating in foreign currency from "CC" to just one level above a default rating at "C", maintaining a “Negative” Outlook. Scope is the first rating agency to cut Ukraine to this level.
- 23 May – Russia returns six children displaced by the war back to Ukraine, in a deal brokered by Qatar.
- 24 May – The European Union makes a decision allowing Ukraine to use interest funds from frozen Russian bank accounts, totaling €2.5 billion ($2.7 billion) per year.
- 27 May – Prime Minister of Spain Pedro Sánchez signs a bilateral security pact with President Volodymyr Zelenskyy and pledges €1 billion (US$1.1 billion) of military aid to Ukraine.
- 29 May – Sweden announces a package of $1.23 billion in military aid to Ukraine; the largest so far given by Sweden.
- 30 May – The United States gives Ukraine permission to strike Russian territory near Kharkiv Oblast with U.S.-supplied weapons, but not with long-range missiles.

=== June ===
- 7 June – The European Commission allows Ukraine to begin negotiations on joining the European Union.
- 10 June – The United States lifts a ban on sending U.S. weaponry to Ukraine's Azov Brigade.
- 13 June – Leaders of the G7 agree to loan Ukraine US$50 billion and use interest from Russia's frozen central bank assets as collateral for the loan.
- 14 June – Russian President Vladimir Putin announces that he is ready for a ceasefire if Ukraine withdraws from territories occupied by Russian forces and stops its accession to NATO. Ukraine rejects the offer.
- 15–16 June – World leaders meet at the Bürgenstock Resort, Switzerland to advance the Ukrainian peace process.
- 15 June – The United States announces a $1.5 billion aid package to Ukraine, focused primarily on the country's energy industry and humanitarian assistance.
- 16 June – Norway announces it will give Ukraine 1.1 billion kroner (US$103 million) to help repair its energy infrastructure and secure the country's electricity supply before winter.
- 20 June – Ukraine is moved to the top of the US list in receiving ordered deliveries of Patriot missile systems.
- 21 June – Israel and Ukraine mutually impose travel restrictions to each others' citizens, preventing reciprocal visa-free travel without an authorization permit.
- 25 June –
  - The European Union formally launches accession negotiations with Ukraine and Moldova.
  - The European Court of Human Rights unanimously finds Russia guilty of systematic violations of human rights in Crimea.
  - Russia and Ukraine each return 90 prisoners of war in a prisoner exchange mediated by the United Arab Emirates.
- 27 June – President Zelenskyy signs a law establishing English as an official language of international communication in Ukraine.

=== July ===
- 1 July – The SBU says that it had foiled a coup plot against the Ukrainian government organised by a Russian-backed group.
- 2 July –
  - Kazakh opposition activist Aydos Sadykov dies of injuries sustained after being shot in Kyiv on 18 June.
  - Hungarian Prime Minister Viktor Orbán visits Kyiv for the first time since the start of the Russian invasion of Ukraine, proposing a ceasefire plan which is rejected by President Zelenskyy.
- 3 July – NATO nations agree to grant Ukraine €40 billion ($43 billion) in military aid in 2025.
- 6 July – Fourteen people are killed and one survivor is critically injured after an oil tanker collides with a minibus near Verkhiv, Rivne Oblast.
- 8 July – President Zelenskyy says Poland can shoot down Russian missiles inside Ukrainian airspace following the signing of a security agreement in Warsaw.
- 9 July – NATO announces that it will establish a senior representative to Kyiv to coordinate with Ukrainian officials and strengthen Ukraine's ties with the bloc.
- 15 July – NATO establishes a new command centre in Wiesbaden, Germany to plan and coordinate support for the Ukrainian military as part of the NATO Security Assistance and Training for Ukraine.
- 16 July –
  - Ukrainian state electrical grid operator Ukrenergo begins emergency power shutdowns in seven eastern and central oblasts amid a record heat wave and equipment failures worsened by ongoing Russian attacks.
  - The Czech Republic announces plans to facilitate Colt CZ Group assault rifle production and the construction of an ammunition factory in Ukraine.
- 19 July – Former Svoboda MP Iryna Farion is shot and killed by an unidentified gunman in Lviv.
- 24 July –
  - Polish Defense Minister Władysław Kosiniak-Kamysz states that Poland will block Ukraine's bid to join the European Union if it does not resolve issues regarding the massacre of Poles by Ukrainian nationalists during World War II, including finding and burying all victims killed on current Ukrainian territory.
  - Three Ukrainian soldiers are killed and four others are injured in a mass shooting in Kharkiv Oblast.
- 25 July – Fitch Ratings downgrades Ukraine’s credit rating from "CC" to "C" due to its need to restructure US$20 billion in international bonds to foreign investors, increasing the nation's risk of default.
- 26 July–11 August – Ukraine at the 2024 Summer Olympics: The Ukrainian Olympic delegation wins three gold, five silver, and four bronze medals and places 22nd out of 84 countries competing at the 2024 Summer Olympics in Paris.
- 26 July – The European Union sends its first transfer of €1.5 billion (US$1.63 billion) in proceeds from frozen Russian assets to Ukraine for military and infrastructure support. The Kremlin denounces the transfer as "illegal" under international law and pledges legal retaliation.
- 27 July – Hackers from the Ministry of Defense of Ukraine escalate "massive" cyberattacks on Russia's largest banks, prohibiting any cash or credit transactions. Cyberattacks also target Russian public transport systems, internet and mobile providers, and social networks.
- 31 July –
  - Ukraine demands that Russia explain the death of Ukrainian POW Oleksandr Ishchenko in Russian captivity, who was being tried with 21 other captured Ukrainian troops for being part of the Azov Brigade that Russian prosecutors allege is far-right affiliated.
  - Slovak Prime Minister Robert Fico threatens to suspend Slovakia's diesel exports to Ukraine if the Ukrainian government continues to suspend pipeline oil transport from Russian oil company Lukoil, which Slovakia claims is causing a national energy crisis.

=== August ===
- 3 August – S&P Global downgrades Ukraine's credit rating to "SD" for 'selective' default after being unable to pay a US$34 million international bond payment, while stating that Ukraine's credit rating would fall to "D" representing a complete default following restructuring of Ukraine's debt.
- 4 August:
  - President Zelenskyy confirms the arrival and deployment of the first batch of F-16 fighter jets pledged by Western countries in Ukraine and their usage by the Ukrainian Air Force.
  - Mali breaks diplomatic relations with Ukraine following reports of the latter's involvement in an attack on Malian and Wagner Group forces by Tuareg separatists in July.
- 6 August:
  - Russia claims that Ukrainian forces have made an incursion into Kursk Oblast.
  - Niger breaks diplomatic relations with Ukraine, citing claims of support for "terrorist" groups.
  - The European Union approves a grant of €4.2 billion (US$4.58 billion) in financial aid to Ukraine.
- 9 August – The United States announces it will send Ukraine a $125 million military aid package, including FIM-92 Stinger missiles, artillery ammunition, and anti-armor systems.
- 10 August – President Zelenskyy confirms ordering a major cross-border operation inside Russia's Kursk Oblast.
- 14 August – Ukraine announces that it will create a strategic buffer zone on the Russia–Ukraine border that is "designed to protect our border communities from daily enemy attacks".
- 15 August –
  - Ukraine denies its involvement in explosions that damaged the Nord Stream 2 pipeline and accuses Russia of causing the explosions, following Germany issuing its first arrest warrant on the case towards a Ukrainian man.
  - Ukraine establishes a military administration in Sudzha with major general Eduard Moskalyov appointed as its senior commander. General Oleksandr Syrskyi says that the administration will "maintain law and order" in the region.
  - Ukrainian troops and military vehicles enter Russia's Belgorod Oblast with the region declaring a state of emergency. Heavy fighting is reportedly underway.
  - The United Kingdom says that Ukraine can use British weaponry, including Challenger 2 tanks, for its military operations inside Russia.
  - Scope Ratings downgrades Ukraine’s long-term issuer rating in foreign currency to selective default (SD), based on the moratorium on payment of Eurobonds and an associated missed bond payment after 1 August 2024.
- 17 August –
  - Germany issues an indefinite ban on requesting or providing new military aid to Ukraine that has not already been approved in order to reduce federal budget spending. The moratorium results in a "tangible dispute" within the Scholz coalition government.
  - The International Atomic Energy Agency declares that the safety of the Zaporizhzhia Nuclear Power Plant is deteriorating, following an investigation into an explosive drone strike that targeted a perimeter access road at the power plant.
- 18 August – Belarusian President Alexander Lukashenko reports that nearly one third of the Belarusian Army has been deployed along the Belarus–Ukraine border, in response to Ukraine stationing more than 120,000 troops at the border. However, Ukraine claims no movement of Belarusian troops has been observed.
- 20 August –
  - Ternopil residents are urged to remain indoors after Russian drone strikes an industrial facility, causing a large fire and an increased concentration of chlorine in the air.
  - The Verkhovna Rada passes a bill banning the activities of all Russia-associated religious groups across Ukraine, including the Ukrainian Orthodox Church (Moscow Patriarchate), following arrests of dozens of the church's clerics on treason charges for alleged involvement in Russian espionage and the transfer of a cleric to Russia in a prisoner swap. The bill is signed into law by President Zelenskyy on 24 August.
- 21 August –
  - The Verkhovna Rada votes 281-1 to ratify the Rome Statute leading to full membership in the International Criminal Court.
  - Burkina Faso, Mali and Niger write to the United Nations Security Council to complain that Ukraine is supporting rebel groups in West Africa's Sahel region.
- 23 August –
  - The United States announces a new military aid package to Ukraine, including air defense missiles, HIMARS munitions, anti-armor missiles, vehicles, and other equipment.
  - During a meeting in Kyiv, Prime Minister of India Narendra Modi urges President Zelenskyy to end the Russo-Ukrainian War, and volunteers to act as a mediator in talks between Zelenskyy and Russia. In a later national address, Zelenskyy thanks Modi but states that it is necessary for India to respect international law as well as Ukraine's territorial integrity and sovereignty.
- 25 August –
  - A British safety adviser working for Reuters is killed and two other journalists are injured in a Russian ballistic missile strike on their hotel in Kramatorsk, Donetsk Oblast.
  - President Zelenskyy publicly presents the Ukrainian-produced Palianytsia turbojet powered loitering munition, intended to serve as the Ukrainian counterpart to the Russian ZALA Kub-BLA.
  - Pope Francis condemns the Ukrainian government's ban of the Moscow-linked Ukrainian Orthodox Church (Moscow Patriarchate) and other Russia-linked religious groups as infringing on Ukrainians' civil right to religious freedom.
- 26 August –
  - Audits conducted by the Ukrainian Ministry of Defense determine that between March and July, multiple Armed Forces of Ukraine units never received nearly US$4.2 million in military aid labeled as "humanitarian aid" to bypass customs fees, prompting embezzlement and illicit enrichment investigations.
  - An F-16 fighter jet belonging to the Ukrainian Air Force crashes in action during a Russian air attack, killing its pilot.
- 27 August –
  - President Zelenskyy announces that Ukraine has successfully tested a domestically-produced ballistic missile for the first time.
  - President Zelenskyy announces that Poland will cooperate with Ukraine to return Ukrainians "who violated the law, traitors, collaborators" by illegally crossing the Poland–Ukraine border in order to escape conscription in the Russo-Ukrainian War.
- 30 August –
  - President Zelenskyy dismisses Mykola Oleshchuk as the commander of the Ukrainian Air Force following the fatal crash of an F-16 fighter jet on 26 August and replaces him with Anatolii Kryvonozhko,
  - President Zelenskyy urges Mongolia to arrest Russian President Vladimir Putin as he travels to Ulaanbaatar to make his first meeting to an International Criminal Court member state since the issue of his ICC arrest warrant.
  - NATO Secretary General Jens Stoltenberg declares that Ukraine's incursion into Russian territory in Kursk Oblast is legitimate under Ukraine's right to self-defense.

=== September ===
- 3 September –
  - At least 58 people are killed and 328 others are injured in a Russian missile attack in Poltava.
  - Five ministers resign from their positions, including Deputy Prime Minister Olha Stefanishyna and foreign minister Dmytro Kuleba, resulting in a vacancy in more than a third of the cabinet.
- 9 September – Ukraine begins the implementation of "dragon drones" that spray molten thermite on forest cover to reveal and help destroy Russian military units and equipment.
- 10 September – The Netherlands lifts all its weapon restrictions on military equipment it granted to Ukraine, allowing its army to target Russia with deep strikes while urging other nations to lift their weapon restrictions as well.
- 12 September – President Zelenskyy denounces a Brazilian–Chinese peace initiative, stating that both nations are effectively siding with Russia for allowing the Russian army to take Ukrainian territory as a means to "de-escalate" the war instead of assisting Ukraine in resisting the invasion.
- 13 September – The U.S. Central Intelligence Agency reports that due to the ongoing war, Ukraine's death rate is now the highest in the world at 18.6 per thousand people, while its birth rate is the lowest at six children born per thousand people.
- 14 September – Following a meeting in Kyiv, the foreign ministers of Poland and Ukraine call for ending social benefits for Ukrainian men in Poland, and for programs in the European Union to return them to Ukraine in order to stop draft evasion.
- 16 September –
  - The Ukrainian Foreign Ministry invites the United Nations and the International Committee of the Red Cross to join humanitarian efforts in Russia's Kursk Oblast.
  - Ukrainian officials publicly distance themselves from the suspect in the Trump International Golf Club shooting carried out against Donald Trump and warn that Russia will use the situation for anti-Ukrainian propaganda, following reports of the suspect protesting for the Azov Brigade and regularly calling for international support and troops for Ukraine.
- 22 September – President of the European Commission Ursula von der Leyen announces a loan of up to €35 billion (US$39 billion) for Ukraine in military and energy support following President Zelenskyy's drafting of a new victory plan against Russia.
- 25 September –
  - President Zelenskyy accuses Brazil and China of using their proposed peace plan for ending the Russo–Ukrainian War to boost their geopolitical power "at Ukraine's expense" by urging developing nations to agree to it.
  - Republican Speaker of the House Mike Johnson demands that President Zelenskyy dismiss Ukrainian ambassador to the United States Oksana Markarova after Zelenskyy visited an ammunition factory in Pennsylvania with several Democratic politicians, which Johnson claims represented foreign electoral intervention.
- 26 September – US President Joe Biden announces a military aid package of over US$8 billion for Ukraine and directs the Department of Defense to allocate all remaining security funds to Ukraine by his term's end in January 2025, prior to a meeting with President Zelenskyy in the White House.
- 28 September – Leonid Loboyko, a judge of the Supreme Court of Ukraine, is killed by a Russian drone strike in Kozacha Lopan, Kharkiv Oblast while delivering humanitarian aid to the area.

=== October ===
- 13 October – President Zelenskyy accuses North Korea of sending soldiers to participate in the Russian invasion.
- 22 October – Prosecutor General Andriy Kostin resigns after a number of scandals involving medical exemptions for men of military age to avoid being conscripted into the Ukrainian military.

=== November ===
- 4 November – Ukraine announces its first combat engagements with North Korean soldiers in Russia's Kursk Oblast.
- 8 November – Ukraine terminates its air service agreement with Iran that had been in place since 1993 amid the latter's support for the Russian invasion.
- 13 November – The European General Court rules against a petition by the State Border Guard Service of Ukraine to trademark the phrase "Russian warship, go fuck yourself" first used during the Snake Island campaign in 2022, citing its being a "political slogan".

=== December ===
- 1 December – Russian Forces attacks public transport in the Dnipro district of Kherson with drones, killing three people and injuring seven.
- 2 December – Russian UAV strikes a residential building in Ternopil, killing one person and injuring four.

Destructions in Kyiv after the Russian strike (20 December)

== Holidays ==
- 1 January – New Year's Day
- 8 March – International Women's Day
- 1 May – International Workers' Day
- 5 May – Easter Day (Orthodox)
- 8 May – Day of Remembrance and Victory over Nazism in World War II 1939 – 1945
- 28 June – Constitution Day
- 15 July – Statehood Day
- 24 August – Independence Day
- 1 October – Defenders of Ukraine Day
- 25 December – Christmas Day

== Arts and entertainment ==
- List of Ukrainian submissions for the Academy Award for Best International Feature Film

== Deaths ==
- 4 January –
  - Leonid Tkachenko, 70, Ukrainian-Russian football player (Baltika Kaliningrad, Metalist Kharkiv) and manager (Dynamo Saint Petersburg).
  - Oleksandr Tkachenko, 84, politician, MP (1994–2012) and chairman of the Verkhovna Rada (1998–2000).
- 7 January – Maksym Kryvtsov, 33, poet and soldier.
- 8 January – Bohdan Shershun, 42, footballer (Dnipro Dnipropetrovsk, CSKA Moscow, national team).
- 9 January – Vitalii Bilonozhko, 70, singer.
- 22 January – Anatoli Polivoda, 76, basketball player, Olympic champion (1972) and bronze medalist (1968).
- 27 March – Andriy Antonyshchak, 54, politician.
- 2 May – Sofia Berezanska, 99, archaeologist.
- 19 July – Iryna Farion, 60, linguist and politician.
- 28 October – Adnan Kivan, 61, businessman, owner of the Kyiv Post.
