= List of members of the Verkhovna Rada of Ukraine who died in office =

List of Ukrainian MPs who died in office

The following is a list of members of the Verkhovna Rada of Ukraine who died in office since its first convocation in 1990.

== List ==
Member	Party	Constituency	Date of death	Age at death (years)	Cause
Mykola Artemenko	CPSU	Cherkasy Oblast	1 June 1991	65	
Bohdan Kotyk	CPSU	Lviv Oblast	14 August 1991	54	
Vasyl Sanin	N/A	Kharkiv Oblast	12 October 1991	52	Road accident
Vadym Boyko	Democratic Bloc	Poltava Oblast	14 February 1992	29	Assassinated
Ivan Popovych	N/A	Zakarpattia Oblast	21 March 1992	53-54	
Anatoly Chepurnyi	Agrarian (Agrarniki)	Kharkiv Oblast	12 September 1993	52	
Yakiv Apter	Industralists	Autonomous Republic of Crimea	18 November 1993	52	Road accident
Roman Kuper	UCRP	Ternopil Oblast	30 May 1994	34	Stroke
Vitaly Yurkovskyi	KPU	Sumy Oblast	21 August 1994	59	
Vasyl Kornelyuk	SelPU	Volyn Oblast	8 October 1995	39	Road accident
Mykola Kashlyakov	KPU	Kharkiv Oblast	8 April 1996	43	
Serhii Drahomaretskyi	KPU	Odesa Oblast	16 May 1996	41	Road accident
Mykhailo Myaskovskyi	KPU	Odesa Oblast	16 May 1996	52	Road accident (same event as Serhii Drahomaretskyi)
Yevhen Shcherban	Liberal	Donetsk Oblast	3 November 1996	50	Assassinated
Mykola Zavarzin	KPU	Donetsk Oblast	20 March 1997	53	
Oleh Kukharchuk	Independent	Kirovohrad Oblast	12 August 1998	50	Accidentally shot by his daughter
Oleksandr Kuznetsov	Independent	Zaporizhzhia Oblast	7 November 1998	45	
Leonid Yakovenko	KPU	Proportional Representation	21 January 1999	52	
Yurik Mkrtchyan	Hromada	Proportional Representation	29 January 1999	60	
Vyacheslav Chornovil	Rukh	Proportional Representation	25 March 1999	61	Road accident
Vitaly Lutsenko	KPU	Proportional Representation	3 June 1999	62	Heart attack
Ivan Kunev	PSPU	Proportional Representation	14 August 2000	65	
Yurii Kononenko	Party of Free Democrats	Kharkiv Oblast	22 January 2001	45	Suicide by gunshot
Oleksandr Yemets	PRP	Proportional Representation	28 January 2001	42	Road accident
Oleh Oleksenko	Our Ukraine–People's Self-Defense Bloc	Zaporizhzhia Oblast	19 July 2002	39	Pancreatitis
Yaroslava Stetsko	Our Ukraine–People's Self-Defense Bloc	Proportional Representation	12 March 2003	82	Heart failure
Mykhailo Pavlovskyi	Tymoshenko Bloc	Proportional Representation	26 February 2004	62	
Ivan Chetverikov	Independent	Poltava Oblast	13 April 2004	52	
Ihor Pluzhnikov	SDPU(o)	Proportional Representation	22 June 2005	47	Suspected poisoning
Ivan Kuras	For United Ukraine!	Proportional Representation	16 October 2005	66	
Volodymyr Yeshchenko	KPU	Proportional Representation	18 January 2006	56	
Yevhen Kushnaryov	Party of Regions	Proportional Representation	17 January 2007	65	Shot in a hunting accident
Anatoly Antemyuk	Party of Regions	Proportional Representation	9 May 2007	27	Road accident
Vasyl Biba	Party of Regions	Proportional Representation	23 May 2007	59	
Viktor Prokopenko	Party of Regions	Proportional Representation	18 August 2007	62	Fall
Ivan Gerasymov	KPU	Proportional Representation	4 June 2008	86	
Mykhailo Syrota	Lytvyn Bloc	Proportional Representation	25 August 2008	53	Road accident
Valery Bukaev	Party of Regions	Proportional Representation	25 January 2009	33	Leukemia
Ivan Spodarenko	Our Ukraine–People's Self-Defense Bloc	Proportional Representation	18 December 2009	78	
Mykola Lisin	Party of Regions	Proportional Representation	17 April 2011	46	Road accident
Volodymyr Polokhalo	Tymoshenko Bloc	Proportional Representation	23 September 2011	62	Heart attack
Ihor Holovchenko	Lytvyn Bloc	Proportional Representation	7 April 2012	51	Heart attack
Volodymyr Polyachenko	Our Ukraine–People's Self-Defense Bloc	Proportional Representation	20 April 2012	73	Cancer
Oleksandr Savchuk	Party of Regions	Proportional Representation	11 November 2012	58	
Mykhailo Herasymchuk	KPU	Proportional Representation	7 November 2013	66	Lung cancer
Ihor Yeremeyev	Independent	Volyn Oblast	12 August 2015	49	Fall from a horse
Petro Vanat	People's Front	Proportional Representation	8 February 2017	79	
Dmytro Tymchuk	People's Front	Proportional Representation	19 June 2019	46	Accidental self-inflicted gunshot wound
Valeriy Davydenko	Independent	Chernihiv Oblast	23 May 2020	47	Self-inflicted gunshot wound
Anton Polyakov	Independent	Chernihiv Oblast	8 October 2021	33	Alcohol and methadone ingestion
Oleksii Kovalov	Servant of the People	Kherson Oblast	28 August 2022	33	Assassinated
Andriy Ivanchuk	Batkivshchyna	Ivano-Frankivsk Oblast	25 September 2023	50	Thrombosis
Volodymyr Moroz	Restoration	Donetsk Oblast	21 April 2025	57	
Serhiy Shvets	Servant of the People	Kyiv Oblast	28 May 2025	48	
Yaroslav Rushchyshyn	Holos	Lviv Oblast	24 July 2025	57	Motorcycle accident
Andriy Parubiy	European Solidarity	Lviv Oblast	30 August 2025	54	Assassinated
Oleksandr Kabanov	Servant of the People	Proportional Representation	14 January 2026	52	
Orest Salamakha	Servant of the People	Lviv Oblast	25 January 2026	34	Traffic collision
