= Kuzmenko =

Kuzmenko (Ukrainian: Кузьменко) is a Ukrainian-language patronymic surname derived from the given name Kuzma. Its Belarusian equivalent is Kuzmienka (Belarusian: Кузьменка).

The surname may refer to the following notable people:

- Andrei Kuzmenko (born 1996), Russian ice hockey player
- Andriy Kuzmenko (1968–2015), Ukrainian singer and poet
- Anna Kuzmenko (born 2004), French figure skater
- Halyna Kuzmenko (1896–1978), Ukrainian anarchist
- Igor Kuzmenko (born 1970), Russian footballer
- Ivan Kuzmenko (born 1995), Russian swimmer
- Larysa Kuzmenko (born 1956), Canadian composer
- Lizaveta Kuzmenka (born 1987), Belarusian alpine skier
- Serhiy Kuzmenko (born 1975), Ukrainian politician
- Valeria Kuzmenko Titova (1934–2010), Soviet-Ukrainian tennis player
- Viktor Kuzmenko (1984–2026), Ukrainian rescuer and civil defense officer

== See also ==
- Kuzmenkov, a Russian surname
