= Vasyl Kulia =

Ukrainian graphic artist and painter

Vasyl Serhiiovych Kulia (Ukrainian: Василь Сергійович Куля; born 4 September 1948) is a Ukrainian graphic artist, painter and restorer. He has been a member of the National Union of Artists of Ukraine since 1989 and has participated in republican, all-Union and international art exhibitions since 1971.

== Early life and education ==
Vasyl Kulia was born on 4 September 1948 in Kapustyntsi village, Kyiv Oblast, Ukraine. He studied at the Kyiv Institute of Decorative and Applied Art and Design 1966–1967 and graduated from the Kyiv printing faculty of the Ukrainian Printing Institute in 1973.

== Artistic career ==
Vaysl Kulia worked in graphic art, painting and restoration. His artistic practice has included easel and book graphics, painting and sacred art. He collaborated with Kyiv publishing houses including Dnipro, Mystetstvo, Naukova Dumka and Radianskyi Pysmennyk.

His book illustration work included Volodymyr Yavorivsky's novel Avtoportret z uiavy (1981) and Ivan Spodarenko's collection of short stories Kolodiaz bilia moiei khaty (1984).

Vasyl also restored iconostases for churches in Ukraine, Belarus and Lithuania. His restoration projects included churches in Irpin, Hlevakha, Dubrovytsia, Druskininkai and Vilnius.

== Works and collections ==
Among Vasyl Kulia's graphic series are Kozak Mamai (1970), Heroi narodnyi (1971), Tvoi dity, Ukraino (1972–1973), works inspired by the poetry of Taras Shevchenko (1976), Slavic Mythology (1983–1984) and Prominent Figures of Kyivan Rus (1988). His later works include the painting cycles Ancient Kyiv (2001–2002), From the Depths of the Centuries (2006–2007) and Cherkasy Region (2008–2011).

Works by Vasyl Kulia are held in collections including the Khortytsia National Reserve, historical museums in Dnipro and Yahotyn, the Yahotyn Art Gallery and the Kateryna Bilokur Museum-Estate.

== Collecting and preservation of Ukrainian art ==
In addition to his own artistic practice, Vasyl Kulia has collected and preserved works of Ukrainian folk and naïve art. In 2014, the newspaper Ukraina Moloda described him as a professional artist, collector and restorer and reported that several works from his collection were exhibited in Zberezhene sontse. Ukrainskyi naiv XX stolittia at Saint Sophia of Kyiv.

The Ivan Honchar Museum has documented Kulia's discovery in his native region of two paintings by Ukrainian folk artist Panas Yarmolenko. Kulia donated one of the works, a portrait of a young woman in a wreath, to the museum.
