= Oleksii Kaida =

Ukrainian politician (born 1971)

- Олексій Кайда
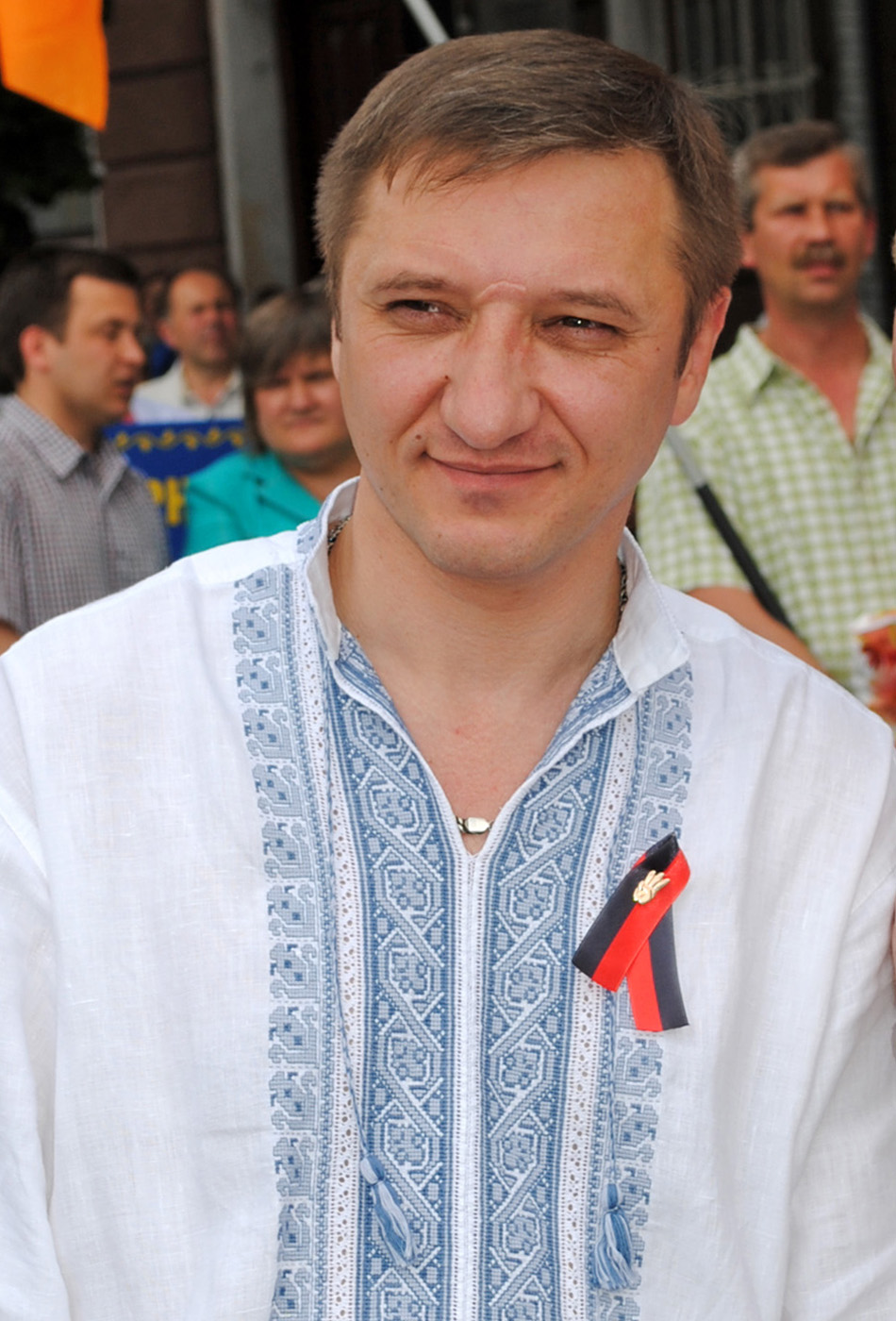
- Kaida in 2011

People's Deputy of Ukraine
- In office 12 December 2012 – 27 November 2014
- Preceded by: Constituency established
- Succeeded by: Taras Pastukh
- Constituency: Ternopil Oblast, No. 163

Head of the Ternopil Oblast Council
- In office 26 March 2009 – 23 November 2012
- Preceded by: Mykhailo Mykolenko
- Succeeded by: Vasyl Khominets

Personal details
- Born: 27 February 1971 (age 55) Berdiansk, Ukrainian SSR, Soviet Union (now Ukraine)
- Party: Svoboda
- Other political affiliations: People's Movement of Ukraine
- Spouse: Olena Bilosiuk (m. 2013; div. 2016)
- Education: Lviv Polytechnic

Military service
- Allegiance: Ukraine
- Years of service: 2015; 2022–present
- Unit: Sich Battalion; Svoboda Legion; 45th Artillery Brigade
- Battles/wars: Russo-Ukrainian War; War in Donbas; Russian invasion of Ukraine; Battle of Kyiv; Battle of Kupiansk; Battle of Bakhmut; Battle of Donbas

Oleksii Petrovych Kaida (Ukrainian: Олексій Петрович Кайда; born 27 February 1971) is a Ukrainian politician from Svoboda who served as a People's Deputy of Ukraine from Ukraine's 163rd electoral district from 2012 to 2014. Prior to his election, he was Chairman of the Ternopil Oblast Council from 2009 to 2012.

== Early life and career ==
Oleksii Petrovych Kaida was born on 27 February 1971 in the city of Berdiansk in southeastern Ukraine. Following his graduation from school in 1988 he began working at a shoe factory. He helped to organise the People's Movement of Ukraine and the Taras Shevchenko Society for the Ukrainian Language in Berdiansk, as well as the western Ukrainian city of Lviv. From 1989 to 1994 he studied at Lviv Polytechnic, graduating with a specialisation in system engineering. He joined the Social-National Party of Ukraine in 1994.

== Political career ==
Kaida first attempted to join the Verkhovna Rada (parliament of Ukraine) during the 1998 election, as part of the Less Words bloc's proportional representation list. He was not elected. He was a parliamentary aide to Oleh Tyahnybok, who was elected from Less Words and later from the Our Ukraine Bloc, from 1999 to 2006.

Kaida was elected to the Lviv Oblast Council during the 2006 Ukrainian local elections. He partook in the 2007 Ukrainian parliamentary election on the proportional representation list of the Svoboda party, although he was not elected, and he continued to serve in the Lviv Oblast Council until 2009, when he was elected to the Ternopil Oblast Council. He was selected as the council's chairman, and continued to hold the office until 2012.

=== People's Deputy of Ukraine ===
Kaida again ran to become a People's Deputy of Ukraine during the 2012 Ukrainian parliamentary election, running in Ukraine's 163rd electoral district in the city of Ternopil. He was successfully elected with 56.65% of the vote, defeating lieutenant general of the Militsiya and Ukrainian Democratic Alliance for Reform candidate Vitalii Maksymov, who gathered 15.18%. He was deputy leader of Svoboda in the 7th Ukrainian Verkhovna Rada.

Along with mayor of Ternopil Serhiy Nadal, Kaida visited Pope Benedict XVI in May 2011. The two were permitted a private audience with the Pope, during which they asked him to give blessings to Svoboda in their efforts to increase spirituality in Ternopil Oblast.

Kaida ran for re-election in the 2014 Ukrainian parliamentary election, again running in the 163rd electoral district. He was defeated after gathering only 23% of the vote, as part of a broader societal reaction against Svoboda due to a decrease in political polarisation.

=== Later political career ===
Kaida has attempted on multiple occasions to make a comeback following his electoral defeat. In 2015, he was appointed deputy mayor of Ivano-Frankivsk for land and architectural issues, and he unsuccessfully sought election to the Kyiv City Council. He again ran in the 2019 Ukrainian parliamentary election as the 17th candidate on the proportional representation list of Svoboda.

Kaida was briefly detained on 12 December 2019 after getting into a fight with incumbent People's Deputy Andriy Bohdanets in the Verkhovna Rada building. Kaida, along with fellow former People's Deputies from Svoboda Eduard Leonov and Ihor Miroshnychenko, punched Bohdanets until he was hospitalised with a concussion. The fight occurred in response to Bohdanets's support for legalising the private sale of land.

== Military career ==
Following his defeat, Kaida was mobilised into the Armed Forces of Ukraine in 2015, alongside other former People's Deputies from Svoboda. He fought in the war in Donbas, at various points serving in the Sich Battalion or the Svoboda Legion. He was one of seven former People's Deputies from Svoboda to fight in the Sich Battalion. He served for 14 months as an artilleryman before being demobilised.

After the beginning of the Russian invasion of Ukraine Kaida rejoined the Armed Forces and took part in the battle of Kyiv. He later joined the 45th Artillery Brigade, and fought in the battles of Kupiansk, Bakhmut, and Lyman. On 25 December 2023, he was awarded the Silver Cross of the Commander-in-Chief of the Armed Forces of Ukraine by Valerii Zaluzhnyi.
