= Zvarych =

Zvarych (Ukrainian: Зварич) is a Ukrainian surname. Notable people with the surname include:

- Iryna Zvarych (born 1983), Ukrainian footballer
- Roman Zvarych (born 1953), Ukrainian politician
- Ihor Zvarych (born 1952), Ukrainian politician, Professor, Doctor of Political Science
