= 2027 in Ukraine =

- Decades: 2000s; 2010s; 2020s
- See also: History of Ukraine; List of years in Ukraine

Events in the year 2027 in Ukraine.

== Events ==
=== Predicted and scheduled ===
- 2 August – Solar eclipse of August 2, 2027 (partial eclipse)

== Holidays ==
- 1 January – New Year's Day
- 8 March – International Women's Day
- 9 March – International Women's Day Holiday
- 2 May – Easter Sunday
- 3 May – Easter Monday
- 1 May – Labour Day
- 8 May – Day of Remembrance and Victory over Nazism in World War II 1939 – 1945
- 20 June – Whitsun
- 21 June – Whit Monday
- 28 June – Constitution Day
- 29 June – Constitution Day Holiday
- 15 July – Statehood Day
- 24 August – Independence Day
- 25 August – Independence Day Holiday
- 1 October – Defenders Day
- 25 December – Christmas Day
