= Yakiv Apter =

Ukrainian politician (1940–1993)

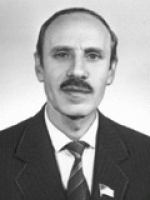

Member of Verkhovna Rada
- In office 15 May 1990 – 19 November 1993

Personal details
- Born: 30 November 1940 Gorky, Soviet Union
- Died: November 18, 1993 (aged 52) Bilohlynka, Crimea, Ukraine
- Occupation: Politician

Yakiv Mykhailovych Apter (November 30, 1940, Gorky – November 18, 1993, Bilohlynka) was a Ukrainian politician and the member of the Verkhovna Rada of the 1st convocation from May 15, 1990, to November 1993.

== Biography ==
Yakiv Apter was born on November 30, 1940, in Gorky, Russian SFSR, into a Jewish family. At the age of four, he became an orphan and was raised in orphanages. In 1956, Apter started his career as a locksmith and worked as a locksmith at the 8th State Bearing Plant in Kharkiv. In 1959, he began his military service and later returned to work as a locksmith at the same plant. From 1963 to 1968, Yakiv Apter studied at the Gorky Institute of Water Transport Engineers, specializing in shipbuilding. For the next five years, he worked in his field at the Kerch Shipbuilding Plant named after B.E. Butoma.

In 1973, Apter became the deputy head of the production and dispatch department of the Kerch Ship Repair Plant, and in 1975, he became the deputy head of the Kerch Metallurgical Plant named after V. Volkov. He remained with this enterprise, initially becoming the head of the production department, and director in 1987.

Before the elections to the Verkhovna Rada of the Ukrainian SSR in March 1990, the labor collective of the Kerch Metallurgical Plant nominated Apter as a candidate for the position of People's Deputy of Ukraine in the Crimean electoral district #246. In the second round, held on March 18, Apter received 74.92% of the voters' support and thus obtained a deputy's mandate.

In the Verkhovna Rada, Apter was part of the Industrialists group and worked in the Committee on Economic Reform and Management of the National Economy. He also actively participated in Crimean politics.

On November 18, 1993, Apter was traveling in a Volga from Simferopol Airport to Simferopol. Near the village of Bilohlynka, the car was involved in a car accident, and Apter, along with the driver and four people, died. On November 23, he was buried in Kerch.

== See also ==
- List of members of the Verkhovna Rada of Ukraine who died in office
