= Bohdan Matkivskyi =

Ukrainian politician

- Богдан Матківський
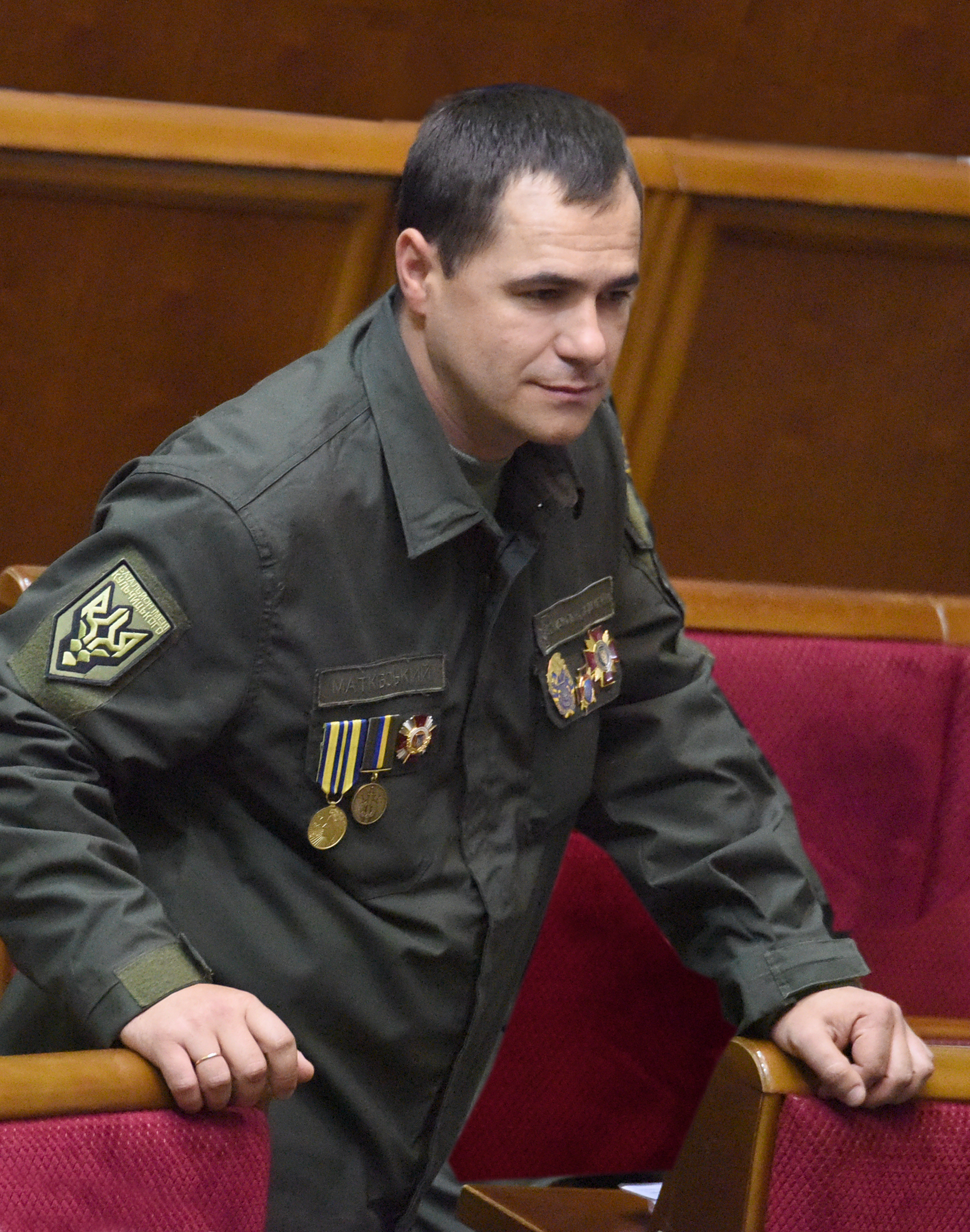

People's Deputy of Ukraine
- In office 27 November 2014 – 29 August 2019
- Preceded by: Roman Ilyk
- Succeeded by: Orest Salamakha
- Constituency: Lviv Oblast, No. 121

Personal details
- Born: 14 February 1980 (age 46) Truskavets, Ukrainian SSR, Soviet Union (now Ukraine)
- Party: Independent
- Education: Drohobych Ivan Franko State Pedagogical University

Bohdan Myronovych Matkivskyi (Ukrainian: Богдан Миронович Матківський; born 14 February 1980) is a Ukrainian politician who served as a People's Deputy of Ukraine in the 8th Ukrainian Verkhovna Rada, representing Ukraine's 121st electoral district.

== Early life and career ==
Matkivskyi graduated the 9th form in secondary school No. 3, then studied at the Heroes of Kruty Lviv Military Lyceum. He graduated from vocational training school No. 19 with honours, and graduated from the Ivan Franko State Pedagogical University's faculty of management and marketing, but did not pursue a pedagogical nor economic career. From 2008, Matkivskyi has been involved in social-economic programs, and he additionally was general director of Zet-Avtor PLC.

== Political career ==
During Euromaidan, Matkivskyi was a deputy of the 12th sotnia of the Maidan Self-Defence. In February 2014, Bohdan Matkivskyi was appointed a coordinator of self-defence in Drohobych by Andriy Parubiy. He is a commander of the 2nd section of the 2nd company command of the 1st battalion of Ukrainian National Army.

Matkivskyi is one of the founders of the People's Control Civic Movement political party.

In the 2014 Ukrainian parliamentary election, Matkivskyi was elected as a People's Deputy of Ukraine from Ukraine's 121st electoral district, located in Lviv Oblast. Matkivskyi won his district with 26,924 votes, 23.62% of the total vote. He assumed office on 27 November 2014. He is an independent. He was secretary of the Verkhovna Rada Committee on the questions of economic policy, and a member of groups for inter-parliamentary cooperation with Norway, Finland, Vietnam, India, and China.

In the 2019 Ukrainian parliamentary election, Matkivskyi failed to get reelected in 121st electoral district, this time he was a candidate for the party Civil Position.

== Honours and awards ==
Ukraine's President's Honour — anniversary medal «25 Years of Ukraine’s Independence» (2016).
