= Andriy Boychuk =

Ukrainian politician and public activist

- Андрій Бойчук
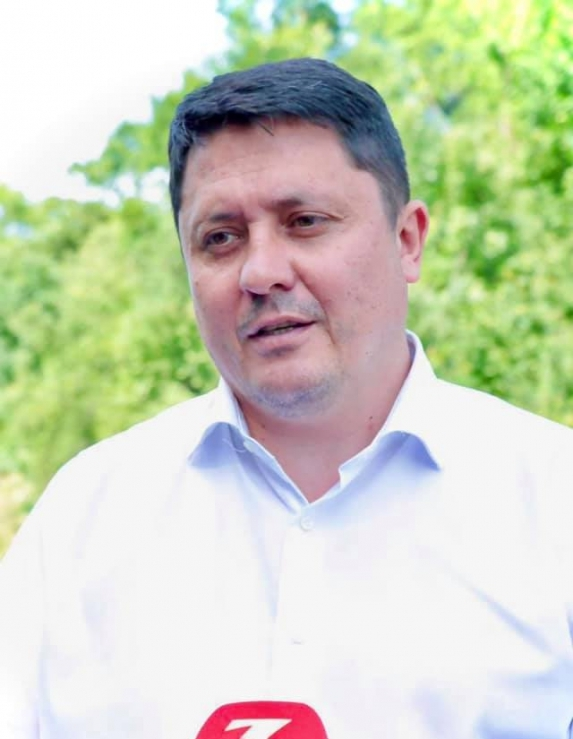

Governor of Ivano-Frankivsk Oblast
- In office 24 December 2020 – 8 July 2021
- Preceded by: Mariya Savka (acting)
- Succeeded by: Svitlana Onyschuk

Personal details
- Born: Andriy Mykhailovych Boychuk; 15 April 1976 (age 50) Ivano-Frankivsk, Ukraine, Soviet Union

Andriy Mykhailovych Boychuk (Ukrainian: Андрій Михайлович Бойчук; born on 15 April 1976), is a Ukrainian politician and public activist, who had served as the governor of Ivano-Frankivsk Oblast from 2020 to 2021. He had been one of the leaders of the Kyokushinkai Karate Federation of Ukraine.

== Biography ==
Andriy Boychuk was born on 15 April 1976 in Ivano-Frankivsk.

From March 1994 to August 1996 he was a gas station operator at Ivano-Frankivsk Petroleum. In September 1996 to September 2000, he was the operator of the gas station LLC "Dobrotsvit".

In 1995 to 2000, he studied at the Ivano-Frankivsk Technical University of Oil and Gas, majoring in "Gas and oil pipelines and gas and oil storage facilities", mechanical engineer, with an energy audit at the Odesa Polytechnic University. In 2000, he graduated from the Ivano-Frankivsk Technical University.

From September 2000 to May 2001, he was an installer of the 4th category of the Universal collective enterprise. From June to August 2001, he was an installer of the 4th category of the Sigma-C collective enterprise.

From August 2001 to March 2002, he was the operator of the 4th category boiler house. From March 2002 to February 2006, he was the driver of technological compressors of the 4th category of the Tarutyne compressor station of the Odesa line production department of main gas pipelines. »NJSC" Naftogaz "of Ukraine in the city of Tarutyne, Odesa Oblast.

From 2005 to 2006, he worked as an engineer of electrochemical protection of the Odesa Linear Production Department of Main Gas Pipelines of UMG "Prikarpattransgaz".

From July 2006 to February 2010, he was an engineer of compressor stations and a linear maintenance service of the Odesa Linear Production Department of Main Gas Pipelines, "Prykarpattransgaz" PJSC "Ukrtransgaz" NJSC "Naftogaz" and in Odesa.

From February 2010 to November 2011, he was the Engineer of the 2nd category of the Laboratory of Technical Diagnostics of Ivano-Frankivsk Technical Center of the Research and Production Center of Technical Diagnostics "Techdiagaz" PJSC "Ukrtransgaz" NJSC "Naftogaz" in Ivano-Frankivsk.

In 2011, he has been an engineer in the capital construction department. JSC "Ukrtransgaz", from 2010 to 2011 worked as an engineer of the second category in the Technical Diagnostics Laboratory of the Ivano-Frankivsk Technical Center of the Research and Production Center for Technical Diagnostics.

From November 2011 to June 2014, he was a l Leading Engineer of the Department of Capital Construction, Repairs and ICC of the Department of Planning, Preparation and Financing of Repairs of the Department of Preparation and Support of Repairs of PJSC "Ukrtransgaz" NJSC "Naftogaz" in Kyiv.

In the winter of 2013 to 2014, Boychuck was a member of the Euromaidan, and was a centurion of the 37th hundred of the Maidan Self-Defense during the 2014 Ukrainian revolution.

From June 2014 to April 2015, he had been the Assistant Minister of Energy and Coal Industry of Ukraine (Department of the Minister's Office of the Minister's Office) in Kyiv, and at the same time as the Director of Energy and Coal Industry of Ukraine for the functioning and reform of the oil and gas sector of the Ministry of Energy and Coal Industry of Ukraine.

Since 2014, he has been an assistant to the People's Deputy of the Verkhovna Rada of Ukraine of the VIII convocation, to Andriy Parubiy, as and adviser on Energy Security and Oil and Gas Sector.

From January 2016 to December 2020, he was temporarily out of work. In 2020, he founded the Center for Volunteer Initiatives Foundation.

On December 26, 2020, by decree of the President of Ukraine Volodymyr Zelenskyy, Boychuck was appointed the Governor of Ivano-Frankivsk Oblast. He was replaced by Svitlana Onyschuk on 8 July 2021.
