= Kuzmenkov =

Kuzmenkov (masculine), Kuzmenkova (feminine) is a Russian surname.

- Alexey Kuzmenkov (1941–2011), Soviet-Russian screen and stage actor
- Yuriy Kuzmenkov (born 1971), Russian colonel general

== See also ==
- Artūrs Kuzmenkovs (born 1993), Latvian ice hockey player
- Kuzmenko, a Ukrainian surname
