= Rostyslav Chapiuk =

Ukrainian politician (1937–2026)

Rostyslav Stepanovych Chapiuk (Ukrainian: Ростислав Степанович Чапюк; 22 May 1937 – 7 March 2026) was a Ukrainian politician. He served as a People's Deputy of Ukraine (1994–1998), as a member of the Peasant Party of Ukraine.

== Life and career ==
Chapiuk was born in Rusiv on 22 May 1937. He received the Order of the Badge of Honour (1971) and the Honored Worker of Agriculture of Ukraine (1997). Chapiuk died on 7 March 2026, at the age of 88.
