= Olena Hrechanina =

Ukrainian geneticist (1935–2026)

- Олена Гречаніна
- Born: 29 November 1935; Kharkiv, Ukrainian SSR, Soviet Union
- Died: 16 January 2026 (aged 90); Kyiv, Ukraine
- Education: Kharkiv National Medical University
- Occupation: Geneticist

Olena Yakovlevna Hrechanina (Ukrainian: Олена Яківна Гречаніна; 29 November 1935 – 16 January 2026) was a Ukrainian geneticist. A member of the National Academy of Medical Sciences of Ukraine, she was a recipient of the State Prize of Ukraine in Science and Technology (1997).

Hrechanina died in Kyiv on 16 January 2026, at the age of 90.
