= Andriy Bohdanets =

Ukrainian politician

- Андрій Богданець
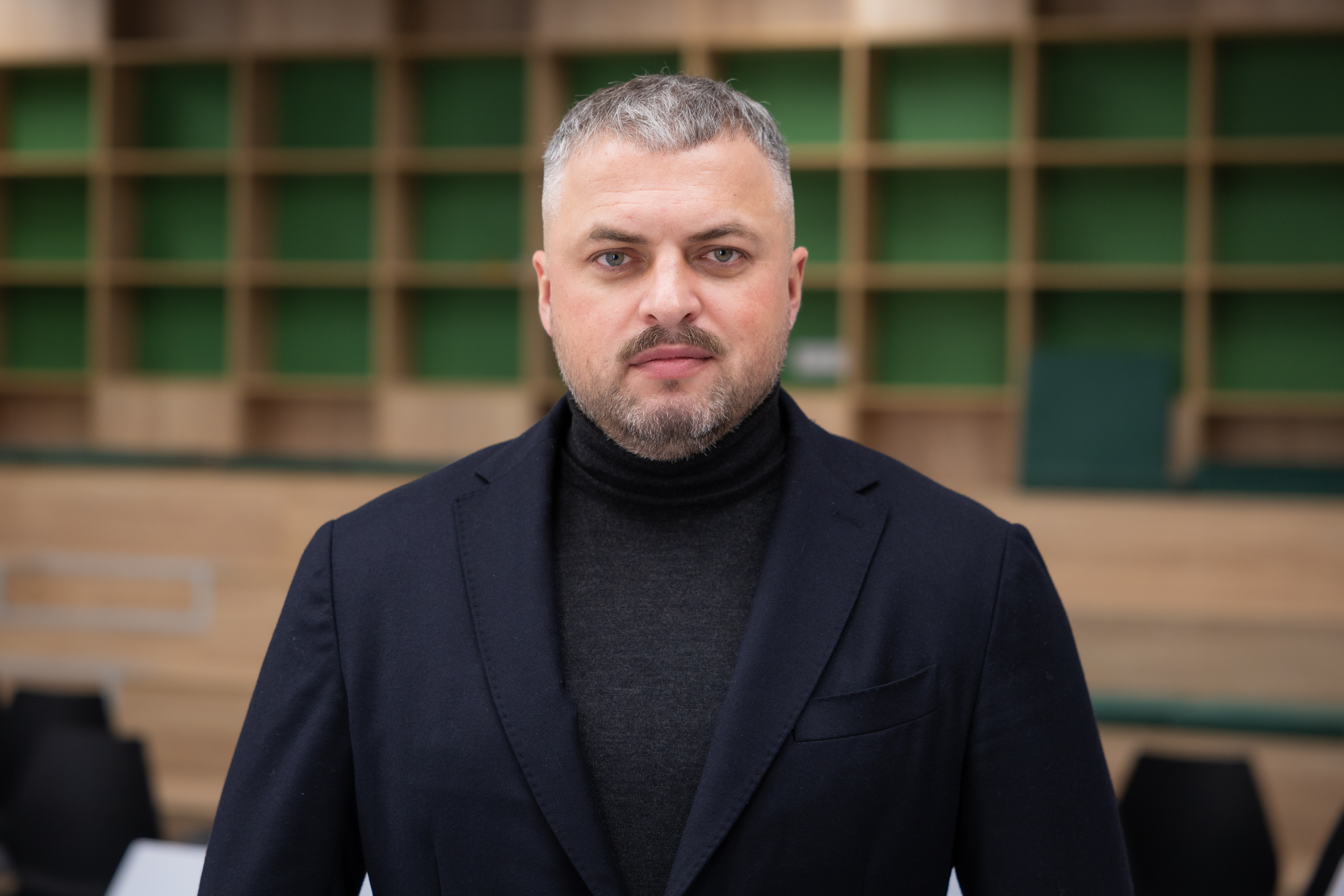
- Image of Andriy Volodymyrovych Bohdanets

People's Deputy of Ukraine
- Incumbent
- Assumed office 29 August 2019
- Preceded by: Taras Pastukh
- Constituency: Ternopil Oblast, No. 163

Personal details
- Born: 13 July 1983 (age 42) Rokytne, Ukrainian SSR, Soviet Union
- Party: Servant of the People
- Other political affiliations: Independent
- Education: Ternopil National Economic University
- Occupation: Businessman; volunteer

Military service
- Allegiance: Ukraine
- Branch/service: Ukrainian Army
- Battles/wars: Russo-Ukrainian War; War in Donbas (2014–2022); Siege of Sloviansk; Battle of Debaltseve

Andriy Volodymyrovych Bohdanets (Ukrainian: Андрій Володимирович Богданець; born 13 July 1983) is a Ukrainian activist and politician currently serving as a People's Deputy of Ukraine in the 9th Ukrainian Verkhovna Rada (Ukraine's parliament). He represents Ukraine's 163rd electoral district, consisting of the city of Ternopil, and is a member of Servant of the People.

== Early life and career ==
Andriy Volodymyrovych Bohdanets was born on 13 July 1983, in the village of Rokytne, in what was then the Soviet Union.

In 2006, he graduated the faculty of computer sciences at Ternopil National Economic University. Since 2014, he is a deputy general director of the Ternopil Poultry Farm joint-stock company.

In 2014, Bohdanets entered Special Tasks Patrol "Sich", which is governed by Ministry of Internal Affairs of Ukraine in Kyiv. He participated in the war in Donbas, fighting at Sloviansk, Debaltseve, Kurakhove, and Pisky.

At the time of elections, Bohdanets was a deputy general director of Ternopil Poultry Farm and politically non-partisan.

== Political career ==
Bohdanets was successfully elected as a People's Deputy of Ukraine from Ukraine's 163rd electoral district as a member of the Servant of the People.

The Head of the Verkhovna Rada Subcommittee on Pricing and Development of Foreign Economic Activity in Agriculture on Agriculture and Land Policy.

- The member of Ukraine's part of Parliamentary Assembly of Ukraine and the Republic of Poland.
- The co-head of interparliamentary tights with the Republic of Iraq.
- The deputy co-head of the interparliamentary tights group with The Federal Republic of Germany.
- The secretary of group of interparliamentary tights with the Arab Republic of Egypt.
- The secretary of group of interparliamentary tights with the Republic of Austria.
