= Ivan Khlanta =

Ukrainian folklorist (1941–2026)

- Іван Хланта
- Khlanta in 2019
- Born: 20 April 1941; Kopashnovo, Khust Raion, Kingdom of Hungary
- Died: 22 September 2026 (aged 85)
- Education: Uzhhorod National University; Institute of Art History, Folklore and Ethnography
- Occupation: Folklorist

Ivan Vasyliovych Khlanta (Ukrainian: Іван Васильович Хланта; 20 April 1941 – 22 September 2026) was a Ukrainian folklorist.

== Life and career ==
Khlanta was born in Kopashnovo, Khust Raion on 20 April 1941. He attended Uzhhorod National University, graduating in 1964. He served in the armed forces, and completed his undergraduate studies at the Institute of Art History, Folklore and Ethnography. In 1976, he defended his PhD thesis "Ukrainian Social and Domestic Fairy Tale". He taught literature and Ukrainian language at School No. 6 in Uzhhorod.

As a folklorist, Khlanta collected and published numerous songs such as Mother's Heart, Fairy Tales and Legends from Under Khust Castl, Scythe Fell on a Stone, Rejuvenating Water, Oskar Kohlberg, Tales of Pokuttya, Truth and Wrong, Clever Woman, How a Man Taught a Cat to Work, Bunny Bell and Gifts of Pears. In 2004, President Leonid Kuchma awarded Khlanta the honorary title of Merited Figure of Arts of Ukraine.

Ivan Khlanta died on 22 September 2026, at the age of 85.
