= Mykola Dzyuba =

Ukrainian politician (1946–2026)

- Микола Дзюба
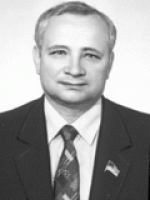
- Dzyuba in 1990

People's Deputy of Ukraine
- In office 15 May 1990 – 10 May 1994
- Preceded by: Position established
- Succeeded by: Vacant (1994); Constituency abolished (1998)
- Constituency: Kyiv, Obolon

Personal details
- Born: Mykola Hryhorovych Dzyuba; 12 November 1946 Suvyd, Kyiv Oblast, Ukrainian SSR, Soviet Union (now Ukraine)
- Died: August 2026 (aged 79)
- Party: Independent
- Other political affiliations: Communist Party of the Soviet Union; Democratic Bloc
- Children: 2

Military service
- Allegiance: Soviet Union
- Branch/service: Soviet Army
- Years of service: 1965–1968

Mykola Hryhorovych Dzyuba (Ukrainian: Микола Григорович Дзюба; 12 November 1946 – 28 August 2026) was a Ukrainian politician who was People's Deputy of Ukraine from 1990 to 1994, representing Obolon, Kyiv.

== Early life and career ==
Mykola Dzyuba was born in Suvyd, Kyiv Oblast on 12 November 1946, to a family of peasants. He was an ethnic Ukrainian.

In 1964, he worked as a fitter-plumber in a military unit 55372 of the Soviet Army.

In 1965, he entered the Soviet Army.

In 1968, he became the driver of ATP 13070, in Kyiv. After leaving the army, he joined the Communist Party of the Soviet Union the same year, where he was part of the Supreme Soviet multiple times.

In 1986, he was a participant in cleanup efforts following the Chernobyl disaster.

In March 1990, Dzyuba was nominated as a candidate for People's Deputies for the elections of the Verkhovna Rada, by the conference of the Minsk District Committee of the Trade Union of Education and Science Workers.

On 18 March, Dzyuba was elected as a People's Deputy of Ukraine for Obolon, Kyiv, through the 2nd round, with 42.53% of the votes. He was one of three candidates, and represented the anti-communist Democratic Bloc. He officially took office on 15 May. He was the head of the subcommittee on issues of development of the service sector, secretary of the Commission of the Verkhovna Rada of Ukraine on issues of social policy and labor.

In March 1994, despite having been nominated by voters, he declined reelection, thus withdrawing his candidacy. In the same year, he had been the referent-consultant of the President of the International Foundation for Humanitarian and Economic Relations of Ukraine with Russia.

== Personal life and death ==
Dzyuba was married and had two children. His death was announced on 28 August 2026. He was 79.
