= Vitaliy Dakhivnyk =

Ukrainian sculptor (1973–2026)

- Віталій Дахівник
- Born: 26 April 1973; Uman, Cherkasy Oblast, Ukrainian SSR, Soviet Union
- Died: 25 July 2026 (aged 53)
- Education: National Academy of Visual Arts and Architecture
- Occupation: Sculptor
- Employer: Zolotonosha Music School
- Organization: National Union of Artists of Ukraine (from 2003)

Vitaliy Borysovych Dakhivnyk (Ukrainian: Віталій Борисович Дахівник 26 April 1973 – 25 July 2026) was a Ukrainian sculptor and art teacher. He was a member of the National Union of Artists of Ukraine from 2003.

== Early life and career ==
Vitaliy Borysovych Dakhivnyk was born in Uman, Cherkasy Oblast, Ukrainian SSR on 26 April 1973. He studied at the National Academy of Visual Arts and Architecture in Kyiv. He graduated from the academy in 2000 and became an art teacher in Zolotonosha Music School.

== Death ==
Dakhivnyk served in the army for the Russo-Ukrainian war. He died on 25 July 2026, at the age of 53, from the injuries he suffered.
