= Viacheslav Bielskyi =

Ukrainian politician (1954–2026)

- Вячеслав Бєльський

People's Deputy of Ukraine
- In office 11 May 1994 – 12 May 1998

Personal details
- Born: 4 May 1954 Sasivka, Kirovohrad Oblast, Ukrainian SSR, Soviet Union
- Died: 10 June 2026 (aged 72)
- Party: KPU
- Education: M. I. Kalinin Crimean Agricultural Institute
- Occupation: Farmer; politician

Viacheslav Ivanovych Bielskyi (Ukrainian: Вячеслав Іванович Бєльський; 4 May 1954 – 10 June 2026) was a Ukrainian politician. A member of the Communist Party, he served in the Verkhovna Rada from 1994 to 1998.

Bielskyi died on 10 June 2026, at the age of 72.
