= Andriy Antonyshchak =

Ukrainian politician (1969–2024)

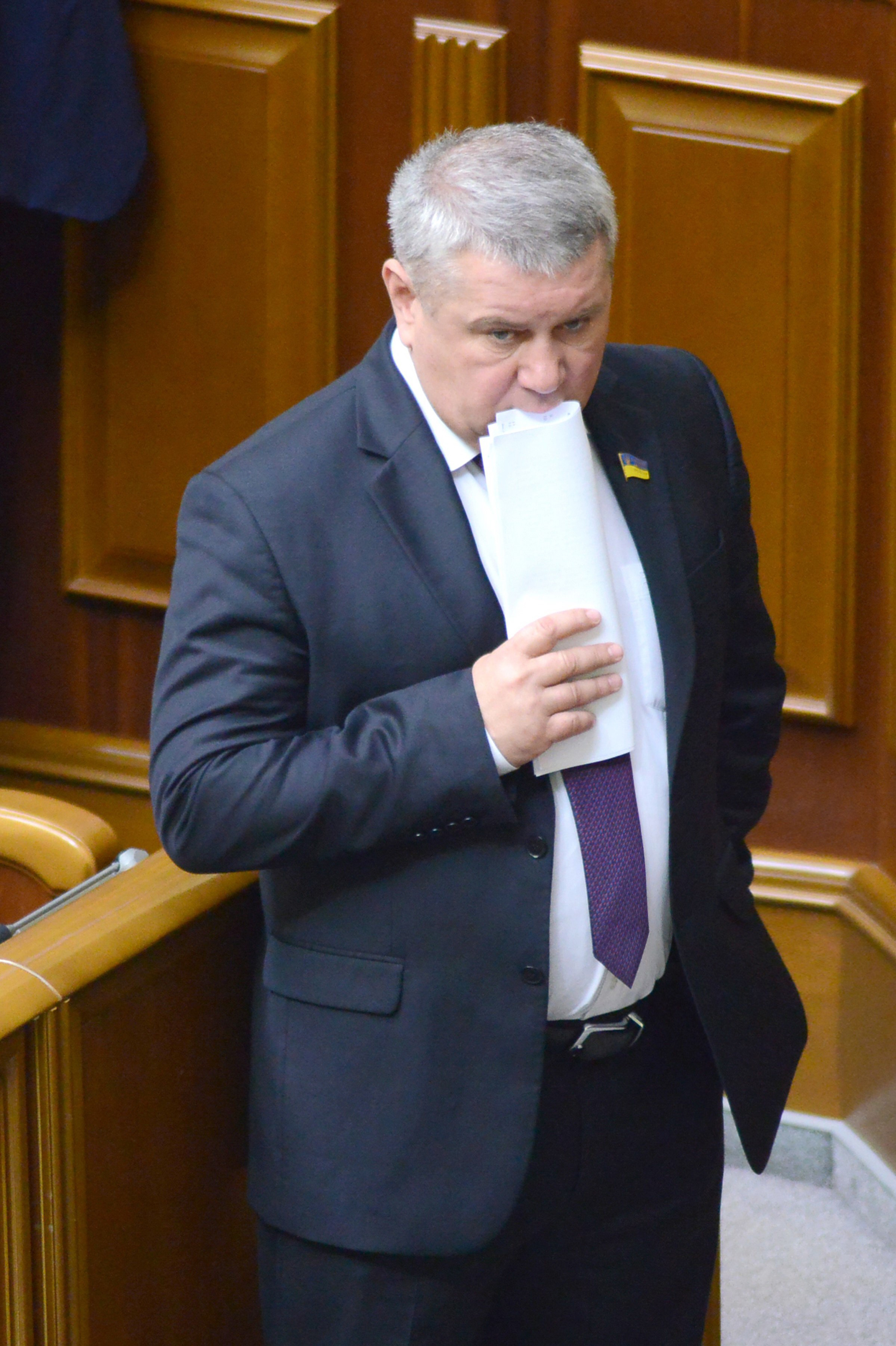
Antonyshchak in 2015

Andriy Fedorovych Antonyshchak (Ukrainian: Андрій Федорович Антонищак; 23 June 1969 – 27 March 2024) was a Ukrainian politician who sat in the Verkhovna Rada for the Petro Poroshenko Bloc from 2014 to 2019.

== Career ==
Antonischak was born on 23 June 1969 in Novyi Rozdil, Lviv Oblast, which was part of the Soviet Union at the time of his birth. He later received a bachelor's degree in personnel and business management from the Interregional Academy of Personnel Management (IAMP), before starting his career in 1991 by working at MP "Rozdil". He continued to work in a variety of companies across Ukraine, including at LLC "N. R. Trade LTD" as the commercial director, at PE "Vladoks" as deputy director, and at PE TV "Galmyasokom" as director of retail trade.

He later began working on social work by heading the public organization "I am a Lviv resident", which attempted to attract jobbs to Lviv, and as coordinator of the campaign "No to banking arbitariness" to criticize the banks' policy towards depositors. He then took on his first political role by becoming deputy head of the territorial department of the "Association of Taxpayers of Ukraine" for Lviv Oblast, and as a member of the Lviv Regional State Administration.

== Military service and death ==
Following the Revolution of Dignity, he volunteered to serve with the 1st Operational Battalion, where they were then deployed to Sloviansk during the Siege of Sloviansk, where Russian-backed militias of the Donetsk People's Republic (DPR) attempted to capture the city, which the group helped repel.

When Russia invaded Ukraine he opted to defend his country at the frontlines. He was part of the 1st Operational Battalion of the National Guard of Ukraine when serving. He was wounded at the front resisting the Russian aggression, his health later gradually declined and he died on 27 March 2024, at the age of 54.

== See also ==
- List of members of the parliament of Ukraine, 2014–2019
