= Vyacheslav Klepikov =

Ukrainian nuclear physicist (1949–2026)

- В'ячеслав Клепіков
- Born: 13 July 1949; Kharkiv, Ukrainian SSR, Soviet Union
- Died: 1 March 2026 (aged 76); Kharkiv, Ukraine
- Education: Kharkiv State University (1972)
- Scientific career
- Fields: Nuclear physics Theoretical physics
- Workplaces: Kharkiv Institute of Physics and Technology

Vyacheslav Fedorovych Klepikov (Ukrainian: В'ячеслав Федорович Клепіков; 13 July 1949 – 1 March 2026) was a Ukrainian nuclear physicist. He was also a professor, doctor of physical and mathematical sciences.

== Education ==
Klepikov graduated from the Kharkiv State University in 1972 in physics and technology.

== Career ==
He worked at the Kharkiv Institute of Physics and Technology, now also known as the National Scientific Center. He was an advisor to the director of Technical Center for Electrophysical Processing and later, the Institute of Electrophysics and Radiation Technologies of the NAS of Ukraine until 2021. Klepikov died on 1 March 2026, at the age of 76.
