= Vissarion Stretovych =

Ukrainian Orthodox Church bishop (1953–2026)

Vissarion in 2012

Vissarion Stretovych (Ukrainian: Віссаріон Стретович, secular name Vasyl Oleksandrovych Stretovych; (Note: In this name that follows East Slavic naming customs, the patronymic is Oleksandrovych and the family name is Stretovych.) (Note: Ukrainian: Василь Олександрович Стретович) 4 December 1953 – 18 September 2026) was a Ukrainian bishop of the Ukrainian Orthodox Church (Moscow Patriarchate). He died on 18 September 2026, at the age of 72.
