= 2026 Kyiv school stabbing =

2026 crime in Kyiv, Ukraine

Coordinates: 50.49881°N 30.50910°E

Kyiv school stabbing
- Location: Kyiv, Ukraine
- Date: 12 January 2026 (Eastern European Time)
- Target: Students and staff
- Attack type: School stabbing
- Weapon: Knife
- Deaths: 0
- Injuries: 3 (including the perpetrator)
- Perpetrator: Nikita Solovyov
- Motive: Under investigation

On 12 January 2026, 14-year-old student Nikita Solovyovat attacked a teacher and a fellow student with a knife during class, injuring both, before harming himself, at a secondary school in the Obolonskyi District of Kyiv, Ukraine.

The teacher sustained serious injuries and was hospitalized, while the injured student received medical treatment for multiple wounds. The attacker reportedly barricaded himself in a restroom following the assault and inflicted self-inflicted injuries before being detained by authorities.

Ukrainian law enforcement opened a criminal investigation into the attack. Officials stated that the suspect had prepared for the assault in advance, and investigators are examining possible external influence, including online communications found on the suspect's phone. No definitive motive has been confirmed as of January 2026.

== Stabbing ==
The attack occurred on 12 January 2026 during a lesson at a secondary school in the Obolonskyi District of Kyiv. According to police, a 14-year-old boy named Nikita Solovyov entered the classroom wearing a mask and helmet and attacked teacher Svitlana Oliynyk and fellow student Mykhaylo Symchuk with a knife.

The teacher sustained serious stab wounds and was hospitalized in critical condition, while the injured student received treatment for multiple non-fatal injuries. Following the assault, the attacker fled the classroom, barricaded himself in a school restroom, and inflicted stab wounds on himself before being detained by law enforcement officers. Emergency medical services transported all three individuals to hospital.

== Perpetrator ==
The perpetrator was identified as Nikita Solovyov (born 2011), a 14-year-old ninth-grade student at the school. Ukrainian authorities stated that he had no prior criminal record. Investigators reported that Nikita appeared to have prepared for the attack in advance, bringing a knife to school and concealing his identity with protective headgear.

His father, Alexander Anatolyevich Solovyov, is a police officer.

Law enforcement officials examined his electronic devices and online communications as part of the investigation. Authorities stated that potential external influence was being considered, though no confirmed motive or organizational involvement had been publicly established as of January 2026. Due to his age, Ukrainian law restricts the disclosure of personal details.

== Trial ==
On 14 January 2026, a Kyiv district court ordered Nikita to be placed in pre-trial detention for 60 days without the possibility of bail. Due to injuries sustained during the incident, he was initially held under medical supervision before potential transfer to a juvenile detention facility.
