= Ivan Spodarenko =

Ukrainian politician and journalist (1931-2009)

Hero of Ukraine Ivan Spodarenko
- Іван Сподаренко

People's Deputy of Ukraine
- In office 31 March 2002 – 25 May 2006
- Constituency: SPU, No. 5
- In office 25 May 2006 – 23 November 2007
- Constituency: SPU, No. 4
- In office 23 November 2007 – 17 December 2009
- Constituency: NUNS, No. 17

Personal details
- Born: Ivan Vasilyevich Spodarenko; 23 January 1931 Stolne (Koriukivka Raion), Ukrainian SSR, Soviet Unionn
- Died: December 17, 2009 (aged 78) Kyiv, Ukraine
- Party: Socialist Party of Ukraine (2002-2007); Our Ukraine – People's Self-Defense Bloc (2007-2009)
- Education: Taras Shevchenko National University of Kyiv

Ivan Vasilyevich Spodarenko (Ukrainian: Іван Васильович Сподаренко; 23 January 1931-17 December 2009) was a Ukrainian politician and journalist who served as a People's Deputy of Ukraine in the Verkhovna Rada representing the 4th, 5th, and 6th convocations from 2002 until his death 2009, mostly with the Socialist Party of Ukraine (SPU).

== Early life ==
Spodarenko was born on 23 January 1931 in the small village of Stolne (Koriukivka Raion), which was then part of the Ukrainian SSR in the Soviet Union. He is ethnically Ukrainian. After graduating from secondary school, he immediately became an instructor at the editorial offices of the newspaper Way of Victory in Berezna, Chernihiv Oblast. After being promoted to literary editor and later secretary, he left in 1950 to work as a senior pioneer at the Synyavska secondary school in Synyavska, Chernihiv Oblast. He also worked in Synyavska for only a year, before moving to Kyiv, became an editor at the Radio-Telegraph Agency of Ukraine (RATAU, now Ukrinform). This was the last job he would work for a year, as he left his career temporarily to attend university, graduating from the Taras Shevchenko National University of Kyiv in 1957 with a specialisation as a journalist.

== Journalism career ==
After graduating in Kyiv, he became a literary staff member at the editorial offices of the newspaper Red Banner, the official newspaper of the city of Chernihiv at the time. Spodarenko worked in Rivne for four years, and then became a correspondent with RATAU covering Volyn Oblast for five years until 1965. He then resettled in Lutsk, working as deputy editor, then editor for Soviet Volyn in the city until 1971. That year, he moved to Poltava and became editor there for the newspaper Zorya Poltava Oblast until 1973. After that year, he became an editor and then chair at the Kyiv-based Silski Visti, where he remained for the rest of his journalism career up until 2002. He only briefly left the newspaper in 1986, which some other newspapers attribute to his publishing materials about the Holodomor, although he came back within the year due to the editorial staff campaigning for him to return. Silski rapidly expanded its audience during its tenure to a peak of 2.7 million subscribers. Under his chairmanship, the newspaper was also known as one of the main backers of Our Ukraine. Due to heavy controversies associated with the newspaper in 2003, Yushchenko led a campaign in the media called "Hands off Silski Visti".

== Political career ==
Spodarenko first entered politics himself in the 2002 Ukrainian parliamentary elections, running for the 4th convocation of the Verkhovna Rada with the Socialist Party of Ukraine (SPU). He was placed No. 5 on the SPU's party list and was ultimately elected. Upon joining the Rada, he immediately joined the SPU faction, and was appointed Chair of the Subcommittee on Interethnic Relations in June 2002. In December 2005, shortly before reelection campaigns started, the SPU publicised its party list, in which Spodarenko was included as No. 4 behind eventual Minister of Education, Stanislav Nikolaenko. Ivan Bokyi, Spodarenko's fellow colleague at Silski, was also included on the party list at No. 7. After the 2006 Ukrainian parliamentary elections, he was re-elected for the 5th convocation. He retained his chairmanship of the Subcommittee on Interethnic Relations and again joined the SPU faction. However, the 5th convocation was ultimately dissolved early, forcing the snap 2007 Ukrainian parliamentary elections.

Unlike his previous elections, he did not run with the SPU. This came after he joined the "anti-crisis coalition" in 2006 and became friends with Yuriy Lutsenko, who had also left the SPU after the SPU allied with the Party of Regions. For the 2007 elections, he ran with the Our Ukraine – People's Self-Defense Bloc, and was put on the party list of the bloc at No. 17. Upon joining the Rada for a third time, he joined the faction of the bloc, and was appointed Secretary of the Committee on Human Rights in December 2007. His term in the 6th convocation ended early in 2009, prior to the convocation's actual end in 2012, because he died in office.

=== Accusations of antisemitism ===
Spodarenko, during his political career, was frequently accused of antisemitism, especially in relation to his leadership of the Silski Visti newspaper. The accusations mainly come from a 2004 article by the newspaper, which asserted that 400,000 Jews had served in the Nazi SS during Operation Barbarossa and the invasion of Ukraine. The paper was later sued over this, and a number of other articles that were claimed to be antisemitic, dating from 2002 to 2004, although the case was closed in 2005. In April 2005, he was also a signatory who called "to stop the criminal activities" of the Jewish community in Ukraine. Upon Spodarenko being awarded the title of Hero of Ukraine, numerous Jewish groups in Ukraine criticised President Viktor Yuschenko and him awarding it.

== Personal life ==
He was married to Valentina Korneevna, who was 77 at the time of his death. They had three children: Vasily, Natalia, and Irina.

== Death ==
Spodarenko's gravestone in Kyiv.

On 17 December 2009, Spodarenko passed away at 78 years old. Doctors suggested it was due to a blood clot, but did not confirm this. Prior to this, he had gone to the hospital due to his heart problems and had long suffered from heart attacks and strokes. A special newspaper issue was also released for his death, which included public condolences from Yulia Tymoshenko, Volodymyr Lytvyn, and Viktor Yushchenko.

It was initially planned that a farewell would be held for Spodarenko at the publishing house "Press of Ukraine", but it was later moved to the club of the Cabinet of Ministers. Nearly all famous politicians attended his farewell, except Kuchma. Lutsenko, with whom he was friends, was the Minister of Internal Affairs at the time, gave his condolences, as did fellow former SPU members Valentyna Semenyuk-Samsonenko and Oleksandr Moroz. His body was then transported to the St. Michael's Golden-Domed Monastery where Bishop Dimitri conducted the funeral services, and then he was finally buried at the Baikove Cemetery at plot No. 33.

== Honours and awards ==
Spodarenko was awarded the following honours:

- Order of the Badge of Honour
- Order of the October Revolution
- Red Banner of Labour
- Certificate of Honour from the Presidium of the Supreme Soviet of the Ukrainian SSR
- Honoured Journalist of Ukraine
- Order of Prince Yaroslav the Wise, 5th class (2005)
- Hero of Ukraine (Order of the State as a civilian, 23 January 2006)
