= Valentyna Yeshchenko =

Ukrainian doctor and politician (1946–2026)

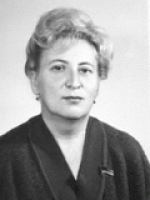
Yeshchenko in 1990

Valentyna Mykolaivna Yeshchenko (Ukrainian: Валентина Миколаївна Єщенко; 10 August 1946 – 3 March 2026) was a Ukrainian political activist who was an Honored Doctor of Ukraine, and chief physician of Novopetrivtsi District Hospital, Vyshhorod Raion, Kyiv Oblast. She was a People's Deputy of Ukraine of the 1st convocation.

== Early life and education ==
Yeshchenko was born on 10 August 1946 to an employee family. From 1961 to 1964, she studied at the Nizhyn medical school in Chernihiv Oblast.

== Career ==
=== In medicine ===
In 1964–1966, Yeshchenko worked as a nurse at Kulykivka District Hospital, Chernihiv Oblast. From 1966 to 1967, she was a nurse in the surgical department of the Sumy City Hospital. Since 1967, Yeshchenko has been a nurse in the 2nd therapeutic department of Kyiv Clinical Hospital No. 22.

In 1967–1974, Yeshchenko studied at the Bogomolets Kyiv State Medical Institute, graduating as a therapist. From 1974 to 1975, she was an intern at the Kyiv Regional Clinical Hospital.

In 1975, Yeshchenko worked as a radiologist at the Dymer district hospital of Kyiv Oblast. From 1975 to 1987, she worked as a radiologist at the Novi Petrivtsi Hospital of Vyshhorod district, Kyiv Oblast. Since 1987, Yeshchenko was the chief physician of Novopetrivtsi District Hospital.

=== In politics ===
On 18 March 1990, Yeshchenko was elected a People's Deputy of Ukraine of the first convocation. She was a member of the "Center" political group. Since October 1992, Yeshchenko has been a secretary of the Commission of the Verkhovna Rada of Ukraine for women's affairs, family protection, motherhood, and childhood.

Since 1994, Yeshchenko worked at the Ukrainian embassy in Belarus. She was a member of the Labor Congress of Ukraine and a member of the All-Ukrainian political association "Women for the Future."

In 2002, Yeshechenko was the director of the Vyshhorod interdistrict executive directorate of the Kyiv regional branch of the Social Insurance Fund.

== Death ==
Yeshchenko died on 3 March 2026, at the age of 79.

== Awards and honors ==
- Honored Doctor of Ukraine
- Order of Princess Olga, 3rd class (2006)
