= Taras Pastukh =

Ukrainian politician

- Тарас Пастух
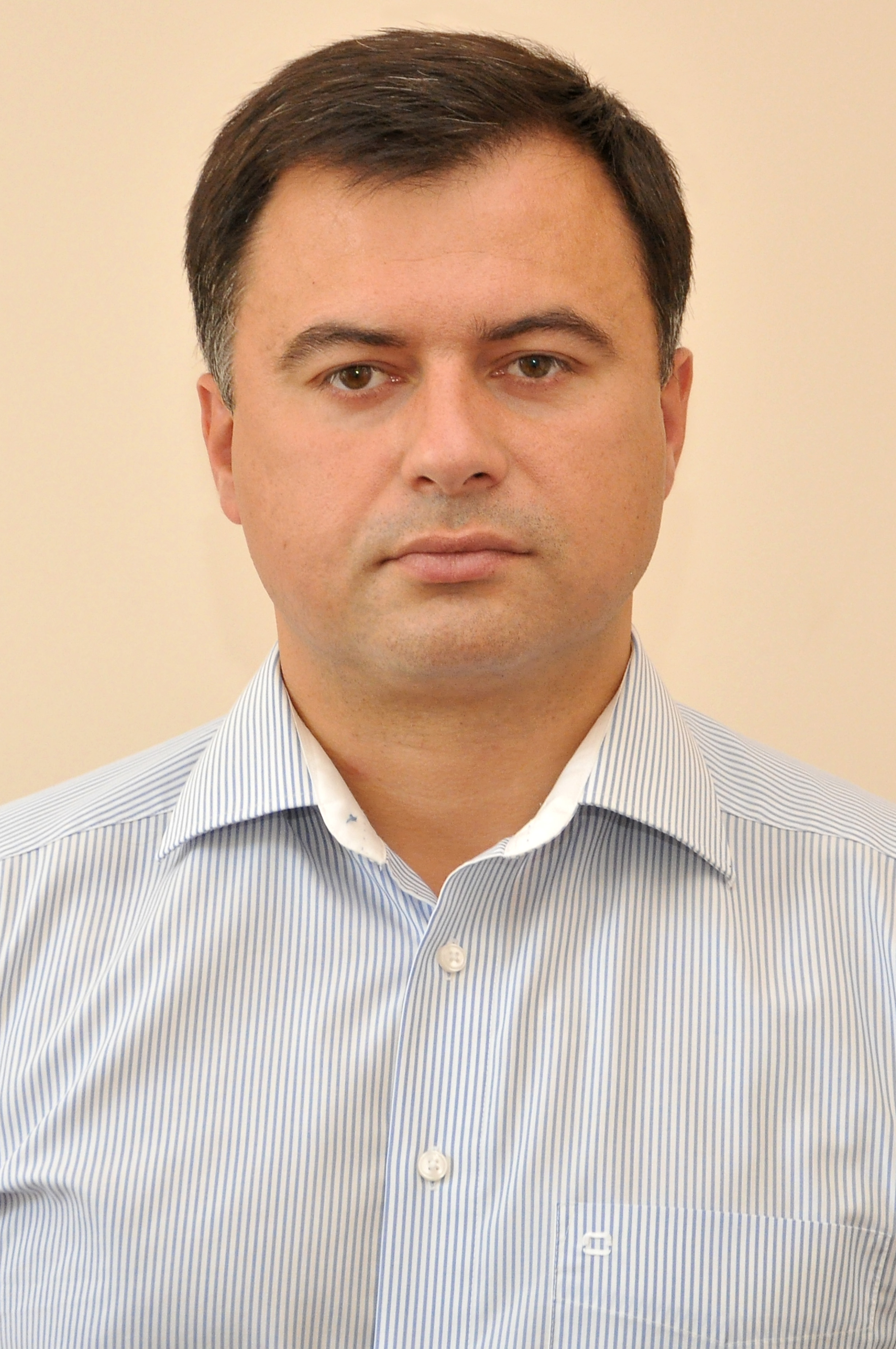

Governor of Ternopil Oblast
- Incumbent
- Assumed office 12 January 2026
- President: Volodymyr Zelenskyy
- Preceded by: Vyacheslav Nehoda

People's Deputy of Ukraine
- In office 27 November 2014 – 29 August 2019
- Preceded by: Oleksii Kaida
- Succeeded by: Andriy Bohdanets
- Constituency: Ternopil Oblast, No. 163

Personal details
- Born: 20 March 1978 (age 48) Ternopil, Ukrainian SSR, Soviet Union (now Ukraine)
- Party: Samopomich Union
- Education: Ternopil National Economic University

Military service
- Allegiance: Ukraine
- Branch/service: Ukrainian Army
- Years of service: 2014
- Unit: 128th Mountain Infantry Brigade
- Battles/wars: Russo-Ukrainian War; War in Donbas (2014–2022)

Taras Tymofiovych Pastukh (Ukrainian: Тарас Тимофійович Пастух; born 20 March 1978 in Ternopil) is a Ukrainian politician and former People's Deputy of Ukraine of the 8th convocation as a member of the Samopomich Union. He was a member of Ternopil Oblast Council in 2006 and 2009, head of the Buchach Raion administration (2008–2010). He served in 128th mountain-infantry brigade of the Armed Forces of Ukraine during the war in Donbas.

In the 2019 Ukrainian parliamentary election, Pastukh failed to win a seat as Samopomich candidate in constituency 163 situated in Ternopil Oblast.

== Biography ==
Taras Pastukh was born in Ternopil. He attended Ternopil General School #15 before enrolling into Ternopil State Technical University in 1996, the faculty of Computer Technologies. Starting 1998, he studied at the faculty of Law of the Ternopil National Economic University, which he graduated with honours. In 2003 he obtained Master's degree in Finance from the same university. In 2008 he became Master of State Administration, graduating from the President of Ukraine's Academy of State Administration.

Taras Pastukh was an assistant to People's Deputy Mykhailo Ratushnyi in 1998–1999.

In 1999–2005, he worked at the Ternopil National Economic University as programming engineer, rector's assistant and lecturer of Criminal Law and Process. Before starting his tenure at the Buchak district state administration, Pastukh worked in the insurance business and as self-employed businessman.

In 2010, he left the Buchach Raion administration after Viktor Yanukovych became the President of Ukraine. In 2011–2014, he worked as CEO at local business enterprises, Opilla and Ninkasi. In July 2014 he voluntarily joined the Armed Forces of Ukraine, joining the reconnaissance company at the 128th mountain-infantry brigade.

Taras Pastukh is a member of the Ukrainian People's Party since 1999, Deputy Head of the Ternopil Oblast party organisation, and member of Central Leadership of the party. Since 2013, he has been Deputy Head of the Ukrainian People's Party. In July of the same year, he became the head of the Oblast organisation of Samopomich Union. Pastukh is married and has four children. Since 1992 he is a member of National Scout Organisation Plast.
