= Volodymyr Komarov =

Ukrainian actor, comedian and musician (1963/1964–2026)

- Володимир Комаров
- Born: 1963 or 1964
- Died: 29 March 2026 (aged 62)
- Occupations: Actor; comedian; musician

Volodymyr Valentynovych Komarov (Ukrainian: Володимир Валентинович Комаров; c. 1963–1964 – 29 March 2026) was a Ukrainian actor, comedian, and musician. He died on 29 March 2026, at the age of 62.
