= Viktor Liashko (politician, born 1935) =

Ukrainian politician (1935–2026)

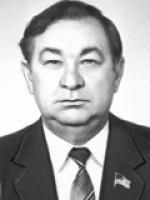
Official Verkhovna Rada portrait, 1990

Viktor Ivanovych Liashko (Ukrainian: Віктор Іванович Ляшко; 26 October 1935 – 21 April 2026) was a Ukrainian politician.

== Life and career ==
Liashko was born in Shchurove on 26 October 1935. He served as an MP from 1990 to 1994.

Liashko died on 21 April 2026, at the age of 90.

== Awards ==
- 2002: Order of Merit, 3rd class
- 2010: Honored Worker of the Service Sector of Ukraine
