= Vyacheslav Nehoda =

- В'ячеслав Негода
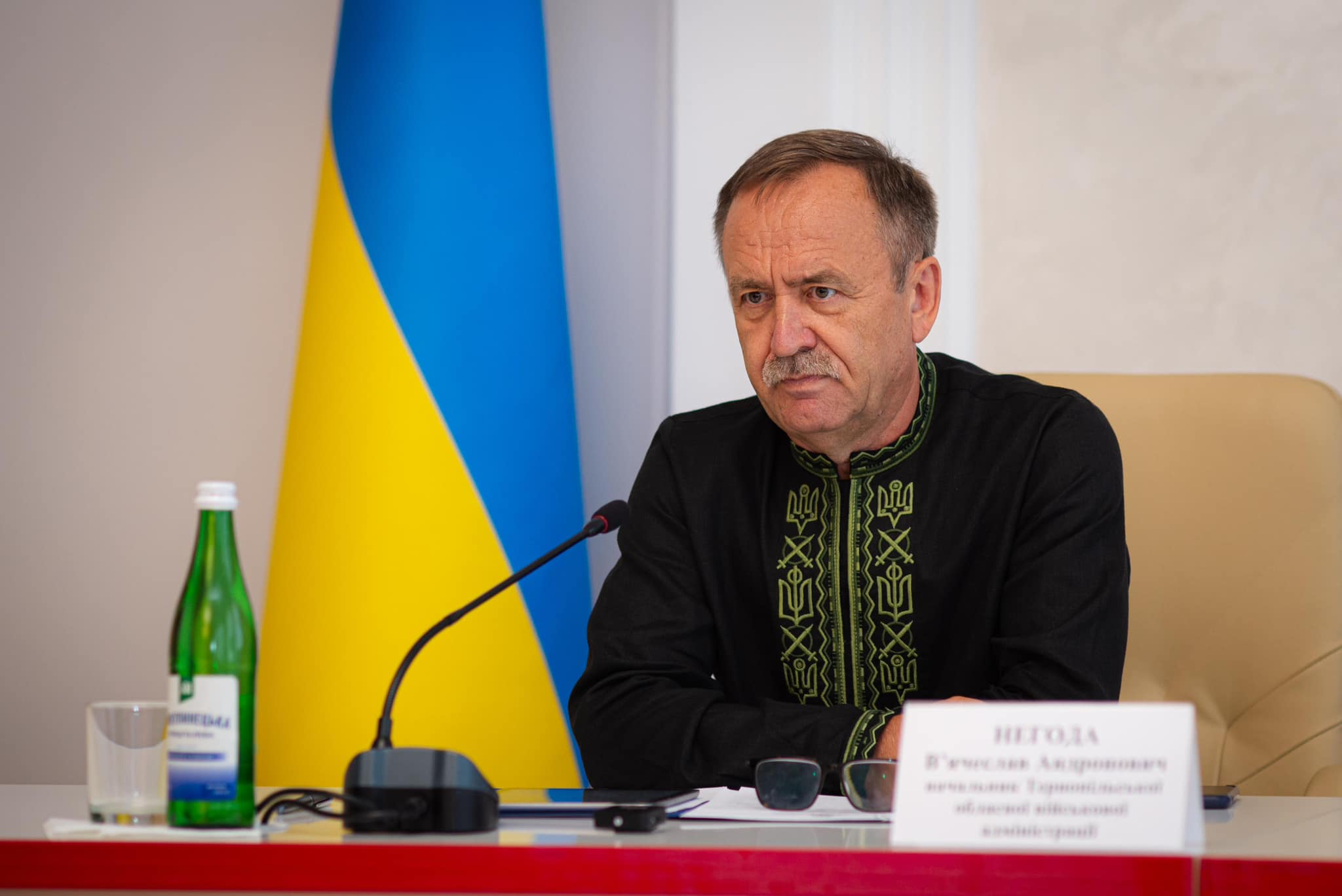

Governor of Ternopil Oblast
- In office 24 August 2024 – 12 January 2026
- President: Volodymyr Zelenskyy
- Preceded by: Volodymyr Vazhynskyy (acting)
- Succeeded by: Taras Pastukh

Deputy Minister of Development of Communities and Territories
- In office 11 September 2019 – 24 January 2023
- President: Volodymyr Zelenskyy

First Deputy Minister of Regional Development, Construction and Housing and Communal Services
- In office 16 September 2015 – 11 September 2019

Deputy Minister of Regional Development, Construction and Housing and Communal Services
- In office 13 October 2014 – 16 September 2015

First Deputy Minister of Regional Development, Construction and Housing and Communal Services
- In office 25 March 2014 – 13 October 2014

Deputy Minister of Regional Development and Construction of Ukraine
- In office 19 March 2008 – 19 April 2020

Mayor of Ternopil
- In office June 1997 – April 1998
- Succeeded by: Anatoliy Kurchenko

Personal details
- Born: Vyacheslav Andronovych Nehoda; 25 May 1957 (age 68) Borschivka, Ukrainian SSR, Soviet Union
- Party: Independent

Vyacheslav Andriyovych Nehoda (Ukrainian: В'ячеслав Андрійович Негода; born on 25 May 1957), is a Ukrainian politician who is currently the Governor of Ternopil Oblast since 24 August 2024.

From 2019 to 2023, he was the Deputy Minister of Development of Communities and Territories of Ukraine.

He also served as the First Deputy Minister of Regional Development, Construction and Housing and Communal Services of Ukraine from 2014 to 2019.

He also served as the 1st Mayor of Ternopil from 1997 to 1998.

He is an independent.

== Biography ==
Vyacheslav Nehoda was born on 25 May 1957.

From 1974 to April 1980, he attended the Kyiv Engineering and Construction Institute, majoring in architecture.

From April 1980 to January 1983, he became an architect, engineer-designer of the engineering and construction department of the All-Union Design and Destruction Institute in Ternopil.

From January 1983 to April 1990, he was the Head of the Vatra Design Bureau in Ternopil.

In April 1990, Nehoda was a member of the Ternopil Oblast Council, member of the regional executive committee.

In 1996, he attended the Ivan Franko National University of Lviv, with a degree in law.

In June 1997, Nehoda was the mayor of Ternopil Mayor. In April 1998, he left office as mayor.

From April 2000 to November 2006, he was the Chairman of the Secretariat of the Union of Leaders of Local and Regional Power of Ukraine, Head of the Secretariat of the Ukrainian Association of Local and Regional Authorities.

From November 2006 to March 2008, he was the Head of the Secretariat of the Verkhovna Rada Committee on State Construction, Regional Policy and Local Self -Government.

On 19 March 2008, Nehoda became the Deputy Minister of Regional Development and Construction of Ukraine.

On 19 April 2010, he was dismissed by Prime Minister Mykola Azarov.

In June 2010, he became the Director of the Department of Regional Policy and Local Self -Government of the Secretariat of the Cabinet of Ministers of Ukraine.

In January 2011, he was First Deputy Director of the Department of Interaction with the Verkhovna Rada and regions, and was the Head of the Department of Expertise and Analysis of Development of Territories and suffrage of the Secretariat of the Cabinet of Ministers of Ukraine.

On 25 March 2014, Nehoda became the First Deputy Minister of Regional Development, Construction and Housing and Communal Services, under Prime Minister Arseniy Yatsenyuk. On 13 October, he was demoted to Deputy Minister of Regional Development, Construction and Housing and Communal Services of Ukraine — Head of Staff.

On 16 September 2015, he was promoted back to First Deputy Minister of Regional Development, Construction and Housing and Communal Services.

On 11 September 2019, Nehoda became the Deputy Minister of Development of Communities and Territories, under Prime Minister Oleksiy Honcharuk.

On 23 January 2023, he resigned from office as deputy minister.

In March 2023, he was the Head of the Office of the Congress of Local and Regional Power of Ukraine under the President of Ukraine on a public basis.

In September 2023, he was an associate professor of the Department of Regional Policy of the Educational and Scientific Institute of Public Administration and State Service of Taras Shevchenko National University of Kyiv.

On 16 August 2024, the Cabinet of Ministers of Ukraine agreed to appoint Nehoda as the Governor of Ternopil Oblast. On 24 August, he was officially appointed by President Volodymyr Zelenskyy. He officially took office two days later. The deputy head of the Presidential Office of Ukraine Oleksiy Kuleba officially presented him to the heads of structural units of the product, heads of RVA, heads of communities, representatives of territorial units of central authorities.
