= Svitlana Onyshchuk =

Ukrainian politician

- Світлана Онищук
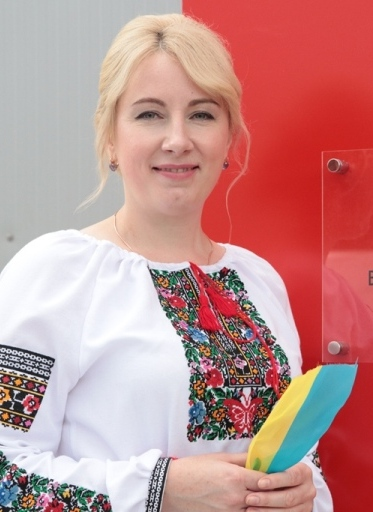
- Onyshchuk in 2021

Governor of Ivano-Frankivsk Oblast
- Incumbent
- Assumed office 8 July 2021
- Preceded by: Andriy Boychuk

Personal details
- Born: 7 January 1984 (age 42) Zabolotiv, Ivano-Frankivsk Oblast, Ukrainian SSR, Soviet Union

Svitlana Vasylivna Onyshchuk (Ukrainian: Світлана Василівна Онищук; born 7 January 1984) is a Ukrainian government official, who is currently the Governor of Ivano-Frankivsk Oblast since 8 July 2021.

== Biography ==
Svitlana Onyshchuk was born in Zabolotiv on 7 January 1984. In 2002, she graduated from Sniatyn Agricultural College with a degree in accounting.

Between October 2002 and September 2006, she was a legal consultant for the private agricultural firm Kobzar in the Ivano-Frankivsk Oblast.

In 2004, she graduated from Vasyl Stefanyk Precarpathian National University with a degree in Economics and Entrepreneurship and is an accountant-economist. In 2005, she graduated from Vasyl Stefanyk Precarpathian National University with a degree in law, lawyer, and a law teacher.

From October 2006 to February 2012, she was a lecturer at the Department of Civil Law and Procedure, a teacher teacher of the department of economic and legal disciplines, and an Associate Professor of Civil Law, Precarpathian Law Institute, Lviv State University of Internal Affairs in Ivano-Frankivsk.

Between January 2012 and September 2014, she was a part-time Associate Professor of Public Administration and Local Government of Ivano-Frankivsk National Technical University of Oil and Gas.

From February to April 2012, he was an adviser to the patronage service of the head of the Kolomyia District State Administration of the Ivano-Frankivsk Region.

In April 2012, she was the Head of the Department of Analytical Support and Public Relations and Mass Media of the Department of Organizational and Personnel of the National Agency of Ukraine for Civil Service in Kyiv.

From April 2012 to May 2015, she was the Head of the Civil Service of the Main Department of Civil Service of Ukraine in Ivano-Frankivsk Oblast.

Between May 2015 and September 2019, she was the Head of the Interregional Department of the National Agency for Civil Service in Chernivtsi, Ivano-Frankivsk and Ternopil regions in Ivano-Frankivsk.

From October 2015 to September 2019, she was a part-time Professor of Public Administration and Administration of Ivano-Frankivsk National Technical University of Oil and Gas.

From 17 September 2019 to 8 July 2021, Onyshchuk was the Deputy Head of the Ivano-Frankivsk Regional State Administration.

On 8 July 2021, Onyshchuk became the Governor of Ivano-Frankivsk Oblast.
