= Orest Salamakha =

Ukrainian politician (1991–2026)

- Орест Саламаха
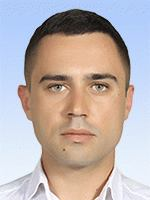
- Official portrait, 2019

People's Deputy of Ukraine
- In office 29 August 2019 – 25 January 2026
- Preceded by: Bohdan Matkivskyi
- Constituency: Lviv Oblast, No. 121

Personal details
- Born: 25 March 1991 Lviv, Ukrainian SSR, Soviet Union
- Died: 25 January 2026 (aged 34) Sokilnyky, Lviv Oblast, Ukraine
- Party: Servant of the People
- Other political affiliations: Independent
- Education: Lviv Polytechnic

Orest Ihorovych Salamakha (Ukrainian: Орест Ігорович Саламаха; 25 March 1991 – 25 January 2026) was a Ukrainian politician serving as a People's Deputy of Ukraine from Ukraine's 121st electoral district. He was a member of Servant of the People.

== Early life ==
Orest Ihorovych Salamakha was born on 25 March 1991 in the city of Lviv, then part of the Soviet Union. In 2013, he graduated from Lviv Polytechnic, specialising in logistics management. In 2018, he graduated from the Lviv University of Business and Law, specialising in jurisprudence.

Prior to his election, Salamakha worked as a manager in wholesale and retail trade, and was supply manager at Bud Invest Kom. He lived in the village of Sokilnyky.

== Political career ==
In the 2019 Ukrainian parliamentary election, Salamakha ran as the candidate of Servant of the People for People's Deputy of Ukraine in Ukraine's 121st electoral district. At the time of his election, he was an independent. Salamakha was ultimately successful, defeating next-closest candidate Mykhailo Zadorozhnyi of European Solidarity with 19.76% of the vote to Zadorozhnyi's 16.25%.

In the Verkhovna Rada (Ukraine's parliament), Salamakha is a member of the Committee of the Verkhovna Rada on issues of budget. In March 2020, Salamakha was one of the People's Deputies to sign a letter opposing a proposal by the Trilateral Contact Group on Ukraine to include representatives of separatist groups from the Donbas in the government in an effort to solve the war in Donbas.

== Death ==
Salamakha died after his quad bike collided with a minibus in Sokilnyky, Lviv Oblast, on 25 January 2026. He was 34.
