= Oleksandr Kabanov =

Ukrainian politician (1973–2026)

- Олександр Кабанов
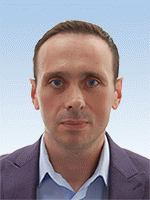
- Kabanov in 2019

People's Deputy of Ukraine
- In office 29 August 2019 – 14 January 2026

Personal details
- Born: Oleksandr Yevheniyovych Kabanov; 6 August 1973 Zaporizhzhia, Ukrainian SSR, Soviet Union
- Died: 14 January 2026 (aged 52)
- Party: Servant of the People
- Education: Zaporizhzhia Medical Institute; Zaporizhzhia National University; Moscow Medical Academy
- Occupation: Screenwriter

Oleksandr Yevheniyovych Kabanov (Ukrainian: Олександр Євгенійович Кабанов; 6 August 1973 – 14 January 2026) was a Ukrainian politician. A member of Servant of the People, he served in the Verkhovna Rada from 2019 to 2026.

Kabanov died on 14 January 2026, at the age of 52.
