= Viktor Kuzmenko =

Ukrainian rescuer (1984–2026)

Viktor Kuzmenko

Viktor Hryhorovych Kuzmenko (Ukrainian: Віктор Григорович Кузьменко; 1984 – 5 May 2026) was a Ukrainian rescuer and civil defense officer.

== Biography ==
From 2025, Kuzmenko had been studying at the Kremenchuk Mykhailo Ostrogradsky National University.

On 27 June 2022, after a Russian missile attack on the Amstor shopping center in Kremenchuk, Kuzmenko took part in the removal of rubble, rescued a fellow rescuer who was fatally trapped by a beam. In September 2024, he rescued a wounded soldier from under the rubble. In February 2025, he took part in the elimination of a fire at the Yablunivka gas processing department, where high-pressure gas pipelines caught fire. After the shelling of a high-rise building on Balenka street in Poltava, he personally saved a woman, while another 17 people were rescued under his leadership. In the village of Kachanove, he led the three-day efforts to put out a fire.

Kuzmenko died on 5 May 2026 following a Russian double tap strike on a gas production facility in Poltava Oblast, at the age of 42.

== Awards ==
- Hero of Ukraine (2025)
