= Ihor Zvarych =

Ukrainian politician (1952–2026)

- Ігор Зварич
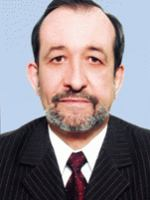
- Zvarych in 2007

People's Deputy of Ukraine
- In office 14 February 2011 – 12 December 2012
- In office 25 May 2006 – 23 November 2007

Personal details
- Born: Ihor Teodorovych Zvarych; 28 October 1952 Verbivchyk, Lviv Oblast, Ukrainian SSR, Soviet Union
- Died: 8 July 2026 (aged 73)
- Party: Party of Regions
- Education: Lviv Polytechnic Institute; Precarpathian University
- Occupation: Academic

Ihor Teodorovych Zvarych (Ukrainian: Ігор Теодорович Зварич; 28 October 1952 – 8 July 2026) was a Ukrainian politician. A member of the Party of Regions, he served in the Verkhovna Rada from 2006 to 2007 and from 2011 to 2012.

Zvarych died on 8 July 2026, at the age of 73.
