= Ivan Rudnytskyi =

Ukrainian footballer

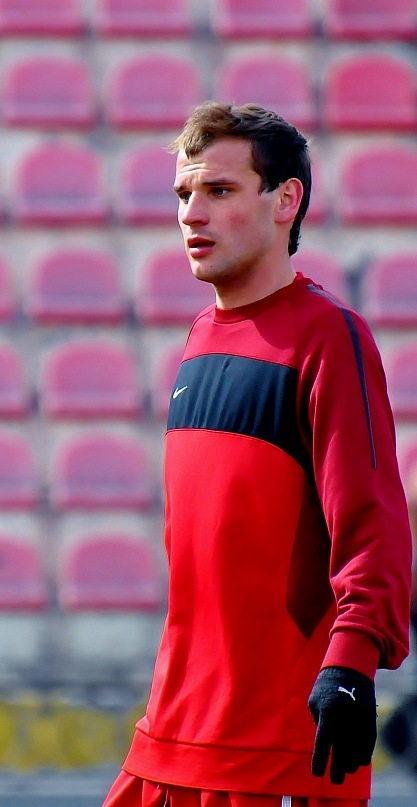

Personal information
- Date of birth: 5 July 1991 (age 35)
- Place of birth: Ternopil, Ukrainian SSR
- Height: 1.81 m (5 ft 11 1/2 in)
- Position: Midfielder

Youth career
- 2004–2008: SDYuShOR Ukraina Luhansk

Senior career*
Years	Team	Apps	(Gls)
2008–2009	Zorya Luhansk	0	(0)
2010–2014	Zirka Kirovohrad	98	(16)
2015	Nyva Ternopil	0	(0)
2016	Neman Grodno	3	(0)
2017	Shukura Kobuleti	3	(0)
2017	Sumy	2	(0)
2017	Erebuni		
2018	Zirka Kropyvnytskyi	12	(2)

International career
2008	Ukraine U19	1	(0)
- * Club domestic league appearances and goals as of 17 February 2019

Ivan Rudnytskyi (Ukrainian: Іван Рудницький; born 5 July 1991) is a Ukrainian former professional footballer.

== Career ==
In 2016, he played for Neman Grodno.
