= 2025 in Ukraine =

- Decades: 2000s; 2010s; 2020s
- See also: History of Ukraine; List of years in Ukraine

Events in the year 2025 in Ukraine.

== Incumbents ==
- President: Volodymyr Zelenskyy
- Prime Minister: Denys Shmyhal (until 16 July); Yulia Svyrydenko (since 17 July)

=== Governors ===
- Cherkasy Oblast: Ihor Taburets (Independent / SN ally)
- Chernihiv Oblast: Vyacheslav Chaus (Independent / SN ally)
- Chernivtsi Oblast: Ruslan Zaparanyuk (Independent / SN ally)
- Dnipropetrovsk Oblast: Serhiy Lysak (Independent / SN ally)
- Donetsk Oblast: Vadym Filashkin (Independent / SN ally)
- Ivano-Frankivsk Oblast: Svitlana Onyshchuk (Independent / SN ally)
- Kharkiv Oblast: Oleh Syniehubov (SN)
- Kherson Oblast: Oleksandr Prokudin (Independent / SN ally)
- Khmelnytskyi Oblast: Serhiy Tyurin (Independent / SN ally)
- Kirovohrad Oblast: Andriy Raikovych (Independent / SN ally)
- Kyiv Oblast: Ruslan Kravchenko (Independent / SN ally)
- Luhansk Oblast: Artem Lysohor (Independent / SN ally)
- Lviv Oblast: Maksym Kozytskyi (SN)
- Mykolaiv Oblast: Vitaliy Kim (SN)
- Odesa Oblast: Oleh Kiper (Independent / SN ally)
- Poltava Oblast: Philip Pronin (Independent / SN ally)
- Rivne Oblast: Oleksandr Koval (Independent / SN ally)
- Sumy Oblast: Volodymyr Artyukh (Independent / SN ally)
- Ternopil Oblast: Vyacheslav Negoda (Independent / SN ally)
- Vinnytsia Oblast: Nataliia Zabolotna (Acting, Independent / SN ally)
- Volyn Oblast: Ivan Rudnytskyi (Independent / SN ally)
- Zakarpattia Oblast: Myroslav Biletskyi (Independent / SN ally)
- Zaporizhzhia Oblast: Ivan Fedorov (SN)
- Zhytomyr Oblast: Vitaliy Bunechko (Independent / SN ally)

== Ongoing ==
- Russo-Ukrainian War (2014–present)
  - Russian invasion of Ukraine (2022–present)

== Events ==
=== January ===
- 1 January –
  - Ukraine halts the transportation of Russian gas supplies through the country, following the expiration of a five-year transit deal.
  - Ukraine becomes a state party in the International Criminal Court.
- 11 January – Ukraine announces the capture of two North Korean soldiers during fighting in Russia's Kursk Oblast.
- 16 January – Ukraine and the United Kingdom sign a 100-year partnership agreement.
- 21 January – Ukraine and Albania sign a 10-year bilateral security agreement.

=== February ===
- 12 February –
  - The head of the Security Service of Ukraine's (SBU) counter-terrorism department is arrested on suspicion of working for Russia since 2018.
  - US president Donald Trump announces the beginning of negotiations with Russia to end the war in Ukraine following a phone call with Russian president Vladimir Putin.
- 13 February – President Zelenskyy imposes sanctions on multiple oligarchs and individuals including former president Petro Poroshenko, Viktor Medvedchuk, Kostyantyn Zhevago, Ihor Kolomoisky and Hennadiy Boholyubov on suspicion of "high treason" and assisting a terrorist organization, particularly their role in compromising national security through unfavorable business agreements with Russia.
- 28 February – A diplomatic row breaks out between President Zelenskyy and US President Donald Trump during their meeting at the White House, resulting in the failure to sign the Ukraine–United States Mineral Resources Agreement.

=== March ===
- 3 March – The United States suspends all military aid to Ukraine.
- 5 March – The United States suspends intelligence sharing with Ukraine.
- 12 March – After talks between US and Ukrainian officials in Saudi Arabia, the United States resumes military aid and intelligence sharing with Ukraine as well as intelligence support.
- 13 March –
  - The European Court of Human Rights rules that the Ukrainian government failed to prevent and adequately investigate the 2014 Odesa clashes and orders it to pay compensation.
  - The former leader of the Right Sector's Odesa branch, Demyan Hanul, is shot dead in Odesa.
- 16 March – The Ukrainian military confirms its withdrawal from Sudzha, Kursk Oblast.
- 17 March – President Zelenskyy signs a law allowing the Armed Forces of Ukraine to operate overseas in times of martial law.
- 28 March – Oleksandr Plakhotnik, the former deputy mayor of Kamianske, Dnipropetrovsk Oblast is found shot dead in the city.

=== April ===
- 28 April – Former president Viktor Yanukovych is convicted and sentenced to 15 years' imprisonment in absentia by a Ukrainian court on charges of inciting the desertion of Ukrainian officials and organizing illegal border crossings to Russia during his escape in 2014.
- 30 April – Ukraine signs the mineral resources agreement with the United States.

=== May ===
- 1 May – The Supreme Court of Ukraine rules against religious exemptions from military service during wartime following a case involving a member of the Jehovah's Witnesses who refused to undergo mobilization.
- 8 May – The Verkhovna Rada ratifies the mineral resources agreement with the United States.
- 9 May – The Security Service of Ukraine announces the discovery and dismantling of a spy network operated by Hungarian intelligence in Zakarpattia Oblast, resulting in two arrests.
- 12 May – The International Civil Aviation Organization finds Russia responsible for the downing of Malaysia Airlines Flight 17 over Donetsk Oblast in 2014.
- 16 May – Ukraine and Russia hold their first direct peace negotiations since 2022 in Turkey.
- 17 May – Ukraine's Ziferblat finishes in ninth place at Eurovision 2025 in Switzerland with the single "Bird of Pray".
- 23–25 May – Russia and Ukraine conduct the largest prisoner exchange during the Russo-Ukrainian war that had been agreed upon during the 16 May peace negotiations in Istanbul, resulting in the release of more than 1,000 prisoners on each side.

=== June ===
- 10 June – The Desniansky District Court in Kyiv becomes the first court in Ukraine to recognize a same-sex couple as a family under Ukrainian law after it rules that the relationship between Zoryan Kis, first secretary of the Ukrainian Embassy in Israel, and his partner Tymur Levchuk, constituted a de facto marriage following their wedding in the United States and a case brought against the Ministry of Foreign Affairs over its refusal to recognize the couple's spousal rights.
- 29 June – President Zelenskyy signs a decree withdrawing Ukraine from the Ottawa Treaty on Landmines.

=== July ===
- 9 July –
  - The SBU arrests two Chinese nationals in Kyiv on suspicion of gathering intelligence on the Neptune missile system.
  - The European Court of Human Rights finds Russia responsible for the downing of Malaysia Airlines Flight 17 over eastern Ukraine in 2014.
- 10 July – An SBU colonel is shot dead by an unidentified gunman in Holosiivskyi District, Kyiv. Two suspected Russian FSB agents accused of carrying out the killing are in turn killed in an SBU raid on a safehouse in Kyiv Oblast on 13 July.
- 14 July – President Zelenskyy announces a government reshuffle and nominates Yulia Svyrydenko as prime minister. Following the announcement, outgoing prime minister Denys Shmyhal submits his resignation the next day, which the Verkhovna Rada accepts on 16 July.
- 16 July – A cadet opens fire on fellow soldiers at a Ukrainian Ground Forces training ground in Chernihiv Oblast, killing two instructors before being arrested.
- 17 July –
  - The Verkhovna Rada confirms Yulia Svyrydenko as prime minister.
  - Hungary imposes an entry ban on Ukrainian military officials amid a diplomatic dispute caused by the death of a dual Hungarian-Ukrainian citizen who died in disputed circumstances following his mobilization into the Ukrainian military.
- 22 July –
  - Protests break out nationwide after President Zelenskyy signs a bill allowing general control of the National Anti-Corruption Bureau (NABU) and the Specialized Anti-Corruption Prosecutor's Office (SAP), in the biggest anti-government protest in Ukraine since the start of the Russian invasion.
  - The suspected administrator of the cybercrime platform xss.is is arrested in Kyiv.
  - A Dassault Mirage 2000 fighter jet of the Ukrainian Air Force crashes in Volyn Oblast. The pilot ejects safely and is rescued.
- 31 July – President Zelenskyy signs a law reinstating the independence of the NABU and SAPO amid threats of a suspension of financial support from the European Union and the G7 if these agencies were subdued.

=== August ===
- 4 August – MP Oleksiy Kuznyetsov and former Luhansk Oblast governor Serhii Haidai are arrested on charges related to a corruption scandal involving inflated state contracts for drones and electronic warfare equipment from 2024 to 2025.
- 7 August – A gunman is arrested after injuring himself in a shooting at a McDonald's in Cherkasy.
- 15 August – The telecommunications firm Kyivstar is listed on NASDAQ, becoming the first Ukrainian company to be listed on an American stock exchange.
- 21 August – A Ukrainian national is arrested in Italy on suspicion of co-masterminding the Nord Stream pipelines sabotage in 2022.
- 26 August –
  - The Ukrainian military officially acknowledges the entry of Russian forces into Dnipropetrovsk Oblast.
  - The government revises its travel regulations to allow men aged between 18 and 22 years old to leave Ukraine for the first time since the Russian invasion.
- 30 August – Incumbent MP and former Verkhovna Rada chair Andriy Parubiy is shot dead in Lviv.

=== September ===
- 7 September – The headquarters of the Cabinet of Ministers in Kyiv is set on fire following a Russian strike.
- 12 September – Britain's Prince Harry makes a surprise visit to Kyiv and visits wounded Ukrainian soldiers at the National Museum of the History of Ukraine.
- 17 September – The Verkhovna Rada ratifies a 100-year partnership agreement with the United Kingdom.
- 24 September – Ukraine and Syria formally reestablish diplomatic relations that had been severed following the decision of President Bashar al-Assad's regime to recognize the independence of the Donetsk and Luhansk People's Republics in June 2022.

=== October ===
- 1 October – Nine people are killed in flooding caused by a rainstorm in Odesa.
- 2 October – Ukraine severs diplomatic relations with Nicaragua in response to the latter's recognition of the Russian annexation of Donetsk, Kherson, Luhansk and Zaporizhzhia oblasts and Crimea.
- 14 October – President Zelenskyy issues a decree stripping the Ukrainian citizenship of Odesa mayor Hennadiy Trukhanov amid allegations that he possessed Russian citizenship, effectively removing him from office.
- 16 October – President Zelenskyy appoints Olha Reshetylova to become the first military ombudsman of Ukraine.
- 24 October – A bombing at a railway station in Ovruch kills four people, including the perpetrator, and injures 12 others.
- 27 October – A floating crane capsizes at the Sevastopol Shipyard, killing two people.

=== November ===
- 6 November – A captured Russian soldier is sentenced by a Ukrainian court to life imprisonment for fatally shooting a surrendering Ukrainian soldier in Zaporizhzhia Oblast in 2024.
- 12 November – German Galushchenko is suspended as justice minister amid a corruption investigation involving the state nuclear energy firm Energoatom. He resigns along with energy minister Svitlana Hrynchuk later that day.
- 18 November – Former deputy prime minister Oleksiy Chernyshov is arrested on charges relating to the Energoatom scandal.
- 23 November – Danylo Yavhusishyn, also known as Aonishiki Arata, becomes the first Ukrainian to win a professional sumo tournament, defeating Mongolia's Hōshōryū Tomokatsu in Fukuoka, Japan.
- 28 November – Andriy Yermak resigns as President Zelenskyy's chief of staff following a raid on his apartment by NABU over his alleged involvement in the Energoatom scandal.

=== December ===
- 19 December – The European Union agrees to a 90 billion euros ($105.5 billion) interest-free loan for Ukraine that would support its financial requirements during 2026-27.
- 23 December – Russian-installed authorities in Crimea declare a blockage of mobile internet access in the region that would last until the end of the Russo-Ukrainian war.
- 31 December – Russian attacks across Ukraine killed at least 2 civilians and injured at least 16 others.

== Holidays ==
- 1 January – New Year's Day
- 8 March – International Women's Day
- 10 March – International Women's Day
- 20 April – Easter Sunday
- 21 April – Easter Monday
- 1 May – Labour Day
- 8 May – Day of Remembrance and Victory over Nazism in World War II 1939 – 1945
- 8 June – Whitsun
- 9 June – Whit Monday
- 28 June – Constitution Day
- 30 June – Constitution Day Holiday
- 15 July – Statehood Day
- 24 August – Independence Day
- 25 August – Independence Day Holiday
- 1 October – Defenders Day
- 25 December – Christmas Day

== Deaths ==
- 13 March – Demyan Hanul, 31, political activist.
- 20 March – Vitold Fokin, 92, Prime Minister of Ukraine (1990–1992).
- 21 April – Volodymyr Moroz, 57, People's Deputy (since 2019).
- 21 May – Andriy Portnov, 51, presidential aide (Viktor Yanukovych), People's Deputy of Ukraine (2006–2010).
- 28 May – Serhiy Shvets, 48, People's Deputy of Ukraine (since 2019).
- 29 June – Maksym Ustymenko, 32, Ukrainian Air Force pilot.
- 3 July – Manolis Pilavov, 61, pro-Russian separatist, mayor of Luhansk (2014–2023).
- 24 July –
  - Yaroslav Rushchyshyn, 57, People's Deputy (since 2019).
  - Viktor Burakov, 70, Olympic sprinter (1980).
- 6 August – Volodymyr Bilotserkovets, 25, footballer (Zorya Luhansk).
- 27 August – Serhiy Kolisnyk, 60, artist.
- 30 August – Andriy Parubiy, 54, People's Deputy (since 2007), chairman of the Verkhovna Rada (2016–2019).
- 23 September – Pavlo Lapshyn, 37, convicted murderer.
- 14 October – Yuriy Tarnawsky, 91, poet.
- 17 October – Leonid Hrach, 77, People's Deputy (2002–2012) and chairman of the Supreme Council of Crimea (1998–2002).
- 20 October – Mikhail Bakharev, 78, deputy chairman of the Supreme Council of Crimea (2006–2010).
- 21 October – Heorhii Chyzhevskyi, 101, swimmer and World War II veteran.
- 11 November – Hennadiy Balashov, 64, People's Deputy (1998–2002).
- 13 November – Marina Lewycka, 79, writer (A Short History of Tractors in Ukrainian, Two Caravans, We Are All Made of Glue).
- 15 November – Andriy Polunin, 54, footballer (Dnipro, St. Pauli, national team).
- 19 November – Vitalii Drobinskyi, 89, People's Deputy (1990–1994).
- 22 November – Lesyk Sam, 58, singer (Dzidzio).
- 1 December – Volodymyr Muntyan, 79, football player (Dynamo Kiev, Soviet Union national team) and manager (Guinea).
- 4 December – Ivan Makedonskyi, 83, People's Deputy (1990–1992).
- 12 December – Stepan Hiha, 66, composer and singer.
- 15 December – Viktor Kotsemyr, 73, governor of Vinnytsia Oblast (2002–2004), governor of Khmelnytskyi Oblast (2004–2005).
- 23 December – Anatoliy Bondarchuk, 85, hammer thrower, Olympic champion (1972).
