= List of members of the Verkhovna Rada, 1990–1994 =

The first convocation of the Verkhovna Rada, initially called the twelfth convocation of the Supreme Soviet of the Ukrainian Soviet Socialist Republic, was the first legislature of independent Ukraine. The first convocation first met on 15 May 1990 and was dissolved on 10 May 1994. Eleven deputies surrendered their mandate without replacement. Another 25 were replaced during the time of the first convocation.

== Kyiv ==
District (Number)	Deputy	Coalition	Party / Faction	Assumed office	Left office	Lifespan
Artem Street (No. 1)	Larysa Skoryk	Democratic Bloc	Congress of National Democratic Forces	15 May 1990	10 May 1994	Born 4 October 1939 (age 86)
Berezniaky (No. 2)	Pavlo Movchan	Democratic Bloc	Congress of National Democratic Forces	15 May 1990	10 May 1994	Born 13 July 1939 (age 87)
Desnianskyi District (No. 3)	Les Tanyuk	Democratic Bloc	People's Movement of Ukraine	15 May 1990	10 May 1994	7 August 1938 – 18 March 2016 (aged 77)
Gagarin Avenue (No. 4)	Yuriy Zbitnyev	Democratic Bloc	New Ukraine	15 May 1990	10 May 1994	Born 25 October 1963 (age 62)
Holosiivskyi District (No. 5)	Oles Shevchenko	Democratic Bloc	Ukrainian Republican Party	15 May 1990	10 May 1994	Born 22 February 1940 (age 86)
Darnytskyi District (No. 6)	Vladimir Ivashko	Communist Party of the Soviet Union	Communist Party of Ukraine	15 May 1990	19 July 1990	28 October 1932 – 13 November 1994 (aged 62)
Darnytskyi District (No. 6)	Vitold Fokin	Independent	Communist Party of Ukraine	21 March 1991	10 May 1994	Born 25 October 1932 – 20 March 2025 (aged 92)
Zaliznychnyi District (No. 7)	Boris Dukhov	Communist Party of the Soviet Union	Communist Party of Ukraine	1990	17 December 1991	9 November 1937 – 28 November 2011 (aged 74)
Industrialnyi District (No. 8)	Yuriy Hnatkevych	Democratic Bloc	Independent	15 May 1990	10 May 1994	4 April 1940 – 26 May 2025 (aged 85)
Leninhradskyi District (No. 9)	Valerii Ivasiuk	Democratic Bloc	People's Movement of Ukraine	15 May 1990	10 May 1994	Born 14 September 1958 (age 67)
Livoberezhnyi Masyv (No. 10)	Volodymyr Kryzhanivsky	Democratic Bloc	New Ukraine	15 May 1990	10 May 1994	Born 24 January 1940 (age 86)
Obolon (No. 11)	Mykola Dzyuba	Democratic Bloc	Independent	15 May 1990	10 May 1994	Born 12 November 1946 (age 79)
Pechersk (No. 12)	Yaroslav Kondratiev	Independent	Independent	15 May 1990	10 May 1994	15 July 1948 – 26 April 2005 (aged 56)
Podil (No. 13)	Ivan Salii	Independent	Independent	15 May 1990	18 June 1992	2 November 1943 – 26 September 2020 (aged 76)
Riverside Street (No. 14)	Vitalii Karpenko	Democratic Bloc	Independent	15 May 1990	10 May 1994	Born 3 March 1941 (age 85)
Promyslovyi District (No. 14)	Pavlo Kyslyi	Democratic Bloc	Congress of National Democratic Forces	15 May 1990	10 May 1994	5 March 1933 – 2 December 2019 (aged 86)
Radianskyi District (No. 16)	Oleksandr Kotsiuba	Democratic Bloc	Independent	15 May 1990	10 May 1994	Born 7 November 1939 (age 86)
Sviatoshyn (No. 17)	Ivan Zaiets	Democratic Bloc	People's Movement of Ukraine	15 May 1990	10 May 1994	Born 5 July 1952 (age 74)
Syrets (No. 18)	Serhiy Holovatyi	Democratic Bloc	People's Movement of Ukraine	15 May 1990	10 May 1994	Born 29 May 1954 (age 72)
Troieshchyna (No. 19)	Anatolii Mokrousov	Independent	Independent	15 May 1990	18 June 1992	14 April 1943 – 9 January 2021 (aged 77)
Kharkivskyi Masyv (No. 20)	Volodymyr Shovkoshytnyi	Democratic Bloc	Congress of National Democratic Forces	15 May 1990	10 May 1994	Born 16 July 1956 (age 70)
Central Kyiv (No. 21)	Oleksandr Yemets	Democratic Bloc	New Ukraine	15 May 1990	10 May 1994	1 January 1959 – 28 January 2001 (aged 42)
Red Army Street (No. 22)	Yuriy Kostenko	Democratic Bloc	People's Movement of Ukraine	15 May 1990	10 May 1994	Born 12 June 1951 (age 75)

== Autonomous Republic of Crimea ==
Name	Nationality	Electoral district	District number	Remarks
Vitaliy Pavlichenko	Ukrainian	Simferopol-Zaliznychnyi	No. 240	
Volodymyr Sevastyanov	Russian	Simferopol-Kyivskyi	No. 241	
Volodymyr Terekhov	Russian	Simferopol-Tsentralnyi	No. 242	
Anatoliy Matiyko	Ukrainian	Alushta	No. 243	
Anatoliy Pshenichnikov	Russian	Dzhankoy	No. 244	
Vital Kurashyk	Belarusian	Yevpatoria	No. 245	
Yakiv Apter	Jewish	Kerch	No. 246	left November 18, 1993
Serhiy Kunitsyn		Krasnoperekopsk	No. 247	
Sergei Tsekov		Saky	No. 248	
Vitaliy Reva	Ukrainian	Feodosiya	No. 249	
Mykola Spys	Ukrainian	Yalta	No. 250	
Oleksandr Perepadin	Ukrainian	Bakhchysaray	No. 251	
Mykola Kolisnychenko	Ukrainian	Bilohirsk	No. 252	
Mykola Kuzmenko	Ukrainian	Krasnohvardiysk	No. 253	
Hrihoriy Demidov	Russian	Lenine	No. 254	
Mykola Bahrov	Ukrainian	Nyzhnohirsk	No. 255	
Anatoliy Gavrilov	Russian	Rozdolne	No. 256	
Leonid Kazak	Ukrainian	Simferopol	No. 257	

== Cherkasy Oblast ==
Name	Nationality	Electoral district	District number	Remarks
Mykola Artemenko	Ukrainian	Shpola	429	was replaced by Zayets June 1, 1991
Mykola Bilobotskyi	Ukrainian	Zhashkiv	No. 421	
Kateryna Boyko	Ukrainian	Cherkasy-Prydniprovskyi	No. 416	
Mykola Voyevoda	Ukrainian	Kaniv	No. 418	
Vadym Hetman		Uman	No. 425	
Leontiy Dmytruk	Ukrainian	Cherkasy	No. 426	
Vitaliy Drobinskyi	Ukrainian	Uman city	No. 420	
Yuriy Yelchenko	Ukrainian	Talne	No. 424	
Oleksandr Yemelianov		Sosnivka	No. 417	
Hryhoriy Zahorodniy	Ukrainian	Zvenyhorod	No. 422	
Oleksandr Zayets	Ukrainian	Shpola	No. 429	from 4 January 1992
Volodymyr Kryvolap	Ukrainian	Smila	No. 419	
Ivan Pasichnyk	Ukrainian	Chornobay	No. 428	
Vitaliy Polyakh	Ukrainian	Zolotonosha	No. 423	
Volodymyr Shapoval	Ukrainian	Chyhyryn	No. 427	

== Chernihiv Oblast ==
Name	Nationality	Electoral district	District number	Remarks
German Aseyev	Russian	Nizhyn	440	
Mykhailo Hryshko	Ukrainian	Bakhmach	No. 442	
Anatoliy Dron		Ripky	No. 449	
Viktor Kuyanov	Russian	Mena	No. 445	
Anatoliy Lysenko	Ukrainian	Chernihiv-Novozavodskyi	No. 439	
Vasyl Lisovenko	Ukrainian	Pryluky	No. 448	
Vitaliy Masol	Ukrainian	Chernihiv	No. 450	
Pavlo Mysnyk	Ukrainian	Novhorod-Siverskyi	No. 446	
Volodymyr Portnoy	Ukrainian	Pryluky city	No. 441	
Viktor Prykhodko	Ukrainian	Nosivka	No. 447	
Serhiy Semenets	Ukrainian	Borzna	No. 443	
Leonid Yakovyshyn	Ukrainian	Kozelets	No. 444	
Tetiana Yakheyeva	Ukrainian	Desna	No. 438	

== Chernivtsi Oblast ==
District (Number)	Deputy	Coalition	Party	Assumed office	Left office	Lifespan
Leninskyi District, Chernivtsi (No. 430)	Heorhii Khodorovskyi	Communist Party of the Soviet Union	Independent	1990	1994	Born 28 August 1938 (age 87)
1 May District, Chernivtsi (No. 431)	Ivan Boiko	Communist Party of the Soviet Union	New Ukraine	1990	1994	Born 24 April 1950 (age 76)
Vyzhnytsia (No. 432)	Vasyl Bidenyi	Communist Party of the Soviet Union	Agrarians	1990	1994	Born 2 March 1944 (age 82)
Hlyboka (No. 433)	Volodymyr Stus	Communist Party of the Soviet Union	Independent	1990	1994	Born 21 May 1934 (age 92)
Kelmentsi (No. 434)	Dmytro Babii	Communist Party of the Soviet Union	Agrarians	1990	1994	Born 18 September 1941 (age 84)
Novoselytsia (No. 435)	Yevhen Dmytriiev	Communist Party of the Soviet Union	Agrarians	1990	1994	10 February 1947 – 31 May 2021 (aged 74)
Storozhynets (No. 436)	Viktor Zhuk	Communist Party of the Soviet Union	For Social Justice	1990	1994	Born 1 April 1937 (age 89)
Storozhynets (No. 436)	Viktor Zhuk	Communist Party of the Soviet Union	Agrarians	1990	1994	Born 1 April 1937 (age 89)
Khotyn (No. 437)	Mykola Revenko	Communist Party of the Soviet Union	For Social Justice	1990	1994	Born 6 November 1937 (age 88)
Khotyn (No. 437)	Mykola Revenko	Communist Party of the Soviet Union	Agrarians	1990	1994	Born 6 November 1937 (age 88)

== Dnipropetrovsk Oblast ==
Name	Nationality	Electoral district	District number	Remarks
Volodymyr Badov	Ukrainian	Kryvyi Rih	092	
Mykhailo Bayraka	Ukrainian	Dzerzhynsk	089	
Mykola Balandiuk	Ukrainian	Bahliysk	084	
Okeskandr Barabash	Russian	Zhovti Vody	No. 087	
Viktor Veretennykov	Ukrainian	Dnipropetrovsk-Industrialnyi	No. 079	
Yuriy Holovko		Nikopol	No. 096	
Leonid Dubrov	Ukrainian	Dnipropetrovsk-Dniprovsky	No. 085	
Vasyl Yevtukhov	Ukrainian	Dnipropetrovsk-Tsentralno-Miskyi	No. 094	
Mykola Istratenko	Ukrainian	Dnipropetrovsk-Zavodske	No. 086	
Anatoliy Korzh	Ukrainian	Dnipropetrovsk-Babushkinskyi	No. 076	
Mykola Korobko	Ukrainian	Ternivka	No. 093	
Leonid Kuchma	Ukrainian	Dnipropetrovsk-Krasnohvardiyskyi	No. 081	
Pavlo Lazarenko	Ukrainian	Shyroke	No. 107	left 18 June 1992
Volodymyr Mazur	Ukrainian	Verkhnyodniprovsk	No. 101	left 18 June 1992
Volodymyr Medvedev	Russian	Pershotravensk	No. 099	
Anatoliy Melnyk	Ukrainian	Novomoskovsk city	No. 097	
Vladimir Menshov	Russian	Dnipropetrovsk-Pivdennyi	No. 104	
Volodymyr Nehoda	Ukrainian	Marhanets	No. 095	
Mykola Omelchenko		Novomoskovsk	No. 102	
Volodymyr Pavlov	Russian	Dnipropetrovsk-Vuzivskyi	No. 077	
Serhiy Pravdenko		Dnipropetrovsk-Samarskyi	No. 083	
Kostiantyn Prodan	Ukrainian	Tsarychanka	No. 106	
Valentin Protasov	Russian	Dnipropetrovsk-Leninskyi	No. 074	
Valeriy Pustovoitenko	Ukrainian	Dnipropetrovsk-Zhovtnevyi	No. 078	
Mykola Ryabchenko	Russian	Kryvyi Rih-Dovhyntsivskyi	No. 090	
Mykola Sivtsov	Russian	Solone	No. 105	
Volodymyr Slobodeniuk	Ukrainian	Pavlohrad-Zakhidnodonbaskyi	No. 098	
Volodymyr Smetanin		Dnipropetrovsk-Kirovskyi	No. 080	
Vasyl Sukhyi		Pavlohrad	No. 103	
Leopold Taburianskyi		Petrovskyi	No. 082	
Dmytro Khomych	Ukrainian	Inhulets	No. 091	
Volodymyr Chonokur		Kryvyi Rih-Hornyatskyi	No. 088	
Yevhen Chulakov	Ukrainian	Vasylkivka	No. 100	
Volodymyr Yatsuba	Ukrainian	Dnipropetrovsk-Amur-Nyzhnyodniprovskyi	No. 075	

== Donetsk Oblast ==
Name	Nationality	Electoral district	District number	Remarks
Anatoliy Bandura	Ukrainian	Mariupol-Prymorskyi	No. 138	
Raisa Bohatyriova	Russian	Kramatorsk	No. 127	
Oleksandr Bulianda	Ukrainian	Mariupol-Ordzhonikidzevskyi	No. 137	
Mykola Bureho		Snizhne	No. 142	from 14 December 1992
Vasyl Vasyliev		Krasnoarmiysk city	No. 129	
Stanislav Herasymenko	Ukrainian	Krasnoarmiysk	No. 149	
Leonid Hrebenchenko	Ukrainian	Horlivka-Kalininskyi	No. 118	
Viktor Gusev	Russian	Kirovsk	No. 113	
Hryhoriy Dashyvets	Ukrainian	Slovyansk	No. 152	
Ivan Doroshenko	Ukrainian	Donetsk-Budyonnivskyi	No. 109	
Volodymyr Zhukov		Makiivka-Hirnytskyi	No. 131	
Borys Zadorozhnyi	Ukrainian	Mariupol-Tsentralnyi	No. 139	
Yukhym Zvyahilsky	Jewish	Donetsk-Kyivskyi	No. 112	
Anatoliy Kyselyov	Ukrainian	Snizhne	No. 142	left 18 June 1992
Serhiy Kolesnyk	Ukrainian	Torez	No. 143	
Albert Korneyev	Russian	Donetsk-Voroshylovskyi	No. 110	
Sergei Loktev	Russian	Horlivka-Tsentralnyi	No. 120	
Viktor Liashko	Ukrainian	Yenakieve	No. 125	
Serhiy Makarenko	Ukrainian	Makiivka-Chervonohvardiyskyi	No. 134	
Anatoliy Martinov	Russian	Ambrosiivka	No. 147	from 14 December 1992
Ivan Marchenko	Ukrainian	Donetsk-Artemivskyi	No. 117	
Hennadiy Masliuk	Ukrainian	Donetsk-Petrovskyi	No. 115	
Valentyn Mayakin	Ukrainian	Kostiantynivka	No. 126	
Volodymyr Novikov	Ukrainian	Slovyansk city	No. 141	
Zinoviy Ostrovskyi	Ukrainian	Yasynuvata	No. 146	
Oleh Panasovskiy	Russian	Debaltseve	No. 121	
Viktor Paul	German	Khartsyzk	No. 144	
Mykola Piven	Ukrainian	Makiivka-Radianskyi	No. 132	
Mikhail Podiablonskiy	Russian	Mariupol-Illichivskyi	No. 136	
Oleksandr Rybin	Ukrainian	Novoazovsk	No. 151	from 7 February 1991
Valeriy Rodygin	Russian	Amvrosiyivka	No. 147	left 18 June 1992
Yuriy Serebriannikov	Russian	Donetsk-Kalininskyi	No. 111	
Mykola Sydorenko	Ukrainian	Novoazovsk	No. 151	left 16 October 1990
Lidia Sivkova	Russian	Dobropillia	No. 123	
Vladimir Slednev	Russian	Donetsk-Leninskyi	No. 108	
Yuriy Smyrnov	Russian	Krasnyi Lyman	No. 130	left 18 June 1992
Oleksandr Spaskyi	Ukrainian	Maryinka	No. 150	
Oleksandr Starichenko	Ukrainian	Druzhkivka	No. 124	
Anatoliy Tolstoukhov	Russian	Volnovakha	No. 148	
Valeriy Topalov	Ukrainian	Dzerzhynsk	No. 122	
Valentyn Tryzna	Ukrainian	Donetsk-Kuibyshevskyi	No. 114	
Yuriy Khotlubey	Greek-Urum	Mariupol-Zhovtnevyi	No. 135	
Anatoliy Khunov	Adygae	Krasnyi Lyman	No. 130	from 14 December 1992
Oleksandr Charodeyev		Donetsk-Proletarskyi	No. 116	
Vitaliy Chernenko	Ukrainian	Horlivka-Mykytivskyi	No. 119	
Valeriy Churakov	Ukrainian	Shakhtarsk	No. 145	
Viktor Shevchenko	Ukrainian	Makiivka-Tsentralnyi	No. 133	
Oleksiy Shekhovtsov		Novokramatorskyi	No. 128	
Vladimir Yasinskiy	Russian	Selydove	No. 140	

== Ivano-Frankivsk Oblast ==
District (Number)	Deputy	Coalition	Party	Assumed office	Left office	Lifespan
Zaliznychnyi District, Ivano-Frankivsk (No. 196)	Levko Lukianenko	Democratic Bloc	Ukrainian Republican Party	1990	1992	24 August 1928 – 7 July 2018 (aged 89)
Zaliznychnyi District, Ivano-Frankivsk (No. 196)	Vasyl Kostytskyi	Democratic Bloc	Christian-Democratic Party	1993	1994	20 June 1956 (age 70)
Tsentralnyi District, Ivano-Frankivsk (No. 197)	Markiian Chuchuk	Democratic Bloc	Congress of National-Democratic Forces	1990	1994	11 March 1961 (age 65)
Kalush (No. 198)	Mykhailo Holubets	Democratic Bloc	Congress of National-Democratic Forces	1990	1994	30 October 1930 – 14 August 2016 (aged 85)
Kolomyia (No. 199)	Stepan Pushyk	Democratic Bloc	Independent	1990	1994	26 January 1944 – 14 August 2018 (aged 74)
Dolyna (No. 200)	Stepan Volkovetskyi	Democratic Bloc	Congress of National-Democratic Forces	1990	1994	Born 30 January 1947 (age 79)
Kosiv (No. 201)	Volodymyr Shlemko	Democratic Bloc	State Independence of Ukraine	1990	1994	Born 14 January 1955 (age 71)
Nadvirna (No. 202)	Zinovii Duma	Democratic Bloc	Congress of National-Democratic Forces	1990	1994	Born 28 February 1956 (age 70)
Rohatyn (No. 203)	Liubomyr Pyrih	Democratic Bloc	Congress of National-Democratic Forces	1990	1994	1 March 1931 – 19 October 2021 (aged 90)
Rozhniativ (No. 204)	Yevhen Novytskyi	Democratic Bloc	Congress of National-Democratic Forces	1990	1994	Born 10 July 1932 (age 94)
Sniatyn (No. 205)	Dmytro Zakharuk	Democratic Bloc	Congress of National-Democratic Forces	1990	1994	Born 15 February 1940 (age 86)
Tlumach (No. 207)	Petro Osadchuk	Democratic Bloc	Congress of National-Democratic Forces	1990	1994	2 December 1937 – 8 October 2014 (aged 76)

== Kharkiv Oblast ==
Name	Nationality	Electoral district	District number	Remarks
Henrikh Altunian	Armenian	Kharkiv-Kyivskyi	370	
Oleksandr Bandurka	Ukrainian	Derhachi	No. 388	
Stefan Batsiushka	Belarusian	Kharkiv-Ordzhonikidzevskyi	No. 374	
Viktor Bondarenko	Ukrainian	Kharkiv-Frunzenskyi	No. 377	
Ivan Valenia	Ukrainian	Kharkiv-Komsomolskyi	No. 372	
Yuriy Haisynskyi	Jewish	Kharkiv-Moskovskyi	No. 373	
Mykola Hanzha	Ukrainian	Pervomaiskyi	No. 391	
Oleksandr Holoborodko		Kharkiv-Chervonozavodskyi	No. 378	
Anatoliy Hordiyenko	Ukrainian	Izyum	No. 379	
Vladimir Grinyov	Russian	Kharkiv-Industrialnyi	No. 369	
Volodymyr Danylenko		Valky	No. 385	from 14 December 1992
Vitaliy Kazmiruk		Balakliya	No. 383	left 18 June 1992
Vladlen Karasyk		Bohodukhiv	No. 384	
Borys Kachura	Ukrainian	Chuhuyiv	No. 382	
Oleksiy Koliesnik	Ukrainian	Valky	No. 385	left 18 June 1992
Valentyn Korzhyk	Ukrainian	Vovchansk	No. 386	
Leonid Korniyenko	Ukrainian	Lozova	No. 381	
Yevhen Kushnarov		Saltiv	No. 376	
Hennadiy Levchenko	Ukrainian	Kharkiv-Kominternivskyi	No. 371	
Valeriy Mescheriakov	Russian	Khakriv-Vuzivskyi	No. 366	
Volodymyr Moskovka	Ukrainian	Kharkiv-Leninskyi	No. 365	
Oleksandr Puchko		Lyubotyn	No. 390	
Vasiliy Sanin	Russian	Kharkiv-Zhovtnevyi	No. 368	left 12 October 1991
Volodymyr Strelnykov		Kharkiv	No. 392	
Andrey Sukharukow	Belarusian	Kharkiv-Dzerzhynskyi	No. 367	
Oleksandr Tryzna	Ukrainian	Balakliya	No. 383	from 19 December 1992
Volodymyr Usatenko	Ukrainian	Krasnohrad	No. 389	
Volodymyr Filenko	Ukrainian	Zmiiv	No. 387	
Anatoliy Chepurnyi	Ukrainian	Kupyansk	No. 380	left 12 September 1993
Volodymyr Shcherbyna	Ukrainian	Kharkiv-Radianskyi	No. 375	

== Kherson Oblast ==
Name	Nationality	Electoral district	District number	Remarks
Vyacheslav Bychkov	Russian	Novotroitske	No. 401	
Ivan Boksha	Ukrainian	Skadovsk	No. 402	from 18 May 1993
Anatoliy Kasianenko	Ukrainian	Kherson-Dniprovskyi	No. 393	
Petro Lebedyk	Ukrainian	Nova Kakhovka	No. 396	
Borys Markov	Ukrainian	Kherson-Suvorovskyi	No. 395	
Borys Sharykov	Russian	Velikolepetyskyi	No. 398	
Volodymyr Petin	Russian	Henichesk	No. 400	
Pavlo Pulinets	Ukrainian	Bilozerka	No. 397	
Yuriy Umanets	Ukrainian	Kherson-Komsomolskyi	No. 394	
Anatoliy Yurchenko		Skadovsk	No. 402	left 18 June 1992

== Khmelnytskyi Oblast ==
Name	Nationality	Electoral district	District number	Remarks
Hanna Arkhipova	Ukrainian	Slavuta	406	
Volodymyr Bortnyk	Ukrainian	Izyaslav	No. 411	
Anatoliy Hlukhovskyi	Ukrainian	Dunayivtsi	No. 410	
Mykola Liubenchuk		Chemerivtsi	No. 414	
Taras Nahulko	Ukrainian	Shepetivka	No. 407	
Mykola Naumenko	Russian	Khmelnytskyi-Tsentralnyi	No. 404	
Volodymyr Povoroznyk	Ukrainian	Horodok	No. 409	from 14 December 1992
Anatoliy Poperniak	Ukrainian	Letychiv	No. 412	
Vasyl Romaniuk	Ukrainian	Yarmolyntsi	No. 415	
Vasyl Skalskyi	Ukrainian	Horodok	No. 409	left 18 June 1992
Serhiy Tymchuk		Kamyanets-Podilskyi	No. 405	
Anatoliy Tkachuk		Khmelnytskyi-Zavodskyi	No. 403	
Nykanor Fesun	Ukrainian	Starokostiantyniv	No. 413	
Mykola Yarchuk	Ukrainian	Volochysk	No. 408	

== Kyiv Oblast ==
Name	Nationality	Electoral district	District number	Remarks
Oleksandr Andriyaka	Ukrainian	Irpin	212	
Vasyl Androschuk	Ukrainian	Ivankiv	219	replaced Hurenko November 21, 1993
Halyna Vasylieva		Bila Tserkva city	No. 208	
Stanislav Hurenko	Ukrainian	Ivankiv	No. 219	left 25 January 1993
Volodymyr Eismont		Bila Tserkva	No. 216	left 18 June 1992
Valentyna Yeshchenko	Ukrainian	Vyshhorod	No. 217	
Ivan Kapshtyk	Ukrainian	Brovary	No. 210	left 18 June 1992
Mykola Kovalenko	Ukrainian	Baryshivka	No. 215	
Ivan Kutsay	Ukrainian	Pereyaslav-Khmelnytskyi	No. 213	
Volodymyr Makeyenko		Boryspil	No. 209	
Vasyl Martynchuk	Ukrainian	Fastiv	No. 214	
Vasyl Mykhailiuk	Ukrainian	Vasylkiv	No. 211	
Oleksandr Moroz		Tarashcha	No. 224	
Oleksandr Nechyporenko		Kyievo-Svyatoshynskyi	No. 220	
Ivan Nikolayenko	Ukrainian	Myronivka	No. 222	
Ivan Plyushch		Makariv	No. 221	
Oleksandr Ryabokon	Ukrainian	Volodarka	No. 218	
Vasyl Sinko		Bila Tserkva	No. 216	from 14 December 1992
Volodymyr Khomenko	Ukrainian	Brovary	No. 210	from 4 May 1993
Valentyn Shvets		Obukhiv	No. 223	

== Kirovohrad Oblast ==
District (Number)	Deputy	Coalition	Party	Assumed office	Left office	Lifespan
Leninskyi District, Kirovohrad (No. 225)	Volodymyr Panchenko	Democratic Bloc	Independent	1990	1994	2 September 1954 – 14 October 2019 (aged 65)
Kirovskyi District, Kirovohrad (No. 226)	Viktor Shyshkin	Democratic Bloc	Christian-Democratic Party	1990	1994	Born 14 March 1952 (age 74)
Znamianka (No. 227)	Oleksandr Tarasenko	Communist Party of the Soviet Union	For Social Justice	1990	1994	Born 27 October 1943 (age 82)
Oleksandriia (No. 228)	Feliks Pavlenko	Communist Party of the Soviet Union	Independent	1990	1994	Born 10 November 1940 (age 85)
Svitlovodsk (No. 229)	Volodymyr Yavorivsky	Democratic Bloc	Congress of National Democratic Forces	1990	1994	11 October 1942 – 17 April 2021 (aged 78)
Bobrynets (No. 230)	Vasyl Durdynets	Communist Party of the Soviet Union	Independent	1990	1994	Born 27 September 1937 (age 88)
Haivoron (No. 231)	Volodymyr Ihnatenko	Communist Party of the Soviet Union	Agrarians	1990	1994	Born 16 April 1928 (age 98)
Mala Vyska (No. 232)	Vasyl Kriuchkov	Communist Party of the Soviet Union	Independent	1975	1994	Born 16 April 1928 (age 98)
Novoarkhanhelsk (No. 233)	Volodymyr Zheliba	Communist Party of the Soviet Union	Agrarians	1980	1994	16 April 1928 – 21 October 2013 (aged 85)
Novoukrainka (No. 234)	Ivan Musiienko	Communist Party of the Soviet Union	Agrarians	1990	1994	Born 13 February 1943 (age 83)
Oleksandriia Raion (No. 235)	Yevhen Marmazov	Communist Party of the Soviet Union	For Social Justice	1985	1994	Born 14 June 1938 (age 88)

== Luhansk Oblast ==
Name	Nationality	Electoral district	District number	Remarks
Lev Bazilianskiy	Russian	Rovenky	061	
Viktor Bondarenko	Ukrainian	Antratsyt	No. 066	
Oleksandr Borzykh	Ukrainian	Luhansk-Kamianobridskyi	No. 053	
Mykola Havrylenko	Ukrainian	Sverdlovsk	No. 063	
Volodymyr Holovach		Pervomaisk	No. 060	
Eduard Didorenko	Ukrainian	Luhansk-Leninskyi	No. 049	
Volodymyr Dorofeyev		Alchevsk	No. 056	
Yuliy Ioffe	Jewish	Brianka	No. 055	
Vladimir Kvasov	Russian	Luhansk-Vatutinskyi	No. 051	
Vasyl Kozarenko	Ukrainian	Antratsyt	No. 054	
Bohdan Lishchyna		Severodonetsk	No. 064	
Vyacheslav Lobach	Ukrainian	Lysychansk	No. 059	
Ivan Liakhov		Bilovodsk	No. 067	
Oleksandr Ostapenko	Ukrainian	Krasnodon	No. 057	
Mykola Popov	Russian	Starobilsk	No. 073	
Vitaliy Salnichenko	Russian	Rubizhne	No. 062	
Oleksandr Steshenko	Ukrainian	Svatove	No. 071	from 25 January 1993
Viktor Terianyk	Ukrainian	Krasnyi Luch	No. 058	
Viktor Tikhonov	Russian	Luhansk-Zhovtnevyi	No. 052	
Hennadiy Fomenko	Ukrainian	Stakhanov	No. 065	
Eduard Khananov	Uzbek	Svatove	No. 071	left 18 June 1992
Mykola Tsert	Ukrainian	Perevalsk	No. 069	
Mykola Shvedenko	Ukrainian	Stanytsia Luhanska	No. 072	
Mykola Shulha		Lutuhine	No. 068	
Anatoliy Yagoferov	Russian	Artemivsk	No. 050	
Mykola Yaryshev	Ukrainian	Popasna	No. 070	

== Lviv Oblast ==
District (Number)	Deputy	Coalition	Party	Assumed office	Left office	Lifespan
Halytskyi District, Lviv (No. 258)	Orest-Stepan Vlokh	Democratic Bloc	Congress of National-Democratic Forces	1990	1994	2 July 1934 – 4 May 2009 (aged 74)
Artemivskyi District, Lviv (No. 259)	Ivan Drach	Democratic Bloc	People's Movement of Ukraine	1990	1994	17 October 1936 – 19 June 2018 (aged 81)
Zaliznychnyi District, Lviv (No. 260)	Mykhailo Horyn	Democratic Bloc	Congress of National-Democratic Forces	1990	1994	17 June 1930 – 13 January 2013 (aged 82)
Industrialnyi District, Lviv (No. 261)	Stepan Khmara	Democratic Bloc	Ukrainian Conservative Republican Party	1990	1994	12 October 1937 – 21 February 2024 (aged 86)
Radianskyi District, Lviv (No. 262)	Bohdan Kotyk	Communist Party of the Soviet Union	Communist Party of Ukraine	1990	1991	6 November 1936 – 14 August 1991 (aged 54)
Radianskyi District, Lviv (No. 262)	Viktor Pynzenyk	Independent	Independent	1992	1994	Born 15 April 1954 (age 72)
Lychakivskyi District, Lviv (No. 263)	Ihor Yukhnovskyi	Democratic Bloc	Independent	1990	1994	1 September 1925 – 26 March 2024 (aged 98)
Shevchenkivskyi District, Lviv (No. 264)	Viacheslav Chornovil	Democratic Bloc	People's Movement of Ukraine	1990	1994	24 December 1937 – 25 March 1999 (aged 61)
Drohobych (No. 265)	Roman Ivanychuk	Democratic Bloc	Congress of National-Democratic Forces	1990	1994	27 May 1929 – 17 September 2016 (aged 87)
Sambir (No. 266)	Ihor Derkach	Democratic Bloc	Christian-Democratic Party	1990	1994	Born 5 September 1963 (age 62)
Stryi (No. 267)	Vitalii Romaniuk	Democratic Bloc	People's Movement of Ukraine	1990	1994	Born 18 November 1938 (age 87)
Chervonohrad (No. 268)	Bohdan Koziarskyi	Democratic Bloc	People's Movement of Ukraine	1990	1994	Born 16 March 1931 (age 95)
Brody (No. 269)	Dmytro Chobit	Democratic Bloc	People's Movement of Ukraine	1990	1994	Born 19 February 1952 (age 74)
Busk (No. 270)	Mykhailo Batih	Democratic Bloc	Democratic Party of Ukraine	1990	1994	Born 7 September 1955 (age 70)
Drohobych (No. 271)	Yevhen Hryniv	Democratic Bloc	Democratic Party of Ukraine	1990	1994	Born 22 January 1936 (age 90)
Zhydachiv (No. 272)	Bohdan Horyn	Democratic Bloc	Congress of National-Democratic Forces	1990	1994	Born 10 February 1936 (age 90)
Zolochiv (No. 273)	Mykhailo Shvaika	Democratic Bloc	Democratic Party of Ukraine	1990	1994	23 November 1931 – 16 December 2018 (aged 87)
Mykolaiv (No. 274)	Iryna Kalynets	Democratic Bloc	People's Movement of Ukraine	1990	1994	6 December 1940 – 31 July 2012 (aged 71)
Mostyska (No. 275)	Taras Stetskiv	Democratic Bloc	Nova Ukraina	1990	1994	Born 7 April 1964 (age 62)
Zhovkva (No. 276)	Ihor Hryniv	Democratic Bloc	Nova Ukraina	1990	1994	Born 10 March 1961 (age 65)
Pustomyty (No. 277)	Mykhailo Kosiv	Democratic Bloc	People's Movement of Ukraine	1990	1994	Born 28 December 1934 (age 91)
Sokal (No. 278)	Yaroslav Kendzior	Democratic Bloc	People's Movement of Ukraine	1990	1994	Born 12 July 1941 (age 85)
Staryi Sambir (No. 279)	Ivan Makar	Democratic Bloc	Independent	1990	1994	Born 15 January 1957 (age 69)
Turka (No. 280)	Stepan Pavliuk	Democratic Bloc	People's Movement of Ukraine	1990	1994	Born 2 January 1948 (age 78)
Yavoriv (No. 281)	Roman Lubkivskyi	Democratic Bloc	People's Movement of Ukraine	1990	1994	10 August 1941 – 23 October 2015 (aged 74)

== Mykolaiv Oblast ==
Name	Nationality	Electoral district	District number	Remarks
Mikhailo Bashkirov	Russian	Snihurivka	No. 292	
Oleksandr Berdnikov	Russian	Mykolaiv-Korabelnyi	No. 284	from 18 May 1993
Maksym Vynohradskyi	Ukrainian	Mykolaiv-Leninskyi	No. 282	
Ivan Hrytsay	Ukrainian	Mykolaiv	No. 290	
Anatoliy Kinakh	Ukrainian	Mykolaiv-Korabelnyi	No. 284	left 18 June 1992
Volodymyr Matveyev	Russian	Mykolaiv-Tsentralnyi	No. 285	
Oleksandr Moroz	Ukrainian	Mykolaiv-Zavodskyi	No. 283	
Mykhailo Potebenko	Ukrainian	Novyi Buh	No. 291	
Anatoliy Savchenko		Voznesensk	No. 286	
Volodymyr Tolubko	Ukrainian	Pervomaisk	No. 287	
Oleksandr Cheban	Ukrainian	Arbuzynka	No. 288	
Volodymyr Shynkaruk	Ukrainian	Domanivka	No. 289	

== Odesa Oblast ==
Name	Nationality	Electoral district	District number	Remarks
Rouslan Bodelan	Ukrainian	Kiliya	No. 311	from 14 December 1992
Anatoliy Butenko	Ukrainian	Ivanivka	No. 310	
Pavel Galtsev	Russian	Bilhorod-Dnistrovskyi	No. 303	
Mykola Holovenko		Odesa-Kyivskyi	No. 296	
Eduard Horin		Odesa-Leninskyi	No. 293	
Serhiy Dorohuntsov	Ukrainian	Odesa-Suvorovskyi	No. 299	
Vitaliy Dudchenko	Ukrainian	Biliayivka	No. 307	
Oleksandr Duntau	Russian	Izmail	No. 304	
Anatoliy Lobenko		Odesa-Chornomorskyi	No. 302	
Yuliy Mazur	Ukrainian	Illichivsk	No. 295	
Ivan Makedonskyi	Bulgarian	Bolhrad	No. 308	left 18 June 1992
Borys Melnyk	Ukrainian	Tarutyne	No. 314	
Svetlana Ostrouschenko	Russian	Odesa-Prymorskyi	No. 298	
Andriy Pecherov	Ukrainian	Velyka Mykhailivka	No. 309	
Viktor Pylypenko	Ukrainian	Odesa-Morskyi	No. 306	
Ivan Podzharov	Ukrainian	Kiliya	No. 311	left 18 June 1992
Borys Reznik	Jewish	Odesa-Tsentralnyi	No. 301	
Anatoliy Rybalchenko	Ukrainian	Kotovsk	No. 305	
Yuriy Romanov	Russian	Odesa-Zhovtnevyi	No. 294	
Oleh Savelyev	Ukrainian	Savran	No. 313	
Valentyn Symonenko	Ukrainian	Odesa-Malynovskyi	No. 297	left 18 June 1992
Mykola Snigiryov	Russian	Kominternivske	No. 312	
Volodymyr Stadnychenko	Ukrainian	Tatarbunary	No. 315	
Valeriy Khmlniuk	Ukrainian	Tayirove	No. 300	

== Poltava Oblast ==
Name	Nationality	Electoral district	District number	Remarks
Vadym Boiko	Ukrainian	Kremenchuk-Avtozavodskyi	No. 320	left 14 February 1992
Vasyl Bondarenko	Ukrainian	Lokhvytsia	No. 328	from 14 December 1992
Yevgeniy Vasin	Russian	Poltava-Leninskyi	No. 316	
Ivan Hopey	Ukrainian	Karlivka	No. 326	
Mykola Zaludiak	Ukrainian	Kremenchuk-Kryukivskyi	No. 321	left 18 June 1992
Petro Kivshyk	Ukrainian	Hlobyne	No. 325	
Fedir Kiparis	Ukrainian	Poltava-Kyivskyi	No. 317	
Anatoliy Kovinko	Ukrainian	Khorol	No. 331	
Volodymyr Martynenko	Ukrainian	Komsomolsk	No. 319	
Vladyslav Nosov	Russian	Poltava-Oktiabrskyi	No. 318	
Borys Peredriy	Ukrainian	Lokhvytsia	No. 328	left 18 June 1992
Mykola Petrenko	Ukrainian	Hadiach	No. 324	
Viktor Petrov	Ukrainian	Lubny	No. 322	
Leonid Svatkov	Ukrainian	Myrhorod	No. 323	
Viktor Sytnyk		Orzhytsia	No. 329	
Vasyl Stepenko	Ukrainian	Poltava	No. 330	
Mykola Shkarban		Kobeliaky	No. 327	

== Rivne Oblast ==
District (Number)	Deputy	Coalition	Party	Assumed office	Left office	Lifespan
Leninskyi District, Rivne (No. 332)	Vasyl Chervoniy	Democratic Bloc	Independent	1990	1994	24 August 1958 – 4 July 2009 (aged 50)
Leninskyi District, Rivne (No. 332)	Vasyl Chervoniy	Democratic Bloc	Congress of National Democratic Forces	1990	1994	24 August 1958 – 4 July 2009 (aged 50)
Zhotnevyi District, Rivne (No. 333)	Volodymyr Pylypchuk	Democratic Bloc	People's Movement of Ukraine	1990	1994	Born 18 August 1948 (age 78)
Dubno (No. 334)	Vasyl Bilyi	Communist Party of the Soviet Union	Agrarians	1990	1994	Born 6 August 1951 (age 75)
Volodymyrets (No. 335)	Serhii Kamenchuk	Communist Party of the Soviet Union	Agrarians	1990	1994	Born 8 October 1941 (age 84)
Hoshcha (No. 336)	Vasyl Rudenko	Communist Party of the Soviet Union	Independent	1990	1994	Born 17 February 1949 (age 77)
Dubrovytsia (No. 337)	Oleksandr Kostiuk	Democratic Bloc	Congress of National Democratic Forces	1990	1994	Born 1 November 1949 (age 76)
Zdolbuniv (No. 338)	Valerii Batalov	Democratic Bloc	Congress of National Democratic Forces	1990	1994	27 June 1946 – 2011 (aged 64–65)
Kostopil (No. 339)	Mykola Shershun	Independent	Congress of National Democratic Forces	1990	1994	Born 26 October 1951 (age 74)
Rivne Raion (No. 340)	Mykola Porovskyi	Democratic Bloc	Congress of National Democratic Forces (Note: Previously a member of the People's Movement of Ukraine.)	1990	1994	Born 20 June 1956 (age 70)
Sarny (No. 341)	Arkadii Yershov	Communist Party of the Soviet Union	Independent	1990	1994	21 June 1936 – c. 23 May 2005 (aged 68)

== Sumy Oblast ==
District (Number)	Deputy	Coalition	Party	Assumed office	Left office	Lifespan
Zarichnyi District, Sumy (No. 342)	Oleksandr Piskun	Democratic Bloc	People's Movement of Ukraine	1990	1994	Born 30 July 1953 (age 73)
Kovpakivskyi District, Sumy (No. 343)	Oleksandr M. Vorobiov	Democratic Platform	Party of Democratic Revival of Ukraine	1990	1994	Born 5 June 1956 (age 70)
Hlukhiv (No. 344)	Volodymyr Hrabin	Communist Party of the Soviet Union	For Social Justice	1985	1994	Born 23 July 1933 (age 93)
Konotop (No. 345)	Mykola Khomenko	Communist Party of the Soviet Union	Independent	1980	1994	Born 20 June 1934 (age 92)
Okhtyrka (No. 346)	Roman Rapii	Communist Party of the Soviet Union	Independent	1990	1994	7 September 1936 – 3 March 1998 (aged 61)
Romny (No. 347)	Volodymyr Marchenko	Communist Party of the Soviet Union	Independent	1990	1994	Born 22 October 1953 (age 72)
Shostka (No. 348)	Yurii Serbin	Democratic Bloc	Nova Ukraina	1990	1994	Born 5 March 1949 (age 77)
Bilopillia (No. 349)	Valerii Cherep	Communist Party of the Soviet Union	Agrarians	1980	1994	Born 23 March 1941 (age 85)
Krolevets (No. 350)	Ivan Hryshchenko	Democratic Bloc	Independent	1990	1994	Born 11 November 1956 (age 69)
Lebedyn (No. 351)	Anatolii Bondarenko	Democratic Bloc	Independent	1990	1994	8 May 1934 – 25 May 2015 (aged 81)
Sumy Raion (No. 352)	Oleksii Cherniavskyi	Communist Party of the Soviet Union	Agrarians	1990	1994	Born 12 March 1942 (age 84)
Trostianets (No. 353)	Ihor Ploskonos	Independent	Independent	1990	1994	29 April 1959 – 8 July 2013 (aged 54)
Yampil (No. 354)	Volodymyr Ananiev	Communist Party of the Soviet Union	Independent	1990	1994	23 March 1929 – 17 December 1996 (aged 67)

== Ternopil Oblast ==
District (Number)	Deputy	Coalition	Party	Assumed office	Left office	Lifespan
Ternopil (No. 355)	Volodymyr Kolinets	Democratic Bloc	People's Movement of Ukraine	1990	1994	19 September 1950 – 14 November 2020 (aged 70)
Berezhany (No. 356)	Leon Horokhivskyi	Democratic Bloc	Congress of National-Democratic Forces	1990	1994	15 February 1943 – 1 November 2010 (aged 67)
Zalishchyky (No. 357)	Oleksandr Shevchenko	Communist Party of the Soviet Union	For Social Justice	1990	1994	27 October 1924 – 2021 (aged 96–97)
Zbarazh (No. 358)	Dmytro Pavlychko	Democratic Bloc	Congress of National-Democratic Forces	1990	1994	28 September 1929 – 29 January 2023 (aged 93)
Zboriv (No. 359)	Kateryna Zavadska	Democratic Bloc	Independent	1990	1994	Born 3 October 1958 (age 67)
Kremenets (No. 360)	Mykhailo Matsialko	Independent	Agrarians	1990	1994	Born 15 February 1933 (age 93)
Pidvolochysk (No. 361)	Bohdan Boyko	Democratic Bloc	People's Movement of Ukraine	1990	1994	Born 29 September 1954 (age 71)
Terebovlia (No. 362)	Lev Krupa	Democratic Bloc	People's Movement of Ukraine	1990	1994	1 January 1944 – 28 December 2000 (aged 56)
Ternopil Raion (No. 363)	Maria Humeniuk	Democratic Bloc	People's Movement of Ukraine	1990	1994	Born 26 February 1948 (age 78)

== Vinnytsia Oblast ==
District (Number)	Deputy	Coalition	Party	Assumed office	Left office	Lifespan
Lenin District, Vinnytsia (No. 23)	Borys Mokin	Democratic Bloc	Independent	1990	1994	Born 3 January 1943 (age 83)
Zamostia District, Vinnytsia (No. 24)	Arsen Zinchenko	Democratic Bloc	Congress of National Democratic Forces	1990	1994	Born 20 July 1948 (age 78)
Staromiskyi District, Vinnytsia (No. 25)	Oleksii Savvin	Independent	Independent	1990	1994	Born 2 September 1938 (age 87)
Zhmerynka (No. 26)	Borys S. Oliynyk	Communist Party of the Soviet Union	Independent	1990	1994	23 June 1934 – 1 October 1999 (aged 65)
Mohyliv-Podilskyi (No. 27)	Ihor Borshchenko	Communist Party of the Soviet Union	Independent	1990	1994	Born 12 August 1966 (age 60)
Khmilnyk (No. 28)	Mykhailo Maslov	Communist Party of the Soviet Union	Independent	1990	1994	Born 29 December 1948 (age 77)
Bar (No. 29)	Vasyl Riabokon	Communist Party of the Soviet Union	Independent	1990	1994	Born 30 March 1940 (age 86)
Bershad (No. 30)	Anatoliy Matviyenko	Communist Party of the Soviet Union	Independent	1990	1994	22 March 1943 – 22 May 2020 (aged 77)
Vinnytsia Raion (No. 31)	Mykola Didyk	Communist Party of the Soviet Union	Independent	1980	1992	1 January 1935 – 24 June 2000 (aged 65)
Vinnytsia Raion (No. 31)	Polikarp Tkach	Independent	Independent	1992	1994	Born 18 December 1936 (age 89)
Haisyn (No. 32)	Hryhorii Podchos	Communist Party of the Soviet Union	Independent	1990	1994	Born 17 August 1943 (age 83)
Koziatyn (No. 33)	Hennadii Dubenkov	Communist Party of the Soviet Union	For Social Justice	1990	1994	Born 2 April 1950 (age 76)
Nemyriv (No. 34)	Vitaliy Khyzhniak	Communist Party of the Soviet Union	For Social Justice	1990	1994	25 October 1934 – 20 January 2025 (aged 90)
Pohrebyshche (No. 35)	Ivan Hrynchuk	Communist Party of the Soviet Union	Independent	1990	1994	Born 8 August 1944 (age 82)
Trostianets (No. 36)	Ivan Popyk	Communist Party of the Soviet Union	Independent	1990	1994	Born 10 August 1934 (age 92)
Tulchyn (No. 37)	Mykola Melnyk	Democratic Bloc	New Ukraine	1990	1994	Born 17 April 1943 (age 83)
Sharhorod (No. 38)	Anatolii Savchuk	Democratic Bloc	Independent	1990	1994	Born 14 December 1938 (age 87)
Yampil (No. 39)	Leonid Kravchuk	Communist Party of the Soviet Union	Communist Party of Ukraine	1990	1991	10 January 1934 – 24 June 2000 (aged 66)
Yampil (No. 39)	Kostiantyn Pyskunovskyi	Independent	Independent	1992	1994	Born 14 February 1950 (age 76)

== Volyn Oblast ==
District (Number)	Deputy	Coalition	Party	Assumed office	Left office	Lifespan
Lutsk (No. 40)	Yaroslav Dmytryshyn	Democratic Bloc	People's Movement of Ukraine	1990	1994	Born 20 January 1939 (age 87)
Tsentralnyi District, Lutsk (No. 41)	Oleksandr Hudyma	Democratic Bloc	People's Movement of Ukraine	1990	1994	Born 3 January 1950 (age 76)
Kovel (No. 42)	Andrii Mostyskyi	Democratic Bloc	Independent	1990	1994	Born 22 September 1962 (age 63)
Novovolynsk (No. 43)	Fedir Sviderskyi	Democratic Bloc	People's Movement of Ukraine	1990	1994	26 May 1949 – 26 June 2011 (aged 62)
Horokhiv (No. 44)	Andrii Bondarchuk	Democratic Bloc	People's Movement of Ukraine	1990	1994	Born 12 December 1936 (age 89)
Kamin-Kashyrskyi (No. 45)	Pavlo Vitsiak	Democratic Bloc	Congress of National Democratic Forces	1990	1994	Born 25 December 1934 (age 91)
Kivertsi (No. 46)	Valentyn Lemish	Communist Party of the Soviet Union	Independent	1990	1994	22 November 1937 – 13 June 2003 (aged 65)
Kivertsi (No. 47)	Mykhailo Parasunko	Communist Party of the Soviet Union	Independent	1990	1994	Born 20 April 1943 (age 83)
Turiisk (No. 48)	Yurii Babanskyi	Communist Party of the Soviet Union	For Social Justice	1990	1994	Born 20 December 1948 (age 77)

== Zakarpattia Oblast ==
District (Number)	Deputy	Coalition	Party	Assumed office	Left office	Lifespan
Uzhhorod (No. 167)	Ihor Yeliashevych	Independent	Independent	1990	1994	20 October 1939 – 12 June 2006 (aged 66)
Mukachevo (No. 168)	Volodymyr Danchevskyi	Communist Party of the Soviet Union	Independent	1990	1994	Born 16 May 1936 (age 90)
Berehove (No. 169)	Vasyl Shepa	Democratic Bloc	People's Movement of Ukraine	1990	1994	28 March 1931 – 13 March 2011 (aged 79)
Vynohradiv (No. 170)	Andrii Polychko	Communist Party of the Soviet Union	Independent	1990	1992	Born 22 April 1946 (age 80)
Vynohradiv (No. 170)	Stanislav Babenko	Independent	Independent	1993	1994	Born 4 January 1947 (age 79)
Irshava (No. 171)	Ivan Halas	Communist Party of the Soviet Union	Independent	1990	1994	Born 20 February 1933 (age 93)
Mukachevo Raion (No. 172)	Dmytro Kelman	Communist Party of the Soviet Union	Independent	1990	1994	Born 8 November 1940 (age 85)
Perechyn (No. 173)	Ivan Herts	Democratic Bloc	People's Movement of Ukraine	1990	1994	Born 19 September 1936 (age 89)
Perechyn (No. 174)	Ivan Habor	Communist Party of the Soviet Union	Independent	1990	1994	1 January 1945 – 11 May 2017 (aged 72)
Svaliava (No. 175)	Mykhailo Voloshchuk	Communist Party of the Soviet Union	For Social Justice	1990	1994	10 November 1934 – 11 May 2017 (aged 72)
Tiachiv (No. 176)	Viktor Bed	Democratic Bloc	People's Movement of Ukraine	1990	1994	Born 5 May 1964 (age 62)
Khust (No. 177)	Ivan Popovych	Independent	Independent	1990	1992	1938 – 21 March 1992 (aged 53–54)
Khust (No. 177)	Dmytro Dorchynets	Independent	Independent	1992	1994	Born 24 October 1937 (age 88)

== Zaporizhzhia Oblast ==
Name	Nationality	Electoral district	District number	Remarks
Leonid Bilyi		Melitopol	No. 193	
Oleksandr Bilousenko	Ukrainian	Tokmak	No. 188	
Ivan Boyko	Ukrainian	Kamiansko-Dniprovsk	No. 192	
Oleksandr Vorobyov	Russian	Polohy	No. 194	
Ivan Homenyuk	Ukrainian	Zaporizhzhia	No. 191	left 18 June 1992
Volodymyr Demianov	Ukrainian	Berdyansk	No. 189	left 18 June 1992
Anatoliy Dubovskiy	Russian	Zaporizhzhia-Ordzhonikidzevskyi	No. 183	
Valeriy Izmalkov	Russian	Zaporizhzhia-Shevchenkivskyi	No. 185	
Yevheniy Korolenko	Russian	Zaporizhzhia-Komynarskyi	No. 181	
Anatoliy Nikolenko		Berdyansk	No. 189	from 14 December 1992
Borys Oliynyk		Zaporizhzhia	No. 191	from 14 December 1992
Volodymyr Petrenko	Ukrainian	Pryazovske	No. 195	
Oleksiy Porada	Ukrainian	Zaporizhzhia-Levanevskyi	No. 182	
Oleksiy Prychkin	Ukrainian	Vasylivka	No. 190	
Volodymyr Romanchuk	Russian	Zaporizhzhia-Leninskyi	No. 178	
Vitaliy Satskyi	Ukrainian	Zaporizhzhia-Zavodskyi	No. 180	
Viktor Sychov		Melitopol city	No. 187	
Viktor Sliesarenko	Ukrainian	Zaporizhzhia-Zhovtnevyi	No. 179	
Serhiy Sobolyev	Ukrainian	Zaporizhzhia-Khortytskyi	No. 184	
Volodymyr Shevchenko	Russian	Berdyansk city	No. 186	

== Zhytomyr Oblast ==
Name	Nationality	Electoral district	District number	Remarks
Valeriy Bondaraw	Belarusian	Ovruch	No. 164	
Mykhailo Boreiko	Ukrainian	Korostyshiv	No. 161	
Valentyn Budko	Ukrainian	Malyn	No. 163	
Volodymyr Hayovyi	Ukrainian	Chervonoarmiysk	No. 166	
Mykola Dupliak	Ukrainian	Andrushivka	No. 159	
Yakaw Zaiko	Belarusian	Zhytomyr-Bohunskyi	No. 153	
Vitaliy Melnychuk		Zhytomyr-Promyslovyi	No. 155	
Fedir Panasiuk	Ukrainian	Liubar	No. 162	
Vasyl Rudyk	Ukrainian	Olevsk	No. 165	
Oleksandr Suhoniako	Ukrainian	Zhytomyr-Korolyovskyi	No. 154	
Volodymyr Fedorov	Russian	Zviahel	No. 158	
Oleksiy Khyliuk		Berdychiv	No. 156	
Stanislava Yanushevych	Ukrainian	Zhytomyr	No. 160	
Volodymyr Yastenko	Russian	Korosten	No. 157	

== Sevastopol ==
District (Number)	Deputy	Coalition	Party	Assumed office	Left office	Lifespan
Lenin District (No. 236)	Yuriy Stupnikov	Communist Party of the Soviet Union	Independent	1990	1994	Born 12 March 1942 (age 84)
Balaklava (No. 237)	Vladilen Nekrasov	Communist Party of the Soviet Union	Independent	1990	1994	Born 17 July 1934 (age 92)
Gagarinsky District (No. 238)	Hennadii Vanieiev	Independent	Independent	1990	1994	23 June 1927 – 5 July 2004 (aged 77)
Nakhimov District (No. 239)	Oleksandr Kondryakov	Communist Party of the Soviet Union	Crimean Regional Deputies' Group	1990	1994	16 February 1953 – 5 August 2021 (aged 68)

== See also ==
- 1990 Ukrainian parliamentary election
