= Leonid Yakovyshyn =

Ukrainian politician and publicist (1939–2025)

- Леонід Яковишин
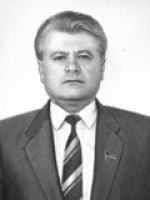
- Official portrait, 1990

Member of the Verkhovna Rada
- In office 15 May 1990 – 10 May 1994

Personal details
- Born: Leonid Hryhorovych Yakovyshyn; May 19, 1939 Koziatyn, Vinnytsia Oblast, Ukraine, Soviet Union
- Died: 26 July 2025 (aged 86) Kyiv, Ukraine

Leonid Hryhorovych Yakovyshyn (Ukrainian: Леонід Григорович Яковишин; 19 May 1939 – 26 July 2025) was a Ukrainian farmer, politician and publicist. He was the General Director of Zemlya i Volya LLC.

== Life and career ==
Yakovyshyn was born on 19 May 1939 in Koziatyn, Vinnytsia Oblast. He was a member of the 1st Ukrainian Verkhovna Rada (1990–1994).

Yakovyshyn died at the Shalimov National Scientific Center for Surgery and Transplantology on 26 July 2025, at the age of 86.

== Awards ==
- Hero of Ukraine with the Order of the State (22 August 2004) — for outstanding personal services to the Ukrainian state in the development of the agro-industrial complex, achievement of high production indicators, many years of selfless work.
