= Anatoliy Butenko =

Ukrainian politician (1938–2021)

- Анатолій Бутенко
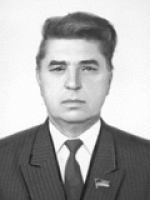

People's Deputy of Ukraine
- In office 15 May 1990 – 10 May 1994

Personal details
- Born: 23 February 1938 Myrhorod, Ukrainian SSR
- Died: 4 January 2021 (aged 82) Odesa, Ukraine
- Party: CPSU; KPU

Anatoliy Ivanovych Butenko (Ukrainian: Анатолій Іванович Буте́нко, romanized: Anatolii Ivanovych Butenko; 23 February 1938 – 4 January 2021) was a Ukrainian politician who served as a Deputy from 1990 to 1994. He was a member of the 1st Ukrainian Verkhovna Rada.

== Biography ==
Anatoliy Butenko was born on February 23, 1938, in Myrhorod, Poltava Oblast, Ukrainian SSR. Initially he worked as a laborer, before graduating from Odesa Polytechnic Institute and the Academy of Social Sciences under the Central Committee of the Communist Party of the Soviet Union. He began his political career in 1970 as the first secretary of the Illichivsk District Committee of the Communist Party of Ukraine in Odesa. From 1980 to 1992 he worked his way up from deputy, fiirst deputy, and then Chairman of the Odesa Regional Executive Committee.

In March 1990, Anatolii Butenko was elected to the first convocation of the Verkhovna Rada of Ukraine, where he was a member of the Communist Party of Ukraine faction and a member of the Defence and State Security Committee.

Outside of politics, he headed the Department of Entrepreneurship Development at the Institute of Market Problems and Economic‑Environmental Research of the National Academy of Sciences of Ukraine from its establishment in 1992 up to his death. He also specifically studied the sustainable socio-economic development of Ukraine and in its oblasts, and was one of the first in Ukraine to study how entrepreneurship emerged in the transition economy after the fall of the Soviet Union and how a private sector was built.
