= Volodymyr Pylypchuk =

Ukrainian economist and politician (1948–2025)

- Володимир Пилипчук
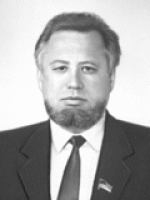
- Official portrait, 1990

People's Deputy of Ukraine

1st convocation
- In office 15 May 1990 – 10 May 1994
- Constituency: Zhovtnevy district (Rivne) No.333 (People's Movement of Ukraine)

2nd convocation
- In office 11 May 1995 – 12 May 1998
- Constituency: Zaliznychny (Ivano-Frankivsk oblast) No.196

Personal details
- Born: 18 June 1948 Hlynsk, Zdolbuniv Raion, Rivne Oblast, Ukrainian SSR, USSR
- Died: 22 January 2025 (aged 76) Rivne, Rivne Oblast, Ukraine
- Occupation: Economist, politician, writer

Volodymyr Mefodiyоvych Pylypchuk (Ukrainian: Володимир Мефодійович Пилипчук; 18 June 1948 – 22 January 2025) was a Ukrainian economist and politician. The parliamentarian of The Verkhovna Rada. Companion of the second-and third-class Order "For Merit". Member of the National Academy of Economic Sciences of Ukraine, professor.

== Early life and education ==
Volodymyr Pylypchuk was born on 18 June 1948, in the Hlynsk village of Zdolbuniv Raion of Rivne oblast of the Ukrainian SSR (now Ukraine) to Mefodiy and Neonila Pylypchuk.

After completing his secondary education at The Secondary School of Hlynsk, Pylypchuk studied at the Kyiv Technological Institute of Light Industry, from which he graduated in 1971 as an engineer.

In the period from 1971 until 1982 Pylypchuk worked as an engineer of the Kyiv start-and-adjustment bureau "Orgenergoavtomatika", a senior engineer, the head of the laboratory measuring technology and automation, a specialist The Lyubomyriv silicate plant, the chief specialist of the Rivne Regional Association of industrial and construction materials, director of the Mogilyansk plant of drain tubes.

He studied at the Scientific Research Institute of industrial and building materials USSR during 1982 and 1985 for the post-graduate work on his dissertation in Economics which he defended in 1985 receiving the degree of Candidate of Science (roughly Ph.D. equivalent).

A year later, Pylypchuk became a senior lecturer of economics at The Rivne National University of Water and Environmental Engineering.

He became a full member of the Academy of Economic Sciences of Ukraine in 1993.

In 1994 Pylypchuk studied at the Institute of Economics in Boulder (Colorado, US) training program for government-leading cadres for Ukraine's market economy.

Pylypchuk worked as a Professor at the Kyiv Institute of National Economy in the period from 1991 to 1993 and as an academic adviser of the Institute of Mathematical Modelling in Economics.

== Political career ==
From 1975 to 1990, Pylypchuk was a member of the Communist Party and left the Communist Party a year before the State Committee of the State of Emergency. In the early 80's he was the deputy Ostrog District Council of People's Deputies (Rivne region).

Pylypchuk was one of the organizers of the socio-political organization of the People's Movement of Ukraine (Rukh) in 1989 and a member of the Economic Board and a member of the Great Council of Rukh, the head of the Rukh's cell in the Ukrainian Institute of Engineers of Water Management, and the head of Rivne regional organization People's Movement of Ukraine. He had not discontinued his membership of Rukh. After the disintegration of Rukh in protest against these processes, he had not joined any party (including the "fragments" Rukh).

In 1990 Pylypchuk was elected to the Rivne Regional Council of People's Deputies, but later gave up power due to the election of Chairman of the Permanent Commission of the Verkhovna Rada of Ukraine.

Pylypchuk was sworn into Ukrainian parliament in 1990. As an MP, he was the Member of the Presidium of Verkhovna Rada and the Chairman of the Standing Committee on economic reforms and national economy management.

In May 1995, Pylypchuk was elected to the second convocation of the parliament and served his mandate until May 1998.

The Commission (in Soviet times) led by Pylypchuk organized the development of the hryvnia design, the calculation of the amount of currency in circulation and the determination of the structure of denominations. He was an initiator of the creation in Ukraine of the production capability for the manufacture of new nation currency.

As an MP of the 1st convocation, he was the co-legislator and the initiator of the development by the Commission on economic reforms and management of the national economy of 196 bills (114 of them were passed by Verkhovna Randa) there he participated in the finance and banking work group. These bills have focused on the sovereignization of Ukraine's economy and its simultaneous transformation to a market economy.

The following are the most important:

- Declaration of State Sovereignty of Ukraine
- The Concept and Program of Ukraine's transition to a market economy;
- Resolution of the Verkhovna Rada of Ukraine on the introduction of the national currency - the hryvnia;
- The Law of Ukraine "On economic independence of Ukraine";
- Law of Property Act;
- The Law of Ukraine «On entrepreneurship»;
- The Law of Ukraine «On Securities and Stock Exchange»;
- The Law of Ukraine «On Banks and Banking Activity»;
- The Law of Ukraine «On Auditing»;
- Bankruptcy Law;
- The Law of Ukraine "On Pledge" (property);
- The Law of Ukraine «On rental property»;
- The Law of Ukraine «On Companies»;
- The Law of Ukraine "On concessions";
- The Law of Ukraine «On Foreign Economic Activity»;
- The Law of Ukraine «On Protection of Foreign Investments».

Commission under Pylypchuk's leadership developed all anti-monopoly legislation, laws on the development of competition, anti-dumping and customs legislation. Prepared by Volodymyr Pylypchuk Draft Law of Ukraine on privatization by subscribing to the property via a unified computer network that excluded the voucher privatization scheme, interference in the privatization process and abuse during her realization was not supported.

He was a member of the People's Council, the Minority (the structure of opposition to the ruling Communist "239 group") in the Verkhovna Rada of the 1st convocation. Pylypchuk was nominated twice for the post of Prime Minister of Ukraine by the People's Council and the double candidature of Volodymyr Pylypchuk did not find the necessary number of votes.

From 1992 to 1994 he was a Member of the Parliamentary Assembly of the Organization for Security and Cooperation in Europe (OSCE PA), the PA OSCE parliamentarians were twice elected vice-president of the OSCE PA General Committee on Economic Affairs, Science, Technology and Environment. He played on the PA OSCE reports at the Prague Economic Forum, at the Summit of Ministers of Economy of the EU in Edinburgh, at meetings of senior officials of the OSCE Parliamentary Assembly and European leaders in Malta at the General Committee of the OSCE Parliamentary Assembly in Budapest, Jack (Malta), Vienna and Helsinki. Served as an expert "of seven" in Tokyo.

The aims of foreign policy efforts of Pylypchuk were: recognition of Ukraine as an equal partner in international law, introduction a "climate" for Ukraine's integration into the international political and financial structures, removal of Ukraine discriminatory restrictions in the international division of labor and getting her preferences.

As deputy to the 2nd convocation of the Verkhovna Rada, Volodymyr Pylypchuk independently developed the 28 draft laws, including 3 programs aimed at surmounting the economic crisis.

After retiring, Pylypchuk continued to engage in analytical activities of ongoing economic and political situations in Ukraine. He was well known as the author of a large number of analytical articles.

Pylypchuk published more than 250 scientific papers and publications on macroeconomics and microeconomics, more than 30 times he presented reports at international conferences, including Harvard, Yale, Indianapolis, Toronto Universities, the Massachusetts Institute of Technology, as well as scientific and research institutions of Japan, France, Britain, Germany and Canada. Areas of research: "macro- and microeconomics." Sphere of scientific interests: the stability theories of the economy.

== Personal life and death ==
His father, Pylypchuk Mephodiy Tymonovych (1917–1989), was born and lived in Hlynsk, Rivne region. He worked as an agronomist at the collective farm 'Druzhba' in the village Hlyns. His mother, Pylypchuk Neonila Myronivna (1914–1987), was born and lived in the same village. His sister, Galyna (1937–2023), qualified as an agronomist, and his brother, Vasyl (born 1956), is a mechanical engineer.

Pylypchuk was married and had two children; a daughter and a son, as well as four grandchildren. They all live, work and study in Ukraine.

Pylypchuk died on 22 January 2025, at the age of 76.

== Awards ==
During his public service Volodymyr Pylypchuk received numerous civil and state awards and recognition, including the Order of Merit, 3rd class (in 1998) and 2nd Class (in 2009).
