= Henrikh Altunian =

- Генріх Ованесович Алтунян
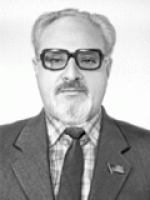
- Altunian in 1990
- Born: Henrikh Ovanesovych Altunian; 24 November 1933; Tbilisi, Georgian SSR
- Died: 30 June 2005 (aged 71)
- Resting place: Kharkiv
- Occupations: Activist; Politician

Henrikh Ovanesovych Altunian (Ukrainian: Генріх Ованесович Алтунян, 24 November 1933 – 30 June 2005) was an Armenian-Ukrainian activist, dissident and victim of Communist repression, who served as a member of the First Convocation of Verkhovna Rada between 1990 and 1994.

== Biography ==
Henrikh Altunian was born on 24 November 1933 in Tbilisi, Georgian SSR, to an Armenian family. His father was a military serviceman. In 1944 the family moved to Kharkiv, where Henrikh entered the local aviation engineering high school in 1951. After graduating in 1956, Altunian spent four years serving as a military engineer at an army base in Uzyn, before returning to work as a teacher in Kharkiv.

Altunian's dissident activities started in 1964, when he voiced his distrust in the new Communist Party leadership at a meeting of his chair's party cell. Due to his connections to members of the dissident movement, as well as his participation in publicizing of an address to state authorities by Andrei Sakharov, in 1968 Altunian got demoted from the rank of major, was relieved from his military position and lost his membership in the Communist Party. During the following months he worked as an engineer in Kharkiv.

In 1969 Altunian entered the Initiative Group for the Defense of Human Rights in the USSR. As member of the group, he signed several petitions in defense of Crimean Tatars and co-authored an address to the United Nations. After signing a letter against the forced psychiatric treatment of general Petro Hryhorenko, in 1969 he was arrested and imprisoned for 3 years at a labour camp in Krasnoyarsk Krai. After his release, he worked as a locksmith in Kharkiv. In 1980 Altunian was arrested for a second time, with prohibited literature, including a copy of Alexander Solzhenitsyn's Gulag Archipelago, being discovered in his residence. In 1981 Kharkiv Regional Court sentenced him to 7 years of labour camps and 5 years of exile. He spent the following years in Kuchino Camp in Perm Oblast, being later transferred to Chistopol Prison in Tatar ASSR and Barashevo in Mordovian ASSR. Under pressure from the international community, in 1987 authorities were forced to release and pardon Altunian, despite him never acknowledging any guilt.

Following his release, Altunian returned to his job as a locksmith. In 1990 he was officially rehabilitated, and during the same year was appointed head of Kharkiv City People's Control Committee. In March 1990 Altunian was elected member of the Supreme Soviet of the Ukrainian Soviet Socialist Republic as an independent politician. In parliament he joined the People's Council and headed the Kharkiv regional organization of the People's Movement of Ukraine. Altunian was also a co-founder of the Kharkiv branch of Memorial and headed the Kharkiv Banking Congress. As a deputy, he worked on the adoption of the law "On Rehabilitation of the Victims of Political Repression". Altunian was a candidate during the 1994 Ukrainian parliamentary election, but failed to get reelected. During the Orange Revolution in 2004 Altunian became a member of the National Salvation Committee and organized demonstrations in support of Viktor Yushchenko in Kharkiv.

== Personal life and death ==
Altunian was married and had two children. He died on 30 June 2005 from complications of a surgery and was buried in Kharkiv.

== Commemoration ==
In April 2026, the Kharkiv City Council adopted a decision to install a memorial plaque dedicated to Altunian in one of the city's streets following an appeal by the city's Armenian community.
