= Volodymyr Medvedev =

Ukrainian politician (born 1948)

- Володимир Медвєдєв
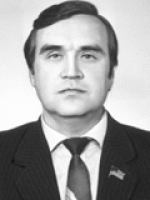

Member of the Verkhovna Rada
- In office 15 May 1990 – 10 May 1994

Personal details
- Born: Volodymyr Hur'yanovych Medvedev; 19 January 1948 (age 78) Kizel, Russian SFSR, Soviet Union

Volodymyr Hur'yanovych Medvedev (Ukrainian: Володимир Гур'янович Медвєдєв; born 19 January 1948), is a Russian-born Ukrainian politician, activist, and former miner who had served as a member of parliament, People's Deputy of Ukraine of the 1st convocation of the Verkhovna Rada from 1990 to 1994.

Prior to politics, Medvedev was foreman of the workers of the mine named after Lenin Komsomol of Ukraine of the Pavlograd industrial association "Pavlogradvugil" in Dnipropetrovsk Oblast.

== Biography ==
Volodymyr Medvedev was born in Kizel, Perm Krai, on 19 January 1948, in a family of workers, and is an ethnic Russian. He graduated from the special secondary education, and was a mining technician.

In 1964, Medvedev was a student of the Kizel mining technical school. In 1968, he was a mining master at Kizel. From 1968 to 1970, he served in the Soviet Army. In 1970, he was a senior laboratory assistant at the mining and geological laboratory "VNDIpromzoloto" in Chita. In 1971, he became apprentice of the mine construction department No. 3 of the Dniproshaktobud plant of Dnipropetrovsk Oblast. In 1981, he became the foreman of the miners of the mine named after Lenin Komsomol of Ukraine of the Pavlograd coal mining industrial association "Pavlogradvugil" of Dnipropetrovsk Oblast. He was a member of the Ukrainian Republican Council of Trade Unions. In 1990, Medvedev was nominated as a candidate for people's deputies by the labor collective of the mine named after Lenin Komsomol.

On 18 March 1990, Medvedev was elected a member of parliament, People's Deputy of Ukraine, 2nd round, with 47.17% of the votes, and 12 applicants to the Verkhovna Rada. He took office on 15 May. He was a member of the Commission of the Verkhovna Rada of Ukraine on Defense and State Security. He had been the candidate for the Verkhovna Rada of the 2nd convocation nominated by voters 1st round 12.22% of votes 4th place out of 9 applicants, however, he failed to be reelected to parliament.

== Family ==
Medvedev is married, with two children.
