= Hanna Arkhipova =

Ukrainian politician (born 1939)

- Ганна Архіпова
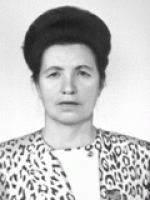

Member of the Verkhovna Rada
- In office 15 May 1990 – 10 May 1994

Personal details
- Born: Hanna Hryhorivna Arkhipova; 5 April 1939 (age 87) Pyriatyn, Ukraine, Soviet Union

Hanna Hryhorivna Arkhipova (born 5 April 1939) is a Ukrainian politician. People's Deputy of Ukraine of the 1st convocation.

== Early life and education ==
Hanna Arkhipova was born on 5 April 1939, in Pyriatyn, Poltava region, Ukrainian SSR, to a family of employees. She graduated from Kyiv Taras Shevchenko State University with a degree in history.

== Career ==
In 1956, Hanna Arkhipova worked at a fish factory in Primorsk, Leningrad region. In 1962, she was an instructor at the Khmelnytskyi Lenin's Communist Union of Young Ukraine and the second secretary of the Kamianets-Podilskyi Lenin's Communist Union of Young Ukraine of the Khmelnytskyi Region. In 1965, Arkhipova lectured at the Slavutsky Committee of the Communist Party of Ukraine. She was a secretary, Second, and then the First Secretary of the Slavutsky Committee of the Communist Party of Ukraine.

From 1964 to 1991, Arkhipova was a member of Communist Party of the Soviet Union. She was a Deputy of district, city, and regional councils. Arkhipova was nominated as a candidate for People's Deputies by the labor collective of the collective farm named after Vasily Chapaev, Slavutsky district.

On 18 March 1990, Arkhipova was elected as a People's Deputy of Ukraine with 46.88% of votes among 3 applicants. Her parliamentary powers terminated on 10 May 1994. She was a member of the "For Social Justice" and "Rada" groups. Arkhipova was the Head of the subcommittee on women's work and lifestyle, the Verkhovna Rada of Ukraine Commission on women's affairs, family protection, motherhood, and childhood.

== Private life ==
Hanna Arkhipova is married and has a child.

== Awards and honors ==
Hanna Arkhipova was awarded the Order of Friendship of Peoples and various medals.
