= Mikhail Bakharev =

Ukrainian-Russian politician (1947–2025)

- Михаил Бахарев
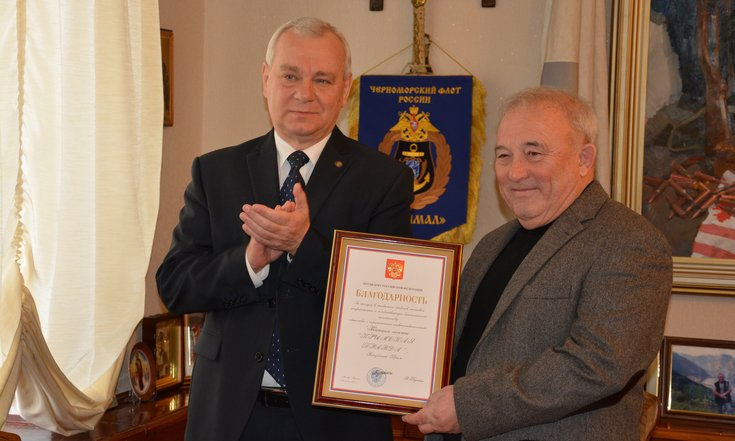
- Bakharev (right) in 2016

Deputy Chairman of the Supreme Council of Crimea
- In office 19 May 2006 – 16 November 2010
- Preceded by: Vladimir Zakoretsky
- Succeeded by: Grigory Ioffe

Personal details
- Born: Mikhail Alekseevich Bakharev; 28 January 1947 Simferopol, Crimean Oblast, Russian SFSR, USSR
- Died: 20 October 2025 (aged 78)
- Party: CPSU (1974–1991); KPU; Russian Unity
- Education: V. I. Vernadsky Taurida National University; High Political School of the Central Committee of the Communist Party of Ukraine
- Occupation: Journalist

Mikhail Alekseevich Bakharev (Russian: Михаил Алексеевич Бахарев; Ukrainian: Михайло Олексійович Бахарєв; 28 January 1947 – 20 October 2025) was a Ukrainian-Russian politician. A member of the Communist Party of Ukraine and Russian Unity, he served as deputy chairman of the Supreme Council of Crimea from 2006 to 2010.

Bakharev died on 20 October 2025, at the age of 78.
