= Demyan Hanul =

Ukrainian activist (1993–2025)

- Дем'ян Ганул

Leader of the Right Sector's Odesa Branch
- In office 2014–2016

Personal details
- Born: 6 October 1993 Novoselytsia, Ulyanovka Raion, Kirovohrad Oblast, Ukraine
- Died: 14 March 2025 (aged 31) Odesa, Ukraine
- Party: Right Sector

Military service
- Battles/wars: Russo-Ukraine war: Russian invasion of Ukraine

Demyan Vadymovych Hanul (Ukrainian: Дем'ян Вадимович Ганул; 6 October 1993 – 14 March 2025) was an Ukrainian activist and public figure best known for his blogging and leadership of the Street Front non-governmental organization (NGO). Hanul participated in the Revolution of Dignity in Kyiv, as well as the 2014 Odesa clashes against pro-Russian activists. Hanul was assassinated in Odesa on 14 March 2025.

== Background ==
Demyan Hanul was born on 6 October 1993. He participated in the Revolution of Dignity in Kyiv, as well as the 2014 Odesa clashes against pro-Russian activists. Hanul operated a blog, as well as a non-governmental organization (NGO) named Street Front, which he used to support rallies, as well as fund-raise for the Ukrainian armed forces. Hanul was the leader of Right Sector's Odesa cell from 2014 to 2016. After leaving Right Sector Hanul worked as a history teacher. He had campaigned hard for the deconstruction of Soviet and Imperial Russian monuments across Ukraine. Hanul and his organization also rallied flash mobs targeting restaurants in Odesa whose employees spoke Russian.

After the outbreak of the Russian invasion of Ukraine in 2022, Hanul volunteered for the Ukrainian army. Hanul had an extensive rap-sheet of traffic accidents and traffic violations. In one case the police found 30 rounds of ammunition, a RGD-5 grenade, three grenades for a grenade launcher, and body armour in his car. In 2020 Hanul survived a drive-by shooting. In May 2023, Hanul would be subjected to an attack, being beaten in the streets of Odesa. In July 2024, Hanul reported that Russian hackers had released personal information about him, and his family, and placed a $10,000 bounty on his head.

Hanul's father also participated in the Revolution of Dignity, and also served in the 28th Mechanized Brigade during the Battle of Kyiv.

== Assassination ==
On 14 March 2025, the National Police of Ukraine announced that Hanul had been shot twice in the head by a short-barrel firearm in central Odesa on 13 March. Police believe that the shooter was acting under a contract.

Questions about the killing arose during the Verkhovna Rada question hour. The case has been personally taken over by Ihor Klymenko, Ukraine's Internal Minister. Klymenko stated that there were "specific leads" the police were following. The killing, and a clear image of the suspect, were caught on CCTV near the scene of the crime.

Pro-Russian media outlet Tipichanya Odesa had reported that his shooter was in "military uniform" but this was denied by the National Police. Another outlet, Dumska, had reported that the killer surrendered himself to police custody, which the police have also denied. At 2:12 pm UTC on 14 March Serhii Shalaiev, a man matching the description and image of Hanul's shooter, was arrested at his apartment, with a hidden weapon matching that used in the shooting found. Shalaiev was a 46-year-old local resident, a Ukrainian soldier who had deserted his unit on 23 February. Shalaiev plead guilty to the murder of Hanul on 16 March with local police and the SBU investigating the murder as either; a contract killing, a crime of personal animosity, and an assassination linked to Russia.
