= Viktor Bed =

Bishop of Mukachevo and Carpathian
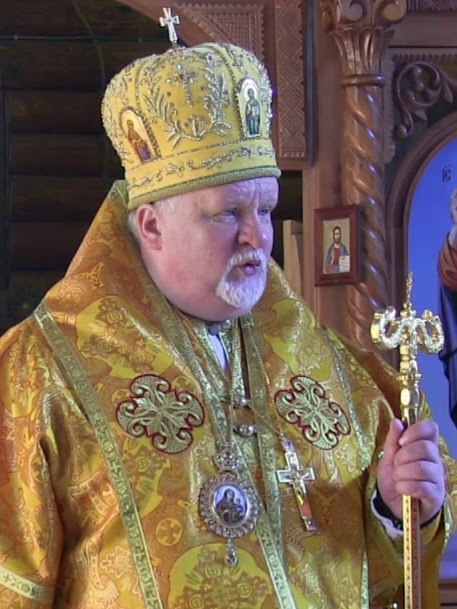
- September 7, 2020
- Native name: Віктор Васильович Бедь
- Church: Orthodox Church of Ukraine
- Metropolis: Mukachevo and Carpathian
- Elected: June 5, 2015
- In office: August 14, 2015
- Predecessor: Volodymyr Romaniuk

Personal details
- Born: Viktor Vasylovych Bed; 5 May 1964 (age 62) Tyachiv, Ukrainian SFSR, Soviet Union

Viktor (Bed) (secular name Віктор Васильович Бедь; born on May 5, 1964), is a bishop of the Orthodox Church of Ukraine (before that UOC (MP), UAOC), elected on June 3, 2015, the permanent member of the Holy Synod of the Orthodox Church of Ukraine, and is the Bishop of the Mukachevo-Carpathian Diocese of the PSCU.

He was a member of parliament, serving as a People's Deputy of Ukraine in the first convocation from 1990 to 1994. He was a co-founder and member of the anti-communist faction "People's Council" in the Verkhovna Rada, and was the Secretary of the Opposition Radical Group in the Verkhovna Rada, headed by Vyacheslav Chornovil, from 1990 to 1994.

He holds doctorates in theology and law and is a professor and academician. He is a first-rank civil servant. He was a member of the National Union of Journalists and of the Association of Lawyers of Ukraine.

== Early life and education ==
Bed was born on May 5, 1964, in Tyachev, Transcarpathian region in a family of engineers. His father was Vasyl Ivanovych, and his mother Kateryna Kyryllivna.

Bed spent his childhood in Transcarpathia, in the village of Teresva of the Tyachiv district.

From 1982 to 1983, he studied at the law department of the Kiev technical school of the hotel industry, and in 1983, became a student of the Law Faculty of Ivan Franko State University of Lviv State University, from which he graduated with honors in 1988.

== Career ==
=== Early career ===
After graduating from university, until 1994, he worked in the Transcarpathian Regional Board of Advocates in the post of lawyer in 1988, and therefore, in 1989, he was a lawyer of Tyachivska, and later Uzhgorod district legal consultations.

In the late 1980s and early 1990s, he actively participated in national-patriotic competitions for Ukraine's state independence. He was one of the co-founders and leaders of the People's Movement of Ukraine for restructuring in Transcarpathia.

Between 1989 and 1991 he was elected chairman of the Tyachiv district organization.

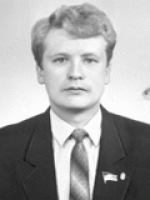
Bed's portrait as a Member of the Verkhovna Rada, 1990

=== 1990s ===
He was elected to the Ukrainian parliament on 18 March 1990 as a People's Deputy from Tyachiv (Zakarpattia Oblast), winning 56.2% of the vote. In the Verkhovna Rada, he co-founded the anti-communist “People’s Council,” served as secretary of its radical faction under Vyacheslav Chornovil, and participated in committees on law enforcement, defense, and the transition of the Committee on State Security into the Security Service of Ukraine. He was also involved in the Provisional Investigation Commission for the Chernobyl accident and the Constitutional Commission.

From 1991–1992, he chaired the Transcarpathian branch of the Narodny Rukh of Ukraine (NRU). Academically, he was promoted to associate professor and headed departments at Uzhgorod State University and the Transcarpathian Institute of MAUP.

In 1992, he founded the Bureau “Silver Land” in Uzhgorod and launched the Silver Land Weekly, a national-democratic newspaper. Following NRU’s transformation into a political party, he left to co-found and lead the Christian-People’s Union of Transcarpathia.

He co-authored several legislative drafts, including laws on Ukraine’s independence, sovereignty, the police, armed forces, judiciary, security services, and prosecution.

Bed was also active in local politics, serving on Tyachiv and Uzhgorod city councils, and held leadership roles in the Union of Advocates of Ukraine. Academically, he earned a Doctor of Philosophy in law (1998), a Candidate of Law in legal psychology (1999), and was granted the title of Professor of Law.

=== 2000s ===
During 2002 and 2009, Viktor Vasilyevich headed the Transcarpathian regional center of Taras Shevchenko Scientific Society. He was then elected Honorary Head. In 2003, he was the head of the Transcarpathian Branch of the Union of Advocates of Ukraine membership, in which he stopped at his own request in 2006.

In 2003, he received the academic title of professor of state and canonical law (Uzhgorod Ukrainian Theological Academy named after Cyril and Methodius of the Ukrainian Orthodox Church). At the same year, he received the academic title of associate professor of law (Ministry of Education and Science of Ukraine). With the blessing of Metropolitan of Kyiv and All Ukraine Vladimir (Sabodan) on 24 October 2004, Bishop of Mukachevo and Uzhgorod Agapit (Bevtsik) was ordained a deacon, and on October 8, 2006 - to the priest (priest) with a subsequent uplift on May 24, 2007.

On 20 October 2008, by order of the Ministry of Education and Science of Ukraine, Professor, Archimandrite Victor (Bed), with the blessing of the Blessed Metropolitan Volodymyr (Sabodan), was introduced from the Ukrainian Orthodox Church into the newly created Public Council on cooperation with churches and religious organizations at the Ministry of Education and Science.

As a scientist Archimandrite Victor (Bed), he published more than 250 scientific works, published three textbooks (including under the stamp of the Ministry of Education and Science of Ukraine), one monograph and dozens of educational and methodological materials in the field of theology, state and law theory, history of state and law, constitutional and criminal law.

=== 2010s ===
In 2010, Victor Bed defended his dissertation and earned a Doctor of Theological Sciences from the Uzhgorod Ukrainian Theological Academy (UOC).

On 20 March, with the blessing of Metropolitan Volodymyr (Sabodan), he took monastic vows in Thessaloniki, Greece, becoming an Archimandrite; this was later disputed by the Moscow Patriarchate.

In 2011, he earned a Doctor of Laws and was appointed Commissioner of the Ukrainian Orthodox Church for Higher Education and Science, participating in efforts to recognize spiritual academic degrees at the state level.

On 23 December 2014 the Holy Synod of the UOC‑MP (Moscow Patriarchate) decided to forbid Archimandrite Viktor (Bedya) from “sacred acts” and dissolved the Uzhhorod Ukrainian Theological Academy. Reasons given included allegations that Bed had misled church authorities as to where he had been tonsured.

After leaving the staff of the Metropolitan of the Orthodox Church of Hellas, Archimandrite Victor (Bed) was admitted to the clergy of the Ukrainian Autocephalous Orthodox Church and appointed administrator of the Carpathian Diocese.

On 14 August 2015, he was ordained a bishop of Mukachevo and Carpathian and appointed to the UAOC Diocese.

He was active in the movement for Ukrainian ecclesiastical autocephaly, signing a 2018 appeal to Ecumenical Patriarch Bartholomew I and participating in the unification council at St. Sophia Cathedral on 15 December 2018, which established the local Autocephalous Orthodox Church of Ukraine.

=== Further education ===
Without leaving his work, Bed continued to study and received several higher education qualifications at the following levels: Master of Finance (2002), Master of Psychology (2002), Master of Theology (Higher Spiritual Education, 2005) and Master of theology, Teacher of Higher Education (2010).

== Personal life ==
From 1993 to 2007, he was married to Yuliyana Petrivna (née Gavrilko). He has two sons: Viktor (born in 1993) and Yulian (born in 1995).

== Honours ==
For public, professional, scientific-pedagogical and spiritual-educational activities he was awarded a number of medals and orders of the Ukrainian Orthodox Church of the Moscow Patriarchate, the Russian Orthodox Church and the Orthodox Church of Hellas, honorary certificates and thanks of the Ministry of Education and Science, Youth and Sports, Youth and Sports. Commission of the Bar of Ukraine at the Cabinet of Ministers of Ukraine, the Association of Higher Educational Institutions of Ukraine of Non -State Ownership, International Personnel Academy, Transcarpathian Regional Council and Transcarpathian Regional State Administration. In 2018, he was awarded the title of Professor at the Higher School of Social and Economic Studies in Przeworsk, Poland.
