= Volodymyr Petin =

Ukrainian politician (born 1946)

- Володимир Петін
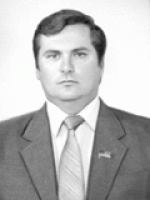

Member of the Verkhovna Rada
- In office 10 May 1990 – 10 May 1994

Personal details
- Born: Volodymyr Mykolayovych Petin; 6 April 1949 (age 77) Dnipropetrovsk, Soviet Union

Volodymyr Mykolayovych Petin (Ukrainian: Володимир Миколайович Петін; born on 6 April 1946) is a Ukrainian politician and activist who served as a member of a member of the Verkhovna Rada from 1990 to 1994.

He was the head of the head of the collective farm named after the 22nd Congress of the CPSU of Heniche district, Kherson region. He is a candidate of Agricultural Sciences.

== Biography ==
Volodymyr Petin was born in Dnipropetrovsk on 6 April 1949 to a peasant family, and is of Russian ethnicity.

From 1966 to 1971, he was a student of the Kherson Agricultural Institute, as an agronomist.

From 1971 to 1979, he was an agronomist of the collective farm "Georgia" of Heniche district, Kherson Oblast.

From 1979 to 1982, he was a graduate student at the Ukrainian Research Institute of Irrigation Agriculture in Kherson. In 1982 to 1983, he was a senior researcher at the Ukrainian Research Institute of Irrigation Agriculture in Kherson.

In 1983, he defended his PhD thesis "Irrigation regime and water consumption of seed alfalfa on the sandy lands of the Lower Dnipro".

In 1983 to 1987, he was the deputy head of the collective farm for fodder production, the chief agronomist of the collective farm "Georgia" of Heniche district, Kherson Oblast.

He joined the Communist Party of the Soviet Union in 1986, until its collapse in 1991.

In 1987, he was the 1st deputy head of Genichesky RAPO, head of the department for production and processing of plant products; head of the collective farm named after the XXII Congress of the Communist Party of the Soviet Union of Heniche District, Kherson Region.

On 4 March 1990, Petin was elected a member of parliament, People's Deputy of Ukraine of the Verkhovna Rada, 1st round 55.47% of votes, 2 candidates.

He took office on 15 May.

He left the parliament on 10 May 1994.

On 18 May 2017, he was charged in a criminal case by the European Court of Human Rights in Strasbourg.
