= Boris Dukhov =

Military officer (1937–2011)

- Борис Духов
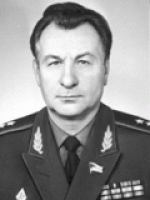

Member of the Verkhovna Rada
- In office 15 May 1990 – 13 December 1991

Personal details
- Born: Boris Innokentyevich Dukhov; 9 November 1937 Krasnoyarsk, Soviet Union
- Died: 28 July 2011 (aged 73) Moscow, Russia

Boris Innokentyevich Dukhov (Russian: Борис Иннокентьевич Духов; Ukrainian: Борис Інокентійович Духов; 9 November 1937 - 28 November 2011), was a politician and army officer who served as the Commander of the Air Defense Forces of the Ground Forces of the Armed Forces of the Russian Federation from 1991 to 2000.

Dukhov had also served as Member of the Verkhovna Rada before restoring his Russian citizenship, serving from 1990 to 1991.

He was last ranked a colonel general in 1988.

== Biography ==
Boris Dukhov was born in Krasnoyarsk on 9 November 1937 to a family of employees.

In 1945, he went to secondary school in Nizhneudinsk, Irkutsk Oblast.

Dukhov is of Russian ethnicity.

In 1955, he entered the Leningrad Anti-Aircraft Artillery Technical School. In 1958, he was transferred to the Kiev Higher Artillery Engineering School, where he graduated in 1959.

In April 1960, after graduation, he was appointed head of the radio engineering battery group in the Kiev Military District.

In March 1961, he was sent for further service to the Group of Soviet Forces in Germany with an appointment to the post of head of the first department - senior guidance officer for a radio engineering battery of a separate anti-aircraft missile regiment.

In December 1963, he was appointed commander of a radio engineering battery - deputy commander of an anti-aircraft missile division for the engineering and missile service of a separate anti-aircraft missile regiment (S-75) of the Group of Soviet Forces in Germany.

In November 1966, he was appointed commander of an anti-aircraft missile division of a separate anti-aircraft missile regiment (S-75) of the 1st Guards Tank Army of the Group of Soviet Forces in Germany.

In October 1968, he continued to serve as deputy commander of the anti-aircraft missile regiment "Cube" of the 4th Guards Tank Division of the Moscow Military District, and in October 1970 he was appointed to the post of commander of the same regiment with an early promotion to lieutenant colonel.

In November 1973, for his achievements in combat training, he was promoted to a colonel ahead of schedule.

In March 1974, he was appointed to the post of deputy chief of air defense troops of the Moscow Military District.

From September 1975 to June 1977 - student at the main faculty of the Military Academy of the General Staff of the USSR Armed Forces. After graduating from the Academy of the General Staff of the USSR Armed Forces in 1977, he was appointed head of the air defense forces of the North Caucasus Military District. In 1977, he was awarded the honorary title "Honored Military Specialist of the Russian Federation", and in October 1979, he was promoted to the Major General of Artillery.

From 1977 to July 1980, he was the chief of the Air Defense Forces of the North Caucasus Military District.

In July 1980, while serving in the Soviet-Afghan war, Dukhov was appointed commander of the air defense of the Turkestan Military District.

In 1983, he was promoted to lieutenant general.

In October 1984, he was the commander of the air defense forces of the South-Western direction.

In August 1986, Lieutenant General Dukhov was appointed head of the Military Academy of Air Defense of the Ground Forces named after A.M. Vasilevsky in Kyiv. In October 1988, he promoted to a Colonel General.

On 18 March 1990, Dukhov, as a Ukrainian citizen, was elected a member of parliament, a People's Deputy of Ukraine in the 2nd round, 50.61% of the votes, 22 applicants to the Verkhovna Rada. He took office in 15 May. He was the member of the Commission of the Verkhovna Rada on Defense and State Security.

On 13 December 1991, Dukhov submitted his deputy's mandate in connection with his appointment to the position of chief of air defense forces of the Ground Forces of the Ministry of Defense of the RSFSR and simultaneous departure from Ukraine.

By December 1991, Dukhov became the commander of the air defense forces of the Ground Forces of the Armed Forces of the Russian Federation, after his restoration of his Russian citizenship.

On 31 July 2000, Russian President Vladimir Putin fired Dukhov from the military post upon his retirement.

Dukhov died in Moscow on 28 July 2011 at the age of 73. He was buried at the Troyekurovsky cemetery.
