= Serhiy Kolisnyk =

Ukrainian artist (1965–2025)

Serhiy Petrovych Kolisnyk (Ukrainian: Сергій Петрович Колісник; 19 July 1965 – 27 August 2025) was a Ukrainian artist and musician.

== Life and work ==
Kolisnyk was born in 1965, in Barnaul, Gorno-Altai Autonomous Oblast, but was raised in Chernivtsi, graduating firstly from the Vyzhnytsia School of Applied Arts, before attending the Faculty of Art and Graphics of the Kryvyi Rih Pedagogical University. He was a Member of the Union of Artists of Ukraine, and had his art displayed at exhibitions in Antwerp (1995–1997), Hamburg (2007), and Chicago (2015).

Kolisnyk died 27 August 2025, at the age of 60.
