= Mykola Popov =

Ukrainian politician

- Микола Попов
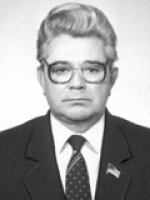
- Popov in 1990

People's Deputy of Ukraine
- In office 15 May 1990 – 10 May 1994
- Preceded by: Position established
- Succeeded by: Yurii Donchenko
- Constituency: Luhansk Oblast, Starobilsk

Personal details
- Born: 19 December 1937 Voroshilovgrad, Ukrainian SSR, Soviet Union
- Died: 1994 (aged 56–57)
- Party: Communist Party of Ukraine

Mykola Mykhailovych Popov (Ukrainian: Микола Михайлович Попов; 19 December 1937 – c. 1994) was a Ukrainian politician who was a People's Deputy of Ukraine from 1990 to 1994. He died after leaving the Verkhovna Rada around that year.

== Biography ==
Mykola Popov was born in Voroshilovgrad (present-day Luhansk) on 12 December 1937.

From 1955 to 1956, he was an apprentice, a fitter-turner at the tool shop of the Voroshilovgrad Locomotive Plant named after the October Revolution.

From 1956 to 1959, he served in the Soviet Navy.

He joined the Communist Party of the Soviet Union in 1958.

From 1959 to 1969, he was an electrician-tester, research engineer, head of the laboratory, head of the design group, head of the design bureau of the department of the chief designer for locomotive construction, head of the bureau of the Luhansk Locomotive Plant named after the October Revolution.

He graduated from Luhansk Mechanical Engineering Institute, mechanical engineer.

From 1969 to 1974, he was the second and first secretary of the October District Committee of the Communist Party of Luhansk.

In 1974 to 1976, he was the head of the industrial and transport department of the Voroshilovgrad Regional Committee of the Communist Party of Ukraine. From 1976 to October 1979, he was the head of the department of organizational and party work of the Voroshilovgrad Regional Committee of the Communist Party of Ukraine.

From October 1979 to April 1986, he was the First Secretary of the Voroshilovgrad City Committee of the Communist Party of Ukraine. He graduated in absentia from the Academy of Social Sciences under the Central Committee of the CPSU.

From 1986 to 1991, he was the second secretary of the Voroshilovgrad (Luhansk) Regional Committee of the Communist Party of Ukraine.

Popov was elected to the Verkhovna Rada from Starobilsk on 18 March 1990, during the second round of the 1990 Ukrainian Supreme Soviet election. He won 60.97% of the vote, placing the highest of three candidates. He was sworn into office on 15 May. He left the Verkhovna Rada on 10 May 1994.

Popov died around that year after leaving the parliament.
