= Ivan Makedonskyi =

Ukrainian politician (1942–2025)

- Іван Македонський

People's Deputy of Ukraine
- In office 15 May 1990 – 18 June 1992

Personal details
- Born: Ivan Ivanovych Makedonskyi; 17 June 1942 Bolgrad, Romania (today Bolhrad, Ukraine)
- Died: 4 December 2025 (aged 83)
- Party: CPSU (1967–1991)
- Education: Melitopol Institute of Agricultural Mechanization
- Occupation: Mechanical engineer

Ivan Ivanovych Makedonskyi (Ukrainian: Іван Іванович Македонський; 17 June 1942 – 4 December 2025) was a Ukrainian politician. A member of the Communist Party of the Soviet Union, he served in the Verkhovna Rada from 1990 to 1992.

Makedonskyi died on 4 December 2025, at the age of 83.
