= Vitalii Drobinskyi =

Ukrainian politician (1936–2025)

- Віталій Григорович Дробінський

People's Deputy of Ukraine
- In office 1990–1994
- Preceded by: Position established

Personal details
- Born: 26 February 1936 Kyiv Oblast, Ukrainian SSR, Soviet Union
- Died: 19 November 2025 (aged 89)
- Party: CPSU (1968-1991)
- Education: Ukrainian Agricultural Academy

Vitalii Hryhorovych Drobinskyi (Ukrainian: Віталій Григорович Дробінський; 26 January 1936 – 19 November 2025) was a Ukrainian politician. He served as a People's Deputy of Ukraine in the Verkhovna Rada, the parliament of Ukraine, during its first convocation from 1990 to 1994.

== Life and career ==
Drobinskyi was born in Kyiv Oblast on 26 January 1936. After graduating from the Ukrainian Agricultural Academy with a qualification as an electrical engineer, he became a member of the CPSU in 1968, a party he would stay in until the collapse of the Soviet Union in 1991. He then became the General Director of the production company "Megommeter", which was located in Uman. Ahead of the 1990 Ukrainian parliamentary election, the labor collective (the body of employees) of the Megommeter enterprise nominated him as a candidate to be a People's Deputy of Ukraine in the Verkhovna Rada, the parliament of Ukraine, for the Uman city constituency No. 420 of the Cherkasy region.

He won the election on 18 March 1990, garnering 52.76% of the vote in the second round of voting. During his time in parliament, he served on the committees for planning, budget, finances, and prices. After the end of his term in 1994, he did not run for reelection in the 1994 Ukrainian parliamentary election. After his four-year term, he returned to business, working in the instrument-making industry for which he received in 2008 the honorary title of citizen of Uman.

Drobinskyi died on 19 November 2025, at the age of 89. He was married and had two children.
